= List of Sahitya Akademi Translation Prize winners for Konkani =

List of winners of a literary honor in India

Part of a series on

Sahitya Akademi Awards
Category
Sahitya Akademi Award winners by language
- Assamese
- Bengali
- Bodo
- Dogri
- English
- Gujarati
- Hindi
- Kannada
- Kashmiri
- Konkani
- Maithili
- Malayalam
- Marathi
- Meitei (Manipuri)
- Nepali
- Odia
- Punjabi
- Rajasthani
- Sanskrit
- Santali
- Sindhi
- Tamil
- Telugu
- Urdu
Sahitya Akademi Translation Prizes
- Assamese
- Bengali
- Bodo
- Dogri
- English
- Gujarati
- Hindi
- Kannada
- Kashmiri
- Konkani
- Maithili
- Malayalam
- Marathi
- Meitei (Manipuri)
- Nepali
- Odia
- Punjabi
- Rajasthani
- Sanskrit
- Santali
- Sindhi
- Tamil
- Telugu
- Urdu
Sahitya Akademi Yuva Puraskar
- Assamese
- Bengali
- Bodo
- Dogri
- English
- Gujarati
- Hindi
- Kannada
- Kashmiri
- Konkani
- Maithili
- Malayalam
- Meitei (Manipuri)
- Marathi
- Nepali
- Odia
- Punjabi
- Rajasthani
- Sanskrit
- Santali
- Sindhi
- Tamil
- Telugu
- Urdu
Sahitya Akademi Bal Sahitya Puraskar
- Assamese
- Bengali
- Bodo
- Dogri
- English
- Gujarati
- Hindi
- Kannada
- Kashmiri
- Konkani
- Maithili
- Malayalam
- Meitei (Manipuri)
- Marathi
- Nepali
- Odia
- Punjabi
- Rajasthani
- Sanskrit
- Santali
- Sindhi
- Tamil
- Telugu
- Urdu
Related
- Eighth Schedule to the Constitution of India
- Official Languages Commission
- List of languages by number of native speakers in India

Sahitya Akademi Translation Prizes are given each year to writers for their outstanding translations work in the 24 languages, since 1989.

== Recipients ==
Following is the list of recipients of Sahitya Akademi translation prizes for their works written in Konkani. The award, as of 2019, consisted of ₹50,000.

Year	Translator	Title of the translation	Original Title	Original Language	Genre	Original Author	References
1990	Ravindra Kelekar	Ani Tankan Manshant Hadle	Mansaeena Diva	Gujarati	Novel	Jhaverchand Meghani	
1991	Raghunath Krishna Rao	Don Dangali Bhat	Randidangazhi	Malayalam	Novel	Thakazhi Sivasankara Pillai	
1993	Olivinho Gomes	Anandamath	Anandamath	Bengali	Novel	Bankim Chandra Chattopadhyay	
1994	Prakash G. Thali	Sanskar	Samskara	Kannada	Novel	U. R. Ananthamurthy	
1997	Yeshwant Palekar	Matyecho Mog	Marali Mannige	Kannada	Novel	K. Shivaram Karanth	
1998	Madhavi Sardesai	Eka Vicharachi Jivit-Katha	Mahatma Gandhi: Ek Jeevani	Hindi	Biography	Ravindra Kelekar	
1999	Suresh G. Amonkar	Dhammapad	Dhammapada	Pali	Buddhist Classic		
2000	H. Nagvenkar	Shejari	Ayalkar	Malayalam	Novel	P. Kesavadev	
2001	Chandrakant Keni	Sat Pawala Malbant	Saat Paglan Aakashman	Gujarati	Novel	Kundanika Kapadia	
2002	Gokuldas Prabhu	Chavki	Naalukettu	Malayalam	Novel	M. T. Vasudevan Nair	
2003	R. S. Bhaskar	Mhaja Aajak Eki Hasti Aashilli	Ntuppuppakkoranendarnnu	Malayalam	Novel	Vaikom Muhammad Basheer	
2004	Madhav Borkar	Ekshe Ek Kavita	Collection	Bengali	Poetry	Rabindranath Tagore	
2005	Ramesh Lad	Motveo Katha	Sanna Kathegalu	Kannada	Short Stories	Masti Venkatesha Iyengar	
2006	Nishat Ansari	Dr. Zakir Husain	Dr. Zakir Hussain	English	Biography	Mohammad Mujeeb	
2007	Sheela Kolambkar	Bhangrachem Suknnem	Collection	Dogri	Short stories		
2008	Narayana Purushothama Mallaya	Tirukkural	Tirukkural	Tamil	Poetry	Thiruvalluvar	
2009	Kasturi Desai	Adhikar Aranyacho	Aranyer Adhikar	Bengali	Novel	Mahasweta Devi	
2010	Alka Sinai Assoldekar	Sheem Hupatana	Daatu	Kannada	Novel	S. L. Bhyrappa	
2011	L. Sunitha Bai	Mahakavi Govinda Pai	Maha Kavi Govinda Pai	Kannada	Biography	Kayyar Kinhanna Rai	
2012	Gurunath Kelekar	Satyache Prayog Va Atmakatha	The Story of My Experiments with Truth	English	Autobiography	M. K. Gadnhi	
2013	Hema Naik	Kali-Katha: Via Bypass	Kali Katha: Via Bypass	Hindi	Novel	Alka Saraogi	
2014	Pandurang K. Gaude	Uchalya	Uchalya	Marathi	Biography	Laxman Gaikwad	
2015	Jaymala Danayat	Rag Darbari	Raag Darbaari	Hindi	Novel	Sri Lal Sukla	
2016	Meena Kakodkar	Savlyan Rego	The Shadow Lines	English	Novel	Amitav Ghosh	
2017	Prashanti Talpankar	Dirgh Moun Te	That Long Silence	Tamil	Novel	Shashi Deshpande	
2018	Narayan Bhaskar Desai	Rajwade Lekhsangraha	Rajwade Lekh Sangraha	Marathi	Essays	Vishwanath Kashinath Rajwade	
2019	Jayanti Naik	Zindaginama-Jeevo Rukh	Zindaginama	Hindi	Novel	Krishna Sobti	
2020	Jayashree Shanbhag	Swapna Saraswat	Swapna Saraswata	Kannada	Poetry	Gopalakrishna Pai	
2021	Geetha Shenoy	Bahujihwa Bharathik Ikyatachaya Aarathi	Vichara Krantige Ahvana	Kannada	Collection of Essays	K.V. Puttappa	
2022	Manikrao Ram Nayak Gaunekar	Sri Ramakrishna Amrutwani (Volume 1 & 2 in 3 parts each)	Sri Sri Ramakrishna Kathamrita	Bengali	Essays	Mahendranath Gupta	
2023	Sunetra Jog	Astavyasta Bayalo	Disorderly Women	English	Novel	Malathi Rao	
2024	Milind Mhamal	Bhartiya Tathvagineanachi Ruprekha	Outline of Indian Philosophy	English	Philosophy	M. Hiriyanna	

== See also ==
- List of Sahitya Akademi Award winners for Konkani
