= List of Sahitya Akademi Award winners for Kannada =

List of winners of a literary honor in India

Sahitya Akademi Award for Kannada
- Award for contributions to Kannada literature
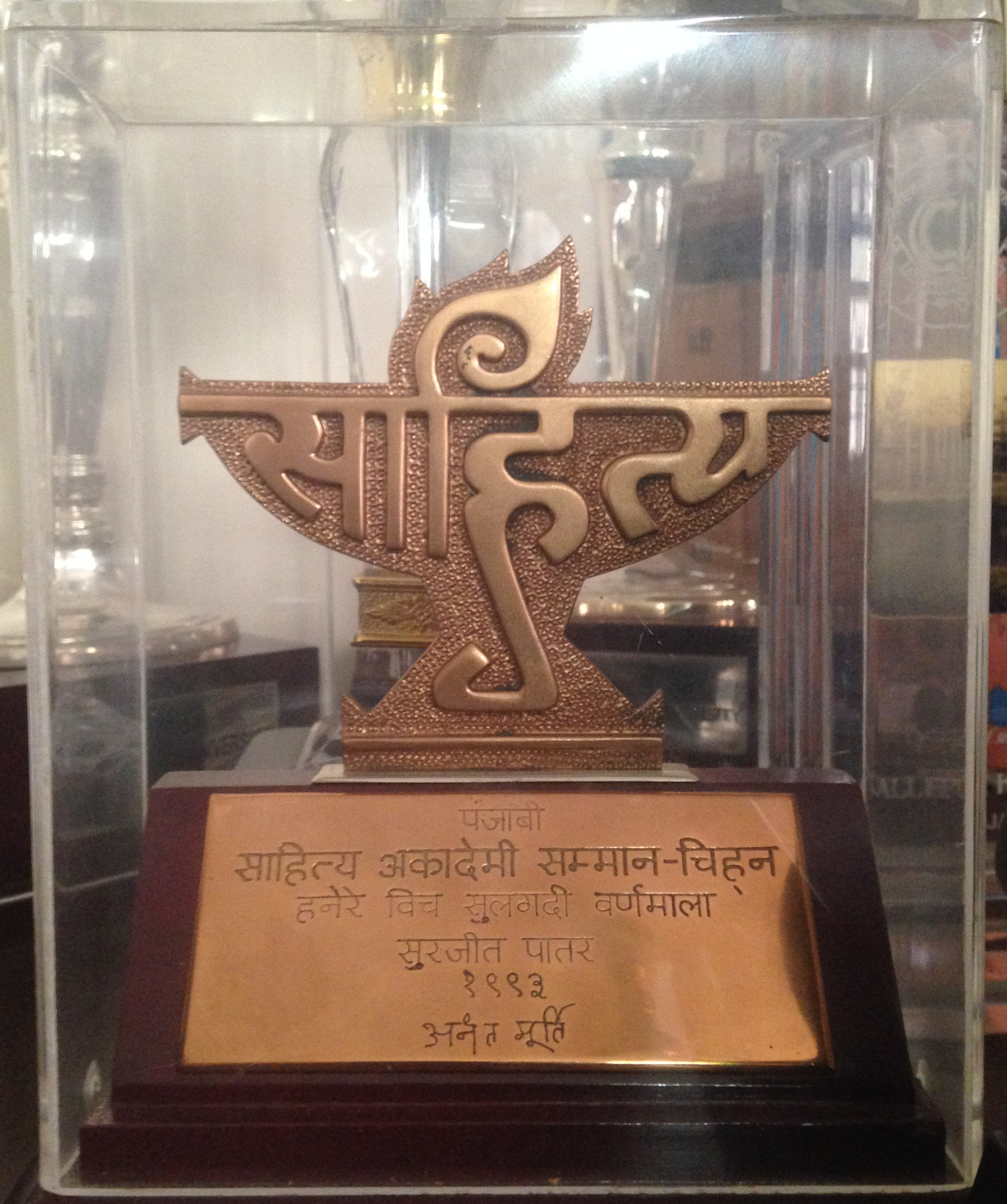
- Award
- Awarded for: Literary award in India
- Sponsored by: Sahitya Akademi, Government of India
- Reward: ₹1 lakh (US$1,100)
- First award: 1955
- Final award: 2024

Highlights
- Total awarded: 69
- First winner: Kuvempu
- Recent winner: K. V. Narayana
- Website: sahitya-akademi.gov.in

Part of a series on

Sahitya Akademi Awards
Category
Sahitya Akademi Award winners by language
- Assamese
- Bengali
- Bodo
- Dogri
- English
- Gujarati
- Hindi
- Kannada
- Kashmiri
- Konkani
- Maithili
- Malayalam
- Marathi
- Meitei (Manipuri)
- Nepali
- Odia
- Punjabi
- Rajasthani
- Sanskrit
- Santali
- Sindhi
- Tamil
- Telugu
- Urdu
Sahitya Akademi Translation Prizes
- Assamese
- Bengali
- Bodo
- Dogri
- English
- Gujarati
- Hindi
- Kannada
- Kashmiri
- Konkani
- Maithili
- Malayalam
- Marathi
- Meitei (Manipuri)
- Nepali
- Odia
- Punjabi
- Rajasthani
- Sanskrit
- Santali
- Sindhi
- Tamil
- Telugu
- Urdu
Sahitya Akademi Yuva Puraskar
- Assamese
- Bengali
- Bodo
- Dogri
- English
- Gujarati
- Hindi
- Kannada
- Kashmiri
- Konkani
- Maithili
- Malayalam
- Meitei (Manipuri)
- Marathi
- Nepali
- Odia
- Punjabi
- Rajasthani
- Sanskrit
- Santali
- Sindhi
- Tamil
- Telugu
- Urdu
Sahitya Akademi Bal Sahitya Puraskar
- Assamese
- Bengali
- Bodo
- Dogri
- English
- Gujarati
- Hindi
- Kannada
- Kashmiri
- Konkani
- Maithili
- Malayalam
- Meitei (Manipuri)
- Marathi
- Nepali
- Odia
- Punjabi
- Rajasthani
- Sanskrit
- Santali
- Sindhi
- Tamil
- Telugu
- Urdu
Related
- Eighth Schedule to the Constitution of India
- Official Languages Commission
- List of languages by number of native speakers in India

Sahitya Akademi Award is a literary honor given each year, since 1955, by Sahitya Akademi (India's National Academy of Letters), to writers and their works, for their outstanding contribution to the upliftment of Indian literature and Kannada literature in particular. The award was conferred in 1957 and 1963.

== Sahitya Akademi Award Recipients ==
=== Key ===
Symbol	Meaning
†	Indicates posthumous award

Year	Image	Recipients	Works	Genre	Ref(s)
1955		Kuvempu	Sri Ramayana Darshanam	Epic	
1956	–	R. S. Mugali	Kannada Sahitya Charitre	History of Literature	
1957	No award				
1958		D. R. Bendre	Aralu-Maralu	Poetry	
1959		K. Shivaram Karanth	Yakshagana Bayalata	A treatise on folk-drama	
1960		V. K. Gokak	Dyava-Prithivi	Poetry	
1961	–	A. R. Krishnashastry	Bengali Kadambarikara Bankim Chandra	Critical study	
1962 †	–	Devudu Narasimha Sastri	Mahakshatriya	Novel	
1963	No award				
1964	–	B. Puttaswamayya	Kranti-Kalyana	Novel	
1965	–	S. V. Ranganna	Ranga Binnapa	Philosophical reflections	
1966	–	P. T. Narasimhachar	Hamsa Damayanti Mattu Itara Rupakagalu	Musical plays	
1967		D. V. Gundappa	Shrimad Bhagavadgita Athava Jivanadharmayoga	Philosophical expositions	
1968		Masti Venkatesha Iyengar	Sannakathegalu (12-13)	Short stories	
1969		H. Tipperudraswamy	Karnataka Samskriti Sameekshe	Cultural Study	
1970	–	S. B. Joshi	Karnataka Samskritiya Poorva Peethike	Cultural Study	
1971	–	Adya Rangacharya	Kalidasa	Literary criticism	
1972	–	S. S. Bhoosnurmath	Shoonyasampadaneya Paramarshe	Commentary	
1973		V. Seetharamaiah	Aralu Baralu	Poetry	
1974	–	Gopalakrishna Adiga	Vardhamaana	Poetry	
1975		S. L. Bhyrappa	Daatu	Novel	
1976	–	M. Shivaram	Mana Manthana	Psychiatric studies	
1977		K. S. Narasimhaswamy	Tereda Baagilu	Poetry	
1978	–	B. G. L. Swamy	Hasuru Honnu	Travelogue	
1979	–	A. N. Murthy Rao	Chitragalu Patragalu	Reminiscences	
1980	–	Gorur Ramaswamy Iyengar	Americadalli Goruru	Travelogue	
1981		Chennaveera Kanavi	Jeewa Dhwani	Poetry	
1982	–	Chaduranga	Vaishakha	Novel	
1983		Yashwant Chittal	Katheyaadalu Hudugi	Short stories	
1984	–	G. S. Shivarudrappa	Kavyartha Chintana	Literary criticism	
1985 †	–	T. R. Subba Rao	Durgaastamana	Novel	
1986	–	Vyasaraya Ballal	Bandaya	Novel	
1987		K. P. Poornachandra Tejaswi	Chidambara Rahasya	Novel	
1988	–	Shankar Mokashi Punekar	Avadheshwari	Novel	
1989		H. M. Nayak	Samprati	Belles-Lettres	
1990		Devanur Mahadeva	Kusuma Baale	Novel	
1991		Chandrashekhara Kambara	Sirisampige	Play	
1992	–	S. R. Ekkundi	Bakulada Hoovugalu	Poetry	
1993	–	P. Lankesh	Kallu Karaguva Samaya	Short stories	
1994		Girish Karnad	Taledanda	Play	
1995	–	Kirtinath Kurtakoti	Uriya Nalage	Criticism	
1996	–	G. S. Amur	Bhuvanada Bhagya	Literary Criticism	
1997	–	M. Chidananda Murthy	Hosatu Hosatu	Criticism	
1998	–	B. C. Ramchandra Sharma	Sapthapadi	Poetry	
1999 †	–	D. R. Nagaraj	Sahitya Kathana	Essays	
2000 †		Shantinath Desai	Om Namo	Novel	
2001		L. S. Seshagiri Rao	English Sahitya Charitre	History of Literature	
2002	–	S. Narayana Setty	Yugasandhya	Epic	
2003	–	K. V. Subbanna	Kaviraja Marga Mattu Kannada Jagattu	Essays	
2004	–	Geetha Nagabhushan	Baduku	Novel	
2005	–	Raghavendra Patil	Teru	Novel	
2006	–	M. M. Kalburgi	Marga 4	Essays	
2007		Kum. Veerabhadrappa	Aramane	Novel	
2008		Shrinivas B. Vaidya	Halla Bantu Halla	Novel	
2009		Vaidehi	Krouncha Pakshigalu	Short Stories	
2010		Rahamat Tarikere	Katthiyanchina Daari	Literary Criticism	
2011	–	Gopalakrishna Pai	Swapna Saraswata	Novel	
2012		H. S. Shivaprakash	Mabbina Haage Kaniveyasi	Poetry	
2013		C. N. Ramachandran	Akhyana-Vyakhyana	Essays	
2014		Govindray H. Nayak	Uttaraardha	Essays	
2015		K. V. Tirumalesh	Akshaya Kavya	Poetry	
2016		Bolwar Mahammad Kunhi	Swatantryada Ota	Novel	
2017		T. P. Ashoka	Kathana Bharati	Literary criticism	
2018	–	K. G. Nagarajappa	Anushreni-Yajamanike	Literary criticism	
2019	–	Vijaya	Kudi Esaru	Autobiography	
2020		Veerappa Moily	Sri Bahubali Ahimsadigvijayam	Epic	
2021	–	D. S. Nagabhushana	Gandhi Kathana	Biography	
2022		Mudnakudu Chinnaswamy	Bahutvada Bhaarata mattu Bouddha Taatvikate	Collection of Articles	
2023		Lakshmisha Tolpadi	Mahabharatha Anusandhanada Bharathayatre	Essays	
2024		K. V. Narayana	Nudigala Alivu	Literary Criticism	
2025	–	Amaresha Nugadoni	Dada Serisu Thande	Short stories	

== Bhasha Samman awardees ==
Year	Image	Recipient(s)	Work(s)	Genre	Ref(s)
1996	–	Mandara Keshava Bhat & Jattappa Rai	Total Contribution to Tulu Literature (Jointly received)		
2001		T. V. Venkatachala Sastry	Classical and Medieval Literature	–	
2005		L. Basavaraju	Classical and Medieval Literature	–	
2006		Hampa Nagarajaiah	Classical and Medieval Literature	–	
2007		S. Shettar	Classical and Medieval Literature & Kannada Literature	–	
2010		Addanda Cariappa & Mandira Java Appanna	Kodava (Jointly received)	–	

== Akademi Translation Prize winners ==
Year	Image	Recipient(s)	Translated Work(s)	Genre	Ref(s)
1990	–	S. V. Parameshwara Bhat	Kannada Kalidasa Mahasamputa	Poetry & drama	
1991	–	H. S. Venkateshamurthy	Rithu Vilasa	Poetry	
1992	–	Saraswati Gajanan Risbud	Valmiki Ramayana Shapa Mattu Vara	Epic	
1993	–	Kirthinath Kurtakoti	Marathi Samkriti: Kelavu Samasyegalu	Criticism	
1994	–	Pradhan Gurudatta	Jaya Yaudheya	Novel	
1995	–	Thippeswamy	Nirmala	Novel	
1996	–	Shesha Narayana	Hadinentaneya Aksharekhe	Novel	
1997	–	Neerpaje Bheema Bhatta	Kalhanana Rajatarangini Vol I & II	Poetry	
1998	–	C. Raghavan	Indulekha	Novel	
1999	–	Vamana D. Bendre	Kosala	Novel	
2000	–	L. Basavaraju	Buddha Charite	Epic	
2001		Bannanje Govindacharya	Aveya Mannina Atada Bandi	Play	
2002		Veena Shanteshwara	Nadi Dweepagalu	Novel	
2003		Snehalata Rohidkar	Vichitra Varna	-	
2004		Chandrakant M. Pokale	Mahanayaka	Novel	
2005		Panchakshari Hiremath	Hemantha Ruthuvina Swaragalu	Short stories	
2006		R. S. Lokapura	Kannada Jnaneshwari	Poetry	
2007		R. Lakshminarayana	Kannada Vakrokti	Poetics	
2008		Hasan Nayeem Surakoda	Raseethi Tikeetu	Autobiography	
2009		D. N. Srinath	Bheeshma Sahaniyavara Prathinidhika Kathegalu	Short stories	
2010		A. Janaki	Godana	Novel	
2011		Tamil Selvi	Nanu Avanalla...Avalu...!	Autobiography	
2012		K. K. Nair & Ashok Kumar	Hagga (Part 1, 2, 3)	Novel	
2013		J. P. Doddamani	Mahatma Jyotirao Phule	Biography	
2014		G. N. Ranganatha Rao	Mohan Das: Ondu Sathya Kathe	Biography	
2015		N. Damodara Shetty	Kochereti	Novel	
2016		O. L. Nagabhushanaswamy	A. K. Ramanujan: Ayda Kathegalu	Essays	
2017		H. S. Srimathi	Mahashewtadevi Avara Katha Sahitya-1 & 2	Short stories	
2018		Giraddi Govindaraj	Jaya: Mahabharatha Sachitra Marukatha	Epic	
2019		Vittalrao T. Gaikwad	Dalita Sahityada Soundarya Prajne	Literary Criticism	

== Yuva Puraskara winners ==
Year	Image	Recipient(s)	Work(s)	Genre	Ref(s)
2011	–	Veeranna Madiwalara	Nelada Karuneya Dani	Poetry	
2012	–	Arif Raja	Jangama Fakeerana Jolige	Poetry	
2013	–	Lakkur Ananda	Batavaadeyagada Raseethi	Poetry	
2014	–	Kavya Kadame	Dhyanakke Thareekhina Hangilla	Poetry	
2015	–	Mounesh Badiger	Mayakolahala	Short stories	
2016	–	Vikrama Hatwara	Zero Mattu Ondu	Short stories	
2017	–	Shanti K. Appanna	Manasu Abhisaarike	Short stories	
2018	–	Padmanabha Bhat	Kepina Dabbi	Short stories	
2019	–	Fakeer (Shridhar Banvasi G. C.)	Beru	Novel	
2020		K. S. Mahadevaswamy (Swamy Ponnachi)	Dhoopada Makkalu	Short	
2021	–	Basu Bevinagida	Odi Hoda Huduga	Short	
2024		Shruthi B R	Zero Balance	Poetry	

== Bala Sahitya Puraskara winners ==
Year	Image	Recipient(s)	Work(s)	Genre	Ref(s)
2010		Bolwar Mahammad Kunhi	Paapu Gandhi: Gandhi Baapu Aada Kathe	Novellette	
2011		Na D'Souza	Mulugade Oorige Bandavaru	Novellette	
2012	–	Palakala Seetharam Bhat	Total Contribution to Children's Literature	-	
2013		H. S. Venkateshamurthy	Total Contribution to Children's Literature	-	
2014		Anand V. Patil	Total Contribution to Children's Literature	-	
2015		T. S. Nagaraja Shetty	Total Contribution to Children's Literature	-	
2016		Sumatheendra R. Nadig	Total Contribution to Children's Literature	-	
2017		N. S. Lakshminarayan Bhat	Total Contribution to Children's Literature	-	
2018		Kanchyani Sharanappa Shivasangappa	Total Contribution to Children's Literature	-	
2019		Chandrakant Karadalli	Kadu Kanasina Beedige	Novel	
2020		H. S. Byakoda	Nanoo Ambedkar	Novel	
2021		L. Lakshmi Narayana Swamy	thogala cheelada karna(ತೊಗಲ ಚೀಲದ ಕರ್ಣ)	Poetry	
2024		Krishnamurthy Biligere	ಛೂಮಂತ್ರಯ್ಯನ ಕಥೆಗಳು (Choomantrayyana Kathegalu )	Short Stories	
