= Amonkar =

Amonkar is a surname. Notable people with the surname include:

- Guru Amonkar, Indian cricketer
- Kishori Amonkar (1932–2017), Indian classical vocalist
- Ravindra Amonkar (born 1950), Indian director
- Sumiran Amonkar (born 1991), Indian cricketer
- Suresh Amonkar (1952–2020), Indian politician
- Suresh Gundu Amonkar (1935–2019), Indian educationist
