= Jayashree Shanbhag =

Indian writer

Jayashree Shanbhag is an Indian writer. She won the 2020 Sahitya Akademi Translation Prize in Konkani language for Swapna Saraswat, her translation of the Kannada novel Swapna Saraswata by Gopalakrishna Pai.
