= List of Sahitya Akademi Translation Prize winners for Maithili =

List of winners of a literary honor in India

Part of a series on

Sahitya Akademi Awards
Category
Sahitya Akademi Award winners by language
- Assamese
- Bengali
- Bodo
- Dogri
- English
- Gujarati
- Hindi
- Kannada
- Kashmiri
- Konkani
- Maithili
- Malayalam
- Marathi
- Meitei (Manipuri)
- Nepali
- Odia
- Punjabi
- Rajasthani
- Sanskrit
- Santali
- Sindhi
- Tamil
- Telugu
- Urdu
Sahitya Akademi Translation Prizes
- Assamese
- Bengali
- Bodo
- Dogri
- English
- Gujarati
- Hindi
- Kannada
- Kashmiri
- Konkani
- Maithili
- Malayalam
- Marathi
- Meitei (Manipuri)
- Nepali
- Odia
- Punjabi
- Rajasthani
- Sanskrit
- Santali
- Sindhi
- Tamil
- Telugu
- Urdu
Sahitya Akademi Yuva Puraskar
- Assamese
- Bengali
- Bodo
- Dogri
- English
- Gujarati
- Hindi
- Kannada
- Kashmiri
- Konkani
- Maithili
- Malayalam
- Meitei (Manipuri)
- Marathi
- Nepali
- Odia
- Punjabi
- Rajasthani
- Sanskrit
- Santali
- Sindhi
- Tamil
- Telugu
- Urdu
Sahitya Akademi Bal Sahitya Puraskar
- Assamese
- Bengali
- Bodo
- Dogri
- English
- Gujarati
- Hindi
- Kannada
- Kashmiri
- Konkani
- Maithili
- Malayalam
- Meitei (Manipuri)
- Marathi
- Nepali
- Odia
- Punjabi
- Rajasthani
- Sanskrit
- Santali
- Sindhi
- Tamil
- Telugu
- Urdu
Related
- Eighth Schedule to the Constitution of India
- Official Languages Commission
- List of languages by number of native speakers in India

Sahitya Akademi Translation Prizes are given each year to writers for their outstanding translations work in the 24 languages, since 1989.

== Recipients ==
Following is the list of recipients of Sahitya Akademi translation prizes for their works written in Maithili. The award, as of 2019, consisted of ₹50,000.

| Year | Translator | Title of the translation | Original Title | Original Language | Genre | Original Author | References |
|---|---|---|---|---|---|---|---|
| 1990 | Upendranath Jha 'Vyas' | Vipradas | Vipradas | Bengali | Novel | Sarat Chandra Chattopadhyay | |
| 1991 | Shailendra Mohan Jha | Saratchandra: Vyakti Evam Kalakar | Saratchandra: Man and Artist | English | Criticism | Subodh Chandra Sengupta | |
| 1993 | Govind Jha | Nepali Sahityak Itihas | History of Nepali Literature | English | Essays | Kumar Pradhan | |
| 1994 | Ramdeo Jha | Sagai | Ek Chader Maili Si | Urdu | Novel | Rajinder Singh Bedi | |
| 1995 | Surendra Jha 'Suman' | Rabindra Natakavali Vol. I | Chirakumar Sabha, Visarjan and Chitrangada | Bengali | Plays | Rabindranath Tagore | |
| 1996 | Fazlur Rahman Hashmi | Abul Kalam Azad | Abul Kalam Azad | Urdu | Autobiography | Abul Kalam Azad | |
| 1997 | Navin Choudhary | Matimangal | Marali Mannige | Kannada | Novel | K. Shivaram Karanth | |
| 1998 | Chandnath Mishra 'Amar' | Parashuramak Beechal-Bereyal Katha | Selection | Bengali | Short stories | Rajshekhar Basu | |
| 1999 | Murari Madhusudan Thakur | Arogya Niketan | Arogya Niketan | Bengali | Novel | Tarasankar Bandyopadhyay | |
| 2000 | Amaresh Pathak | Tamas | Tamas | Hindi | Novel | Bhisham Sahni | |
| 2001 | Sureshwar Jha | Anatariksha Me Visphot | Antaralatil Sphot | Marathi | Novel | Jayant Narlikar | |
| 2002 | Prabodh Narayan Singh | Patjharak Swar | Patjhar Ki Awaz | Urdu | Short stories | Qurratulain Hyder | |
| 2003 | Upendra Doshi | Manoj Dasak Katha O Kahini | Manoj Dasank Katha O Kahini | Odia | Short stories | Manoj Das | |
| 2004 | Prafulla Kumar Singh 'Maun' | Premchand: Chayanit Katha-I | Collection | Hindi | Short stories | Premchand | |
| 2005 | Yogananda Jha | Motveo Katha | Folk Tales of Bihar | English | Folk tales | P.C. Roy Choudhary | |
| 2006 | Rajanada Jha | Kalbela | Kalbela | Bengali | Novel | Samaresh Majumdar | |
| 2007 | Ananta Bihar Lal Das Indu | Yuddha Aur Yoddha | Yudha Ra Yoddha | Nepali | Poetry | Agam Singh Giri | |
| 2008 | Tara Kanta Jha | Samrachnavad, Uttar Samrachnavad Evam Tara Kanta Jha Prachya Kavyashastra | Sakhtiyat, Pas-Sakhtiyat Aur Mashriqi Sheriyat | Urdu | Criticism | Gopi Chand Narang | |
| 2009 | Bhalchandra Jha | Beechhal Berayal Marathi Ekanki | Nivdak Marathi Ekankika | Marathi | Plays | Various Authors | |
| 2010 | Nityanand Lal Das | Prajwalit Pragya | Ignited Minds | English | Essays | A. P. J. Abdul Kalam | |
| 2011 | Khushi Lai Jha | Uparvas Kathatrayee | Uparvas Kathatrayee | Gujarati | Novel | Raghuveer Chaudhari | |
| 2012 | Mahendra Narayan Ram | Kermelin | Karmelin | Konkani | Novel | Damodar Mauzo | |
| 2013 | Guna Nath Jha | Bangla Ekanki Natya Sangraha | Bangla Ekanki Natya Sangraha | Bengali | Collection of One Act Plays | Various Authors | |
| 2014 | Ram Narayan Singh | Malahin | Chemmeen | Malayalam | Novel | Thakazhi Sivasankara Pillai | |
| 2015 | Devendra Jha | Badali Jaichh Ghareta | Bari Badle Jai | Bengali | Novel | Ramapada Choudhuri | |
| 2016 | Rewati Mishra | Mithilak Lok Sahityak Bhumika | Introduction To The Folk Literature Of Mithila | English | Criticism | Jayakant Mishra | |
| 2017 | Indra Kant Jha | Aangliyat | Aangliyat | Gujarati | Novel | Joseph Macwan | |
| 2018 | Sadare Alam 'Gauhar' | Herael Jakan Kichhu | Khoya Huwa Sa Kuchh | Urdu | Poetry | Nida Fazli | |
| 2019 | Kedar Kanan | Akaal Me Saaras | Akaal Mein Saaras | Hindi | Collection of Poetry | Kedarnath Singh | |
| 2020 | Jitendra Narayan Jha | Chaupadi | Chatushpathi | Bengali | Novel | Swapanmay Chakraborthy | |
| 2021 | Ms. Shikha Goyal | Smarangatha | Smarangatha | Marathi | Autobiographical Novel | G.N. Dandekar | |
| 2022 | Ratneshwar Mishra | Azaadi | Azadi | English | Novel | Chaman Nahal | |
| 2023 | Menaka Mallik | Nilkantha | Nilkantha | Nepali | Novel | Matsyendra Pradhan | |
| 2024 | Keshkar Thakur | Aaranyak | Aaranyak | Bengali | Novel | Bibhutibhushan Bandyopadhyay | |

== See also ==
- List of Sahitya Akademi Award winners for Maithili
