= List of Sahitya Akademi Translation Prize winners for Hindi =

List of winners of a literary honor in India

Part of a series on

Sahitya Akademi Awards
Category
Sahitya Akademi Award winners by language
- Assamese
- Bengali
- Bodo
- Dogri
- English
- Gujarati
- Hindi
- Kannada
- Kashmiri
- Konkani
- Maithili
- Malayalam
- Marathi
- Meitei (Manipuri)
- Nepali
- Odia
- Punjabi
- Rajasthani
- Sanskrit
- Santali
- Sindhi
- Tamil
- Telugu
- Urdu
Sahitya Akademi Translation Prizes
- Assamese
- Bengali
- Bodo
- Dogri
- English
- Gujarati
- Hindi
- Kannada
- Kashmiri
- Konkani
- Maithili
- Malayalam
- Marathi
- Meitei (Manipuri)
- Nepali
- Odia
- Punjabi
- Rajasthani
- Sanskrit
- Santali
- Sindhi
- Tamil
- Telugu
- Urdu
Sahitya Akademi Yuva Puraskar
- Assamese
- Bengali
- Bodo
- Dogri
- English
- Gujarati
- Hindi
- Kannada
- Kashmiri
- Konkani
- Maithili
- Malayalam
- Meitei (Manipuri)
- Marathi
- Nepali
- Odia
- Punjabi
- Rajasthani
- Sanskrit
- Santali
- Sindhi
- Tamil
- Telugu
- Urdu
Sahitya Akademi Bal Sahitya Puraskar
- Assamese
- Bengali
- Bodo
- Dogri
- English
- Gujarati
- Hindi
- Kannada
- Kashmiri
- Konkani
- Maithili
- Malayalam
- Meitei (Manipuri)
- Marathi
- Nepali
- Odia
- Punjabi
- Rajasthani
- Sanskrit
- Santali
- Sindhi
- Tamil
- Telugu
- Urdu
Related
- Eighth Schedule to the Constitution of India
- Official Languages Commission
- List of languages by number of native speakers in India

Sahitya Akademi Translation Prizes are given each year (since 1989) to writers for their outstanding translations work in the 24 languages.

== Recipients ==
Following is the list of recipients of Sahitya Akademi translation prizes for their works written in Hindi. The award, as of 2019, consisted of ₹50,000.

Year	Translator	Title of the translation	Original Title	Original Language	Genre	Original Author	References
1989	Noor Nabi Abbasi	Malabar Se Masko Tak	Many Worlds	English	Autobiography	K.P.S. Menon	
1990	Moreshwar Tapaswi	Yayati	Yayati	Marathi	Novel	V.S.Khandekar	
1991	Bhimasen Nirmal	Viswambhara	Viswambhara	Telugu	Epic	C. Narayana Reddy	
1992	Kanti Deb	Mrityunjay	Mrityunjay	Kannada	Novel	Niranjana	
1993	Nandini D. Mehta	Deevaron Se Paar Aakash	Sat Paglan Aakashman	Gujarati	Novel	Kundanika Kapadia	
1994	B.R. Narayan	Kshitij	Kshitij	Kannada	Novel	Shantinath Desai	
1995	Sudhanshu Chaturvedi	Rassi	Kayar	Malayalam	Novel	Thakazhi Sivasankara Pillai	
1996	N.E. Vishwanatha lyer	Dawa	Marunnu	Malayalam	Novel	Punathil Kunjabdulla	
1997	J.L. Reddy	Mitti Ka Admi	Matti Manishi	Telugu	Novel	Vasireddy Sitadevi	
1998	Rajendra Prasad Mishra	Varsha Ki Subah	Varsha Sakal	Oriya	Poetry	Sitakant Mahapatra	
1999	Prayag Shukla	Bankimchandra Pratinidhi Nibandh	Collection of Essays by Bankim Chandra	Bengali	Essays	Bankim Chandra Chattopadhyay	
2000	Rati Saxena	Ayyappa Paniker Ki Kavitayen	Ayyappa Panikarude Kritikal	Malayalam	Poetry	K. Ayyappa Paniker	
2001	Chaman Lal	Samaya O Bhai Samaya	Collection	Punjabi	Poetry	Pash	
2002	Krishnamohan	Kaamyogi	The Ascetic of Desire	English	Novel	Sudhir Kakar	
2003	Devesh	Samrachnavad, Uttar-Samrachnavad Evam Prachya Kavyashastra	Sakhtiyat, Pas-Sakhtiyat Aur Mashriqi Sheriyat	Urdu	Literary Criticism	Gopi Chand Narang	
2004	Ramshankar Dwivedi	Jhansi Ki Rani	Jhansir Rani	Bengali	Novel	Mahasveta Devi	
2005	Nirmala Jain	Sach, Pyar Aur Thodi Si Shararat	Truth, Love and Little Malice	English	Autobiography	Khushwant Singh	
2006	Y. Balashowri Reddy	Kalatit Vyakti	Kalatit Vyaktulu	Telugu	Novel	Sridevi	
2007	Bachchan Singh	Mahabharat Ki Katha	Mahabharater Katha	Bengali	Novel	Buddhadeva Bose	
2008	Nilabh	Mamooli Cheezon Ka Devata	The God of Small Things	English	Novel	Arundhati Roy	
2009	Bhalchandra Jaishetty	Kavyartha Chintan	Kavyartha Chintan	Kannada	Poetry	G. S. Shivarudrappa	
2010	Shankar Lal Purohit	Parja	Parja	Oriya	Novel	Gopinath Mohanty	
2011	S. Shesharattanam	Gift Packet	Vedukutu, Ventadutu, Vetadutu	Telugu	Novel	Jayanti Paparao	
2012	Ramji Tiwari	Sambhaji	Sambhaji	Marathi	Novel	Vishwas Patil	
2013	Bhuddhadev Chatterjee	Ahiran	Ahiran	Assamese	Novel	Indira Goswami	
2014	Phoolchand Manav	Annadata	Annadata	Punjabi	Novel	Baldev Singh	
2015	Damodar Khadse	Baromas	Baromas	Marathi	Novel	Sadanand Deshmukh	
2016	P. Jayaraman	Sant Vani	Sant Vani - Nalayira Divya Prabandham	Tamil	Poetry	Alwar Saint	
2017	Pratibha Agrawal	Abhinay Natak Manch	Abhinay Natak Manch	Bengali	Rangmunch	Sombhu Mitra	
2018	Prabhat Tripathi	Vansha (Mahabharat Kavita)	Vansh	Odia	Poetry	Haraprasad Das	
2019	Alok Gupta	Saraswatichandra, (Part I & II)	Saraswatichandra	Gujarati	Novel	Govardhanram Madhavaram Tripathi	
2020	T. E. S. Raghwan	Thirukkural	Thirukkural	Tamil	Poetry	Thiruvalluvar	
2021	Dharanendra Kurkuri	Jwalamukhi Par	Jwalamukhiya Mele	Kannada	Novel	Basavaraj Kattimani	
2022	Gauri Shankar Raina	Kashmiri Ki Pratinidhi Kahaniyan	Short Stories Kashmiri	Kashmiri	Short Stories	Various authors	
2023	Rita Rani Paliwal	Pashu, Panchhi, Manushya Aur Prakriti : Mahabharat Se Kathayen	Birds, Beasts, Man and Nature: Tales from Mahabharata	English	Short Stories	Kavita A. Sharma	

== See also ==
- List of Sahitya Akademi Award winners for Hindi
