= List of Sahitya Akademi Translation Prize winners for Assamese =

List of winners of a literary honor in India

Part of a series on

Sahitya Akademi Awards
Category
Sahitya Akademi Award winners by language
- Assamese
- Bengali
- Bodo
- Dogri
- English
- Gujarati
- Hindi
- Kannada
- Kashmiri
- Konkani
- Maithili
- Malayalam
- Marathi
- Meitei (Manipuri)
- Nepali
- Odia
- Punjabi
- Rajasthani
- Sanskrit
- Santali
- Sindhi
- Tamil
- Telugu
- Urdu
Sahitya Akademi Translation Prizes
- Assamese
- Bengali
- Bodo
- Dogri
- English
- Gujarati
- Hindi
- Kannada
- Kashmiri
- Konkani
- Maithili
- Malayalam
- Marathi
- Meitei (Manipuri)
- Nepali
- Odia
- Punjabi
- Rajasthani
- Sanskrit
- Santali
- Sindhi
- Tamil
- Telugu
- Urdu
Sahitya Akademi Yuva Puraskar
- Assamese
- Bengali
- Bodo
- Dogri
- English
- Gujarati
- Hindi
- Kannada
- Kashmiri
- Konkani
- Maithili
- Malayalam
- Meitei (Manipuri)
- Marathi
- Nepali
- Odia
- Punjabi
- Rajasthani
- Sanskrit
- Santali
- Sindhi
- Tamil
- Telugu
- Urdu
Sahitya Akademi Bal Sahitya Puraskar
- Assamese
- Bengali
- Bodo
- Dogri
- English
- Gujarati
- Hindi
- Kannada
- Kashmiri
- Konkani
- Maithili
- Malayalam
- Meitei (Manipuri)
- Marathi
- Nepali
- Odia
- Punjabi
- Rajasthani
- Sanskrit
- Santali
- Sindhi
- Tamil
- Telugu
- Urdu
Related
- Eighth Schedule to the Constitution of India
- Official Languages Commission
- List of languages by number of native speakers in India

Sahitya Akademi Translation Prizes are given each year to writers for their outstanding translations work in the 24 languages, since 1989.

== Recipients ==
Following is the list of recipients of Sahitya Akademi translation prizes for their works written in Assamese. The award, as of 2019, consisted of ₹50,000.

Year	Translator	Title of the translation	Original Title	Original Language	Genre	Original Author	Ref.
1990	Narendranath Sarma	Atmajivan Charit	Autobiography	English	Autobiography	Jawaharlal Nehru	
1991	Radhika Mohan Bhagowati	Amar Batori Kakator Kahini	The Story of Our Newspaper	English		Chanchal Sarkar	
1992	Bimal Bhagavati	Yayati	Yayati	Marathi	Novel	V.S. Khandekar	
1993	Phani Talukdar	Aghari Awatar	Awara Masiha	Hindi	Novel	Vishnu Prabhakar	
1994	Basundhara Saikia	Datta	Datta	Bengali	Novel	Saratchandra Chattopadhyay	
1995	Kulanath Gogoi	Aranyer Adhikar	Aranyer Adhikar	Bengali	Novel	Mahasweta Devi	
1996	Tilak Hazarika	Phanishwarnath Renur Shreshtha Kahini	Phanishwarnath Renu Ki Shreshtha Kahaniyan	Hindi	Novel	Phanishwarnath Renu	
1997	Kirtinath Hazarika	Gandhi: Jivan Katha	Gandhi: A Life	English	Biography	Krishna Kripalani	
1998	Gaurishankar Bhattacharya	Swadhinatar Raj-Bichar	Trials of Independence	English	Essays	B.R. Aggarwalla	
1999	Nirupama Phukan	Godan	Godan	Hindi	Novel	Munshi Premchand	
2000	Tirtha Phukan	Tamas	Tamas	Hindi	Novel	Bhisham Sahni	
2001	Suchibrata Raychoudhury	Vaishnav Dharmar Atiguri Aru Bikash	Origin and Development of Vaishnavism	English		S. Jaiswal	
2002	Prabhat Chandra Sarma	Kadambari	Kadambari	Sanskrit		Bāṇabhaṭṭa	
2003	Rajen Saikia	Putala Nachar Itikatha	Putul Nacher Itikatha	Bengali	Novel	Manik Bandopadhyay	
2004	Preeti Barua	Rathachakra	Rathachakra	Marathi	Novel	Shripad Narayan Pendse	
2005	Prafulla Kotoky	Untouchables	Untouchable	English	Novel	Bonomali Goswami	
2006	Hemeswar Dihingia	Avamanitar Atmakatha	Kissa Gulam	Hindi	Novel	Ramesh Ch. Shah	
2007	Malaya Khaund	Dadibudha	Dadibudha	Oriya	Novel	Gopinath Mohanty	
2008	Malinee Goswami	Harsacarita	Harshacharita	Sanskrit	Biography	Bāṇabhaṭṭa	
2009	Jatindra Kumar Bargohain	Lokayat Darshan	Lokayata Darshan	Bengali	Criticism	Debiprasad Chattopadhyaya	
2010	Anupama Dutta Saikia	Opaja Matir Hat Bauli	Marali Mannige	Kannada	Novel	K. Shivaram Karanth	
2011	Suresh Sharma	Adamya Shakti	Indomitable Spirit	English	Essays	A. P. J. Abdul Kalam	
2012	Pankaj Thakur	Bidirna Baghjai	Zadazadati	Marathi	Novel	Vishwas Patil	
2013	Dipika Chakraborty	Sei Samay (Vol-II)	Sei Samay	Bengali	Novel	Sunil Gangopadhyay	
2014	Bipul Deori	The Immortals of Meluha	The Immortals of Meluha	English	Novel	Amish Tripathi	
2015	Suren Talukdar	Ganadevata	Ganadevata	Bengali	Novel	Tarasankar Bandyopadhyay	
2016	Tapeswar Sarmah	Upanisada - Padyanubad	Upanishads	Sanskrit	Poetry	Various Authors	
2017	Babul Tamuly	Eti Koli Duti Pat	Two Leaves and a Bud	English	Novel	Mulk Raj Anand	
2018	Partha Pratim Hazarika	Ramayan: Gangar Pora Brahmaputraloi	Ramayan: From Ganga To Brahmaputra	English	Essays - Monograph	Indira Goswami	
2019	Nava Kumar Handique	Rajtarangini	Rajtarangini	Sanskrit	Historical Chronicle	Kalhana	
2020	Diganta Biswa Sharma	Bharatiya Sanskritir Bhiti	The Renaissance in India and other Esaays on Indian Culture	English	Essay	Sri Aurobindo	
2021	Pori Hiloidari	Danti Paror Manuh	The Legends of Pensam	English	Essay	Mamang Dai	
2022	Jury Dutta	Kocharethi: Araya Nari	Kocharethi	Malayalam	Novel	Narayan	
2023	Lakkshajyoti Gogoi Handique	Mor Jivnto	Once Upon a Life: Burnt Curry and Bloody Rags	English	Memoir	Temsüla Ao	
2024	Anjan Sarma	Prachin Kamrupar Itihas	Early History of Kamarupa	English	Novel	Kanaklal Barua	

== See also ==
- List of Sahitya Akademi Award winners for Assamese
