= List of Bal Sahitya Puraskar winners for Konkani =

Winners of a literary honour in India

Part of a series on

Sahitya Akademi Awards
Category
Sahitya Akademi Award winners by language
- Assamese
- Bengali
- Bodo
- Dogri
- English
- Gujarati
- Hindi
- Kannada
- Kashmiri
- Konkani
- Maithili
- Malayalam
- Marathi
- Meitei (Manipuri)
- Nepali
- Odia
- Punjabi
- Rajasthani
- Sanskrit
- Santali
- Sindhi
- Tamil
- Telugu
- Urdu
Sahitya Akademi Translation Prizes
- Assamese
- Bengali
- Bodo
- Dogri
- English
- Gujarati
- Hindi
- Kannada
- Kashmiri
- Konkani
- Maithili
- Malayalam
- Marathi
- Meitei (Manipuri)
- Nepali
- Odia
- Punjabi
- Rajasthani
- Sanskrit
- Santali
- Sindhi
- Tamil
- Telugu
- Urdu
Sahitya Akademi Yuva Puraskar
- Assamese
- Bengali
- Bodo
- Dogri
- English
- Gujarati
- Hindi
- Kannada
- Kashmiri
- Konkani
- Maithili
- Malayalam
- Meitei (Manipuri)
- Marathi
- Nepali
- Odia
- Punjabi
- Rajasthani
- Sanskrit
- Santali
- Sindhi
- Tamil
- Telugu
- Urdu
Sahitya Akademi Bal Sahitya Puraskar
- Assamese
- Bengali
- Bodo
- Dogri
- English
- Gujarati
- Hindi
- Kannada
- Kashmiri
- Konkani
- Maithili
- Malayalam
- Meitei (Manipuri)
- Marathi
- Nepali
- Odia
- Punjabi
- Rajasthani
- Sanskrit
- Santali
- Sindhi
- Tamil
- Telugu
- Urdu
Related
- Eighth Schedule to the Constitution of India
- Official Languages Commission
- List of languages by number of native speakers in India

Bal Sahitya Puraskar is given each year to writers for their outstanding works in the 24 languages, since 2010.

== Recipients ==
Following is the list of recipients of Bal Sahitya Puraskar for their works written in Konkani. The award comprises a cash prize of Rs. 50,000 and an engraved copper plaque.

Year	Author	Work	Genre	References
2010	Prakash Parienkar	Igadi Bigadi Tigadi Tha	Play	
2011	Gajanan Jog	Vors Fukat Vochunk Na	Novelette	
2012	Sudha Kharangate	Kanni Eka Sunnyachi	Story	
2013	Maya Anil Kharangate	Ranachya Manant	Novel	
2014	Surya Ashok	Bhurgyanlo Samsar	Stories	
2015	Ramnath Gawade	Sadu Ani Jadugar Mhadu	Novel	
2016	Dilip Borkar	Pintuchi Kallbhonvddi	Novelette	
2017	Vincy Quadros	Jaduchem Petul	Novel	
2018	Kumud Bhiku Naik	Monitor	Short Stories	
2019	Rajashree Bandodkar Karapurkar	Chitkulya Chinkichye Vishaal Vishwa	Stories	
2020	V. Krishna Vadhyar	Balu	Novelette	
2021	Sumedha Kamat Desai	Sumiche Cottangree	Short Novel	
2022	Jyoti Kunkolienkar	Mayuri	Novel	
2023	Tukaram Rama Shet	Jaan	Novel	
2024	Harsha Sadguru Shetye	Ek Ashil’lem Bayul	Novel	
2025	Nayana Adarkar	Betekaddo Shankar Aani Haar Karyo	Stories	

== See also ==
- List of Sahitya Akademi Award winners for Konkani
