= Palakala Seetharam Bhat =

Palakala Seetharam Bhat (16 August 1931 – 26 September 2017) was a Kannada writer. He received Bal sahitya puraskar for his Contribution to Children's Literature in 2012 by Sahitya Akademi.

== Background ==
Bhat served as a primary school and high school teacher at Jain High School, Moodabidri till his retirement in 1988. He started writing for children inspired by the works of Panje Mangesh Rao. He founded the "Shishu Sahitya Male" in 1954, which has brought out more than 100 books for children. He wrote 25 dramas, 58 collection of stories, 35 poems, and other works for children.

== Awards ==
- literary prize in 1955 instituted by the then Madras government.
- Rajarathnam Endowment Prize instituted by the Kannada Sahitya Parishat in 1983,
- The Bala Shikshan Parishat Prashasthi in 1984.
- The Karnataka State Sahitya Academy award in 1999,
- Shivaram Karanth Award in 2002.
- 2012 - Bala Sahitya Puraskara from Sahitya Akademi

== Poetry ==
- Eḷeyara geḷeya
- Kandana koḷalu
- Kiriyara kinnari
- Gāḷipaṭa
- Tam'mana tambūri
- Tim'mana tuttūri
- Puṭṭana pīpi
- Bālara bāvuṭa
- Yaku Gothilla
- makkaḷa muddu

== Books ==
- Baa Nanna Magane
- Bannada Meenu
- Haadi Kuni
- Kathe Helajjee
- Kittana Sahasa
- Ondu gidada atma kathe
- Parisara Kathegalu
- Puttiya guttu
