= K. V. Tirumalesh =

Indian writer (1940–2023)

- Born: 1940; Karadka, Kasargod, Madras Presidency, British India
- Died: 30 January 2023 (aged 82); Hyderabad, Telangana, India
- Occupations: Writer, professor
- Writing career
- Language: Kannada, English

K. V. Tirumalesh (1940 – 30 January 2023) was an Indian poet, writer and critic in the Kannada and English languages, and a retired professor. For his collections of poems Akshaya Kavya in Kannada (2010), he was awarded the Sahitya Akademi Award.

== Early life ==
Tirumalesh was born in 1940 in the village of Karadka in the Madras Presidency of British India (present-day Kasargod district, of the Indian State of Kerala). He held a master's degree in English literature and a doctorate degree in linguistics. He taught at the English and Foreign Languages University, Hyderabad.

== Career ==
Tirumalesh's career as a writer began in the 1960s when he wrote the collection of poems MukhavaaDagalu (Masks, 1968) in the Navya style, the modernist school of writing in Kannada literature. His Mahaprasthana (1990) was said to be the result of his exploration of ways of transcending the constraints of modernism. It dealt with the theme of disillusionment after victory, with the mythological heavenward journey of the Pandavas as the setting.

Tirumalesh's collection of poems, Akshaya Kavya (2010), as described by him is an "epic fragment". He elaborated: "Aksh aya Kavya imbibes this spirit in an extensive way . It is a long narrative sans story, sans didacticism, sans any aim, a sort of poetic sojourn with a lot of gaps. It is long and fragmentary at the same time: my models are Ezra Pound, William Carlos Williams and Charles Olson." The work won him the Sahitya Akademi Award for Kannada in 2015.

== Death ==
Tirumalesh died in Hyderabad on 30 January 2023, at the age of 82.

== Bibliography ==
=== Poetry collections ===
- Mukhavaadagalu/ಮುಖವಾಡಗಳು (Masks, 1968)
- Vathara/ವಠಾರ (Apartments, 1969)
- Mahaprasthana/ಮಹಾಪ್ರಸ್ಥಾನ (The Great March, 1971)
- Mukhamukhi/ಮುಖಾಮುಖಿ (Face to Face, 1978)
- "Avadha/ಅವಧ" (1988)
- "Paapiyoo... /ಪಾಪಿಯೂ" (1993)
- Akshaya Kavya/ಅಕ್ಷಯ ಕಾವ್ಯ (2010)
- "Aayda Kavitegalu/ಆಯ್ದ ಕವಿತೆಗಳು" (2011)
- "Arabbi/ಅರಬ್ಬಿ" (2015)

=== Novels/short stories ===
- "Tarangantaranga/ತರಂಗಾಂತರಂಗ"
- "Dawn Quixote/ಡಾನ್ ಕ್ವಿಕ್ಸೇೂಟ್"

=== Essays/criticism ===
- "Sammukha/ಸಮ್ಮುಖ"
- "Vyakti Mattu Paramparegalu/ವ್ಯಕ್ತಿ ಮತ್ತು ಪರಂಪರೆಗಳು"
- "Ullekha/ಉಲ್ಲೇಖ"
- "Ala-Nirala/ಆಳ-ನಿರಾಳ" (1–4)
- "Kavya Karana/ಕಾವ್ಯ ಕಾರಣ"
- "Namma Kannada/ನಮ್ಮ ಕನ್ನಡ"
- "Vagartha/ವಾಗರ್ಥ"
- "Vaachanashale/ವಾಚನಶಾಲೆ

=== Non-fiction ===
- Derrida's Heel of Achilles and Other Essays
- Grammar and Communication: Essays on the Form and Function of Language (1999)
- The Landscape of Language: Issues in Kannada Linguistics (2000)
