= Geetha Shenoy =

Indian writer

Geetha Shenoy is an Indian writer. She won the 2021 Sahitya Akademi Translation Prize in Konkani language for Bahujihwa Bharathik Ikyatachaya Aarathi, her translation of Vichara Krantige Ahvana by Kuvempu.
