= Milind Mhamal =

Indian librarian and translator

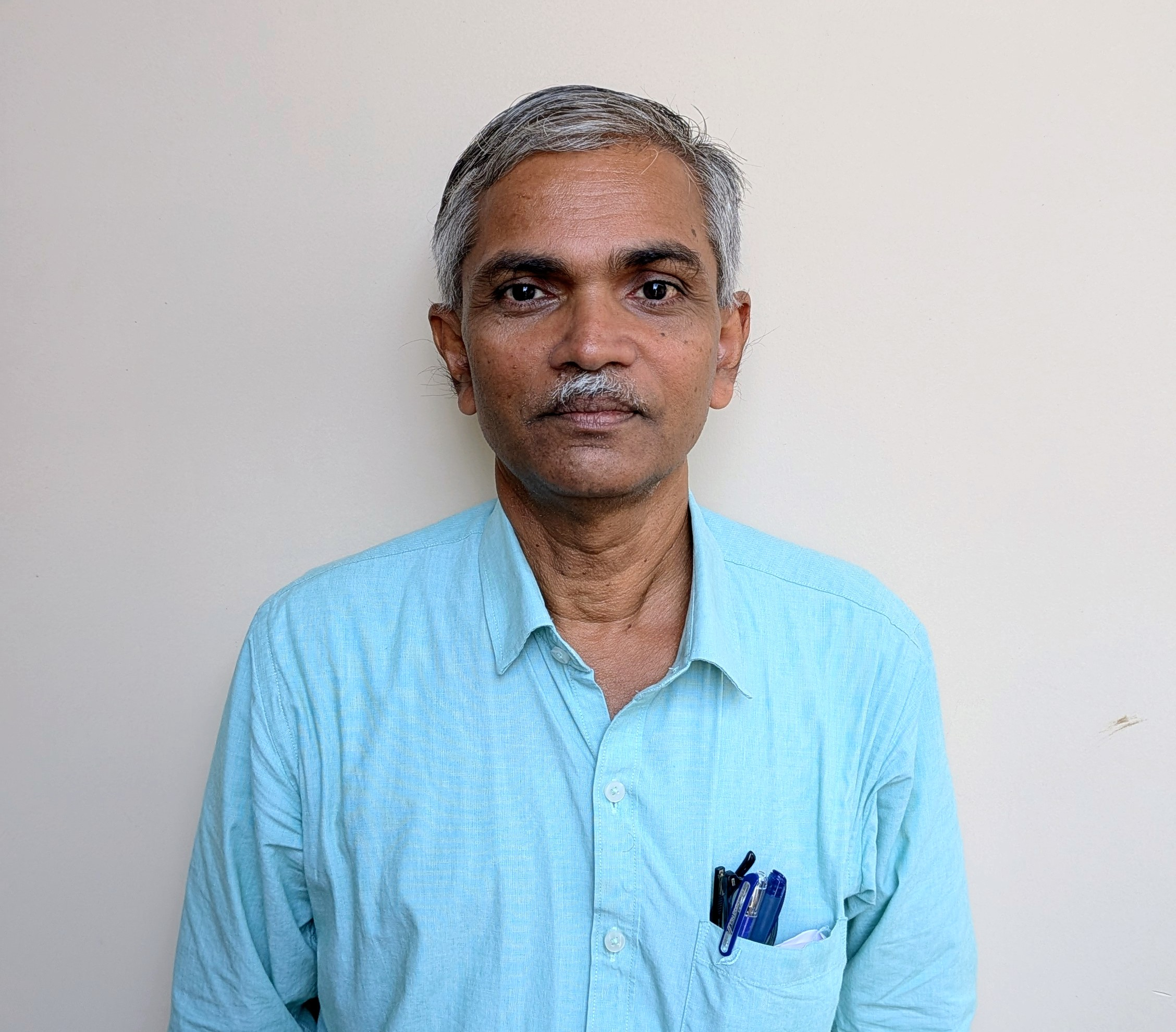
- Occupation: Librarian
- Writing career
- Language: Konkani
- Notable work: Bhartiya Tathvagineanachi Ruprekha
- Notable awards: Sahitya Akademi Translation Prize in Konkani (2024)

Milind Mhamal is an Indian librarian and translator from Goa. He won the 2024 Sahitya Akademi Translation Prize in Konkani for Bhartiya Tathvagineanachi Ruprekha, his translation of Outline of Indian Philosophy by M. Hiriyanna. Mhamal works as an Assistant Professor and Programme Director of Library and Information Science at the Goa Business School, Goa University.
