= Manikrao Gaunekar =

Indian writer and translator (c.1929–2025)

- Gaunekar in his later years
- Born: Manikrao Ram Nayak Gaunekar c. 1929
- Died: 2025 (aged 96); Goa, India
- Occupations: Writer, translator, educator
- Notable work: Shri Ram Krishna Amrutvani (translation)
- Awards: Sahitya Akademi Translation Prize (2022)

Manikrao Ram Nayak Gaunekar (c. 1929 – 2025) was an Indian writer, translator, and educator from Goa. He was known for his extensive contributions to Konkani literature, particularly for his translations of spiritual and philosophical works into the Konkani language. In 2022, he received the Sahitya Akademi Translation Prize for his book Shri Ram Krishna Amrutvani, a translation of the works of Ramakrishna Paramahansa.

== Career ==
Gaunekar had a long and distinguished career in the field of education and literature. He was an active member of the Konkani Bhasha Mandal, Goa, and the Akhil Bharatiya Konkani Parishad.

His literary work primarily focused on translating significant Indian philosophical texts into Konkani. He translated 1,600 verses of the Valmiki Ramayana into Konkani. In 2022, he received the Sahitya Akademi Translation Prize for his book Shri Ram Krishna Amrutvani, a translation of the works of Ramakrishna Paramahansa. Additionally, he authored works based on the teachings of Swami Vivekananda, including Bhakti Yoga and Karmayoga.

Beyond his literary pursuits, Gaunekar was a teacher by profession and was involved in various social and educational organizations. He was recognized for his lifetime service to the Konkani language and was a recipient of the Konkani Bhasha Mandal's Seva Puraskar.

== Awards and accolades ==
The Dnyanpeeth Ravindra Kelekar Konkani Bhasha Puraskar was awarded to Gaunekar for 2022–23. Also in 2022, he received the Sahitya Akademi Translation Prize for his book Shri Ram Krishna Amrutvani, a translation of the works of Ramakrishna Paramahansa.

== Death ==
Gaunekar died in 2025 at the age of 96. His passing was mourned by the literary community in Goa, with tributes paid by the Konkani Bhasha Mandal and the Akhil Bharatiya Konkani Parishad.
