= Geetha Nagabhushan =

Indian writer (1942–2020)

- Born: 25 March 1942; Savalagi, Gulbarga (Kalaburagi), Karnataka
- Died: 28 June 2020 (aged 78); Kalaburagi
- Occupation: Writer

Geetha Nagabhushan (25 March 1942 – 28 June 2020) was an Indian writer, novelist and academic, known for her works in Kannada. She became the first woman writer in Kannada to receive the Kendra Sahitya Academy Award for her novel "Baduku" in 2004.

== Early life ==
Geetha was born in 1942 in Savalagi to Shantappa and Sharanamma. She had 2 sisters and a brother. Her father, who was also a freedom fighter, worked in a cloth factory in Gulbarga.

== Personal life ==
Geetha married twice. Nagabhushan was her second husband with whom she had two children. After few years of marriage, Geetha was separated and lived with children.

== Literary works ==
Geetha's most known writings are novels. She has also published short stories, research books and essays.

=== Novels ===
- Thaavareya Hoovu
- Chandanada Chiguru
- Mahaamane
- Marali Mane
- Saptavarnada Swapna
- Maapura Thaayiya Makkalu
- Hasimamsa Mattu Haddugalu
- Aaghaatha
- Avaanthara
- Chakkiya Hareyada Dinagalu
- Badalaaguva Bannagalu
- Neelaganga
- Preethisiddu Ninnanne
- Mohvaa
- Ninna Tholugalalli
- Ninnolavu Nanagirali
- Savati Srigandha
- Nanna Ninna Naduve
- Chitrada Haadu
- Dhummasu
- Erilithagalu
- Asaregalu
- Nanna Olavu Ninna Cheluvu
- Dange
- Abhimana
- Baduku
- Kage Muttitu
- Baki
- Kappu Nela Kempu Hoovu
- Kaddumucchi

=== Story collections ===
- Jwalantha
- Avva Mattu Ithara Kathegalu
- Kyadigi Banadaga Katheyagi Ninthavaru

=== Research works ===
- Duruga Murugiyara Samskruthi

Dr. Geetha Nagabhushan's award winning novel, Baduku is now translated to English by Dr. Kusum Thantry and published by Kendra Sahitya Academy.
