= S. V. Ranganna =

Indian writer (1898–1987)

Salagame Venkatasubbayya Ranganna (24 December 1898 – 1987) was a writer in the Kannada language. He was an English professor in The University of Mysore. He was also a recipient of the Sahitya Akademi Award to Kannada Writers for his philosophical reflections in Ranga Binnapa. Some of his other works included Haasya among others. His spouse was Indiramma.

He presided the forty-ninth session of the Kannada Sahitya Parishat held at Shivamogga in 1976.
