= Narayan Bhaskar Desai =

Indian writer and translator

Narayan Bhaskar Desai is an Indian writer and translator. He won the 2018 Sahitya Akademi Translation Prize in Konkani language for Rajwade Lekhsangraha, a translation of Rajwade Lekh Sangraha by Vishwanath Kashinath Rajwade.
