= Sunetra Jog =

Indian translator

Sunetra Jog is an Indian translator from Goa. She won the 2024 Sahitya Akademi Translation Prize in Konkani.

== Career ==
Jog has translated multiple books into Konkani, including Sudha Murthy's first novel. She was thus chosen by the Sahitya Akademi to translate Malathi Rao's novel Disorderly Women into Konkani, titled Astavyasta Bayalo. The book features four generations of women from the same family and their struggles and is set in Mangaluru. The book was published in 2018. The book won the 2024 Sahitya Akademi Translation Prize in Konkani.

== Personal life ==
Sunetra Jog was married to Gajanan Jog, who won the 2017 Sahitya Akademi Award in Konkani. Gajanan died in 2023.
