= Tirukkural translations into Konkani =

As of 2023, Konkani has three translations available of the Tirukkural.

== Background ==
The first translation of the Kural text in Konkani is that by Narayana Purushothama Mallaya in 2002, which was published by Konkani Bhasha Prachar Sabha, Kochi, India. In 1987, while attending a translators' workshop organised by the Kendra Sahitya Akademi at Thiruvananthapuram, Mallaya, who was selected as the resource person for Konkani, was requested by the renowned Tamil writer Ka Na Subramaniam to translate the Kural. Mallaya spent the next one-and-a-half decades to translate all the 1330 couplets of the Kural text, which became his 18th work to appear in print. The translation was released by the former Supreme Court judge V. R. Krishna Iyer on 23 June 2002.

Another Konkani translation of the Kural text was made by Suresh Gundu Amonkar, who also translated the Dhammapada, Bhagavad Gita, Gospel of John and Dnyaneshwari.

Another translation was made in 2023 by Gowri R. Mallya, an artist and a writer, under the patronage of NITTE (deemed to be university), Deralakatte, Mangaluru. The university's curriculum director Nagesh Prabhu wrote the preface for the translation.

== Translations ==
Translation	Chapter 26, अद्याय २६, मांसाहाराथकून परिवृज	
Translation	Kural 254 (Couplet 26:4)	Kural 258 (Couplet 26:8)
N. Purushothama Mallaya (2002)	नयि हिंसा करचे असा अनुकंपा; असा अन्यथा हिंसकरचे, । जल्यारि खव्चे मृतजलेलयाले मांस नयि केदनाचि विवेक असचे ॥	दिव्य दृष्‍टि असिले, कोण अनुगमन कर्ता एक चूकिनत्तिले धर्मान । खवचेना शरीरं, जीव विमुक्त जले थकून ॥

== See also ==
- Tirukkural translations
- List of Tirukkural translations by language
