= Gokuldas Prabhu =

Indian writer (born 1954)

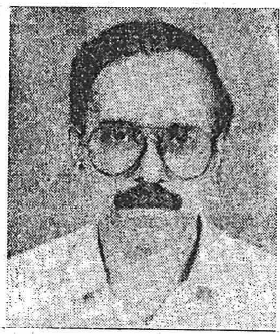
- Born: Krishna Gokuldas Prabhu; 28 December 1954 (age 71); Cherlai, Mattancherry, Cochin, Kerala, India
- Education: BSc, MA
- Alma mater: Sacred Heart College, Thevara; Madurai Kamaraj University
- Occupations: Author; translator; activist; banker
- Notable work: Prithivai Namah (1986); Antraayami (1991)
- Awards: Sahitya Akademi Award (1994); Sahitya Akademi Translation Prize (2002)

Krishna Gokuldas Prabhu (born 28 December 1954) is an Indian author, translator, and activist from Kerala who writes in the Konkani language. He is a recipient of the Sahitya Akademi Award and the Sahitya Akademi Translation Prize. He has served multiple terms as the president of the Akhil Bharatiya Konkani Parishad and as a member of the General Council of the Sahitya Akademi.

== Early life and education ==
Krishna Gokuldas Prabhu was born on 28 December 1954 in Cherlai, Mattancherry, Cochin, Kerala. He is a polyglot, fluent in Konkani, Malayalam, Tamil, Kannada, Hindi, and English.

He received his primary education in the Malayalam medium up to the sixth standard. He completed his Secondary School Leaving Certificate (SSLC) at the T.D. High School in Mattancherry and went on to obtain a Bachelor of Science (BSc) degree from Sacred Heart College in Thevara, Kerala. He holds a post-graduate degree in English literature from Madurai Kamaraj University in Madurai, Tamil Nadu.

== Career ==
In 1979, he began his professional career at the Corporation Bank.

=== Literary work ===
Prabhu's literary career began in 1981 with the publication of his first Konkani writing in the Kerala-based magazine Konkani Janata. He served as the editor of Rutu, a bimonthly Konkani poetry periodical, for five years. He has also contributed articles on the Konkani language to newspapers.

His major creative works include:

- Prithivai Namah (1986): A novel published in book form.
- Antraayami (1991): A collection of short stories published in the Devanagari script.

Prabhu is also a prolific translator, known for translating Malayalam literature into Konkani. His translation of M. T. Vasudevan Nair's classic novel Naalukettu, titled Chavki in Konkani, was well received. He also translated K. P. Ramanunni's Malayalam novel into Konkani as Soofeen Saangil’li Kaanni.

Prabhu has presented papers on Konkani language, literature, and folklore at events organised by the Sahitya Akademi, Delhi; the Kerala Sahitya Academy; the All India Konkani Parishad; Goa University; the World Konkani Centre, Mangaluru. His works have been translated into Kannada, Tamil, English, Telugu, and other languages. Notable translations include: Antar Āyāmi (अंतरआयामी) into Kannada by Dr Geeta Shenoy, Tamil (Ulparimanangal) by N. Gopinath Hegde, and English (The Being Within) by Pratima Asher; Rutu Sankramana into Kannada by Dr Geeta Shenoy and Telugu (Rutu Sankramanam) by Ranganatha Rao; and Prithivai Namah into Kannada (Prithvige Namana ) by Shakuntala Kini.

=== Activism and organizational roles ===
Prabhu has held several leadership positions in Konkani literary organizations. He served as the President of the 14th Akhil Bharatiya Konkani Sahitya Sammelan held at Porvorim, Goa, in April 2001, which was inaugurated by Gulzar. He has also been a member of the General Council of the Sahitya Akademi in New Delhi and is associated with the World Konkani Centre in Mangalore.

In 2014, he was elected as the President of the Akhil Bharatiya Konkani Parishad for the 2014–2016 term, taking charge during the 29th session in Belgaum. He was subsequently re-elected as president for the 2016–2020 term during an election held at the Institute Menezes Braganza in Panaji.

He continues to be active in literary circles, moderating sessions on Konkani language and culture. In 2020, he moderated a national-level virtual symposium for "Konkani Manyatha Dees", and in November 2024, he chaired a session on "Culture and Reading in Konkani" at the World Konkani Literature Festival held in Mangaluru.

== Works ==
=== As writer ===
1. Prithivai Namah, published in 1986, is a novelette depicting rural life and nature.
2. Antar Āyāmi is a collection of short stories published in 1991.

=== As editor ===
Prabhu edited an anthology of essays, Konkani Chaḷvaḷ Āni Mādhav Manjunāth Shānbhāg, in 2005.

=== As translator ===
1. Chavki, published in 1997, is a translation of M. T. Vasudevan Nair's Naalukettu.
2. Kaaḷ, a translation of M. T. Vasudevan Nair's Kaalam, was published in 2010.
3. Sūfīn Sāṅgillī Kāṇī is a translation of K. P. Ramanunni's novel Soofi Paranja Katha (2009).

== Awards and accolades ==
Prabhu has received numerous awards for his contributions to Konkani literature:

- 1993: Dr. T. M. A. Pai Foundation Award for his short story collection Antraayami.
- 1994: Sahitya Akademi Award for Antraayami.
- 2002: Sahitya Akademi Translation Prize for Chavki (translation of Naalukettu).
- 2005: Kullagar Award.
- 2010: Shyam R. S. Kakodkar Translation Award from the Konkani Kala Sahitya Kendra for Soofeen Saangil’li Kaanni.
- 2019: Gaurav Prashasti by Karnataka Konkani Sahitya Academy

He also served as the reception president for the All India Konkani Writers’ Conference held in Kochi in 1996.
