= Harsha Sadguru Shetye =

Harsha Sadguru Shetye is an Indian writer. She won the Bal Sahitya Puraskar 2024 in Konkani language for her 2021 novel, Ek Ashil'lem Bayul.

== Career ==
Her works include Motyanchi Mall (a book of essays), Mhoji Mati Mhoje Mollob (a collection of poems), , Anand Yatra (a travelogue), Goychi Shevni (a study on Goas birds) and Katha Rang (short stories). Her works for children include Jagma, Hanv Konn and Chala Bharat Bhonvuya.

== Awards ==
Shetye won the All India Poetess Conference award for her work Mhoji Mati Mhoje Mollob She was awarded by the Konkani Bhasha Mandal' for Anand Yatra. She won the Bal Sahitya Puraskar 2024 in Konkani language for her 2021 novel, Ek Ashil'lem Bayul
