= Sarasammana Samadhi =

Sarasammana Samadhi (Kannada: ಸರಸಮ್ಮನ ಸಮಾಧಿ) is a Kannada novel written by K. Shivaram Karanth. Through this novel Karanth gave a narrative of the Sati system and the social laws surrounding the marriage. For this novel Karanth won a Sahitya Akademi Award.
