= Gurunath Kelekar =

Indian freedom fighter and author (1929–2021)

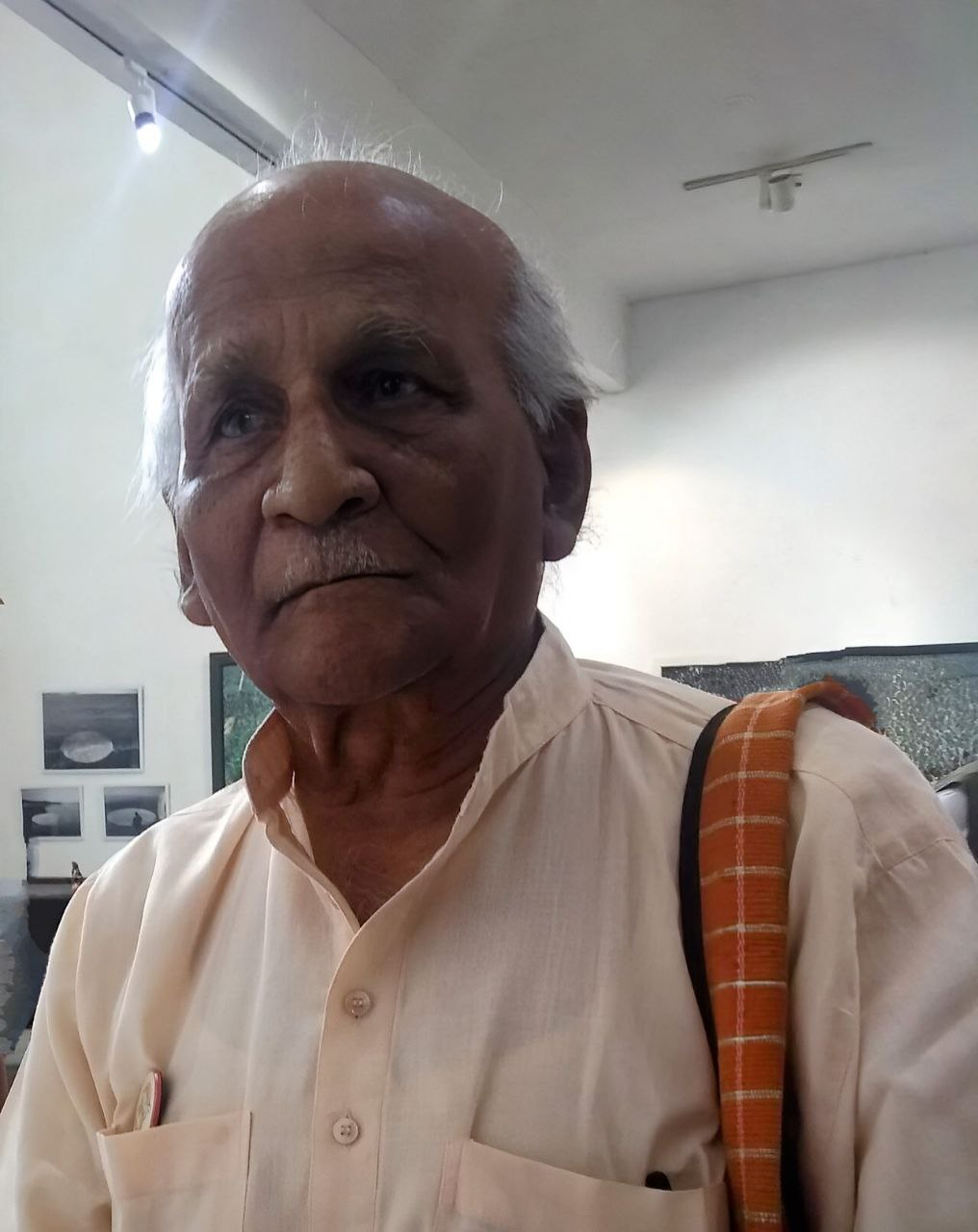
- Kelekar in 2018
- Born: Gurunath Shivaji Kelekar; 16 November 1929; Priol, Ponda taluka, Portuguese Goa
- Died: 19 January 2021 (aged 91); Taleigao, Goa, India
- Spouse: Kumudini Kelekar
- Children: 3
- Writing career
- Notable awards: Sahitya Akademi Translation Prize

Gurunath Shivaji Kelekar (16 November 1929 – 19 January 2021) was an Indian freedom fighter and author from Goa. He won the Sahitya Akademi Translation Prize for his translation of Mahatma Gandhi's The Story of My Experiments with Truth in Konkani.

== Life and career ==
Gurunath Shivaji Kelekar was born on 16 November 1929 in Priol. He completed his primary education from Bombay and was an active freedom fighter, even having been arrested multiple times. Notably, he was imprisoned in the Aguada jail for 13 months in 1954.

Following the Liberation of Goa, Kelekar was active in the promotion of Konkani language. He ran a fortnightly magazine, Novem Goem (transl. New Goa) from 1962 till 1970. From 1975 to 1982, he ran a weekly magazine titled Goencho Mog (transl. Love of Goa). Both these magazines were published in the Roman script. To fund this magazine when it was facing financial losses, Kelekar led a 67-day padayatra across the state to raise funds.

In the 1970s, Kelekar and his wife, Kumudini, ran a magazine for children titled, Maruti. He also published about 30 books for children. He then organised Konkani Sahitya Yatra (transl. Konkani Literature Trip) as a book fair across different parts of Goa.

He had authored 25 books, including the Konkani translation of Gandhi's The Story of My Experiments with Truth, which won him the Sahitya Akademi Translation Prize. As a follower of Gandhism, he also wrote a book about Gandhi in Konkani, titled, Kashe Ashille Gandhiji (transl. How was Gandhiji) in 2020. He was also a follower of Nehruvian philosophy and had a large collection of books dedicated to Gandhi and Nehru.

In his later years, he lamented the divisions between different Konkani speakers and advocated for the equality of all Konkani speakers across India.

In 2000, founded the Movement for Amity towards Roads in Goa (MARG) to spread road safety awareness among citizens. MARG would mainly conduct road safety awareness drives in schools so as to target younger audiences, reaching out to 70,000 students. Students were also taught Gandhian values through a programme titled Gandhiji's Children. Kelekar published a book titled MARG – Our Friend as a collection of road safety rules. MARG even had a branch outside Goa in Belgaum. Kelekar later founded the Nehru Centre - Institute for Citizenship and Civic Sense Education at Raia to promote civic sense through awareness programmes.

Kelekar was also an activist, protesting against the government on multiple occasions. One significant issue highlighted by him was about the condition of badels (local Goan women porters), which led to then Chief Minister of Goa Digambar Kamat to present them with financial assistance. Kelekar never associated himself with any political parties, religious or spiritual organisations and advocated for "a secular and liberal spirit of scientific enquiry".

He had three children, a son named Samir and daughters Sanjeevani Keni and Chitra Zuvarkar. He lived in Margao city.

Kelekar died on 20 January 2021 at his daughter's house in Taleigao and was cremated at the Margao crematorium. His funeral was attended by prominent Goans like Vijai Sardesai, Narendra Sawaikar, Pundalik Naik, Tomazinho Cardozo, Sandesh Prabhudesai and Prashanti Talpankar.
