= Shivarama Karantha Balavana =

- Location at Puttur
- Coordinates: 12°44′53.52″N 75°12′13.32″E 12° 44' 53.52 N 75° 12' 13.32 E
- Country: India
- State: Karnataka
- District: Dakshina Kannada
- City: Puttur
- Founded: 03.01.2002

The Shivarama Karantha Balavana is notable for its fame under the name of Jnanapeeta awardee Kota Shivarama Karanthar, who lived in Puttur. His home now houses a museum, a park, and a recreation center. This a multi-purpose tourist attraction, at Puttur, south part of Mangalore city in Karnataka, under trust managed District Administration of Dakshina Kannada and Kannada And Culture Department of Karntaka Government. It is a major tourist attraction of Puttur. It attracts large number of tourists due to the availability of multiple facilities.

== History ==
Balavana was the name Shivarama Karantha gave to the location, which was a nursery where kids could play and eat. Over the course of his more than 40-year residence here, Karanth produced a number of his literary masterpieces, engaged in a number of Yakshagana projects, and oversaw an experimental school. In this location, he lived and wrote frantically, developing and creating and breathing life into unforgettable characters like Choma in Chomana Dudi, Gopalaiah in Bettada Jeeva, or Mookajji of his novel.

== Kota Shivaram Karanth ==
Kota Shivaram Karanth (10 October 1902 – 9 December 1997), also abbreviated as K. Shivaram Karanth, was an Indian polymath, who was a novelist in Kannada language, playwright and an ecological conservationist. Ramachandra Guha called him the "Rabindranath Tagore of Modern India, who has been one of the finest novelists-activists since independence". He was the third writer to be decorated with the Jnanpith Award for Kannada, the highest literary honor conferred in India.

== Main Attractions ==
The state government created a committee to oversee this bustling cultural, recreational, and educational centre that was once Karanth's residence. Like its creator, it investigates a wide range of topics.

=== Art Gallery of Shivarama Karantha ===
In order to acquire 55 oil paintings linked to the books authored by Dr. Karanth and preserve them well mounted and protected for public viewing, some 50 artists have stepped forward to discuss the matter among themselves.

=== Shivarama Karanth's house ===
Dr. K. Shivarama Karanth's house is now the museum. Here, the audience can view Karanth's rare photos and the coveted Jnanapeeta award, which is regarded as the highest honour in the world of writing and which Karanth won for his book "Mookajjiya Kanasugalu."

=== Library ===
In close proximity to the museum is the library, including the open hall where Karanth is reported to have done much of his writing via the twisting staircase that is now strengthened. The library offers a good collection in addition to its ancient volumes.

== See also ==
- Kadri Park
- Tagore Park
- St. Aloysius Chapel
- Bejai Museum
- Aloyseum
