= Viswambhara =

Telugu-language long poem by C. Narayana Reddy

- Author: C. Narayana Reddy
- Language: Telugu
- Genre: Long poem
- Publication date: 1980
- Publication place: India
- Awards: Soviet Land Nehru Award (1982); Jnanpith Award (1988)

Viswambhara (transl. The Earth) is a 1980 Telugu-language philosophical long poem by C. Narayana Reddy. It is written in free verse and was an outcome of Narayana Reddy's meditation on the meaning and mystery of human existence. It deals with the theme of universal brotherhood and the quest of man for the meaning of life and of the nature of the universe.

Viswambhara received wide critical acclaim and is also a part of M.A. degree syllabi in some universities. In 1988, Narayana Reddy won India's highest literary award, Jnanpith Award for the book. He became the second Telugu writer to receive the Jnanpith Award through this work. The book also won the Soviet Land Nehru Award in 1982. It has been translated into several Indian languages. Amarendra (Dr. C. Narasimha Sastry) translated it into English in 1986. Bhimsen Nirmal translated it into Hindi as Vishwambhara. The Hindi translation won the Sahitya Akademi Translation Award in 1991.

== Reception ==
Sahitya Akademi appreciated the work noting, "This monumental work in free verse depicts the journey of man through the ages as he strives to attain spiritual, artistic, and scientific excellence." Dr. T. S. Chandra Mouli reviewed the book positively writing, "Viswambhara is a modern epic—Man is the protagonist. Cosmos is the canvas. Time eternal, time continuum plays a vital role in the drama narrated. The poet’s competent handling of the subject and comprehensive delineation, incorporating all momentary moments, extend a sharp edge in making this work a peerless classic."
