= Om Namo =

1999 book by Shantinath Desai

- Om namo : passages to India
- Author: Shantinath Desai
- Language: Kannada
- Genre: Fiction, Historical
- Published: 1999 Sapna Book House, Bengaluru.
- Publication place: India
- Media type: Print (Paperback)
- ISBN: 978-8189467272

Om Namo is a book written by Shantinath Desai. Author received 2000's Sahitya Akademi Award posthumously for this work. This book translated to Hindi by Dharenendra Kurakuri and to English by G. S. Amur. This work has his study of Jainism in Karnataka.

Om Namho tells two interrelated stories. The first of these which is a love story of two young British citizens, Adam Desai and Ann Eagleton, who come to India to conduct research in social anthropology. The second related to an old family belonging to Krishnapur located in the northern parts of Karnataka. This family undergoes modernization because of English exposure during India's twentieth century social changes.

The tv serial adaptation was commissioned by Prasar Bharathi and was directed by K. M. Chaitanya and produced by Girish Karnad.
