= C. Narayana Reddy =

Indian poet and writer (1931–2017)

Dr. C. Narayana Reddy
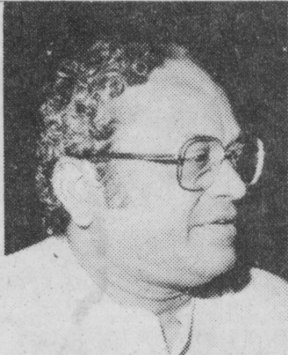
- Dr. C. Narayana Reddy.
- Born: 29 July 1931; Hanumajipet, Karimnagar, Hyderabad State, British India (now Rajanna Sircilla, Telangana, India)
- Died: 12 June 2017 (aged 85); Hyderabad, Telangana, India
- Education: Osmania University
- Occupations: Poet, playwright, composer, artist, professor, politician
- Awards: Sahitya Akademi Award (1973); Padma Shri (1977); Kala Prapoorna (1978); Jnanpith Award (1988); Padma Bhushan (1992)

Member of Parliament, Rajya Sabha
- In office 27 August 1997 – 26 August 2003
- Constituency: Nominated
- Website: Official website

Signature
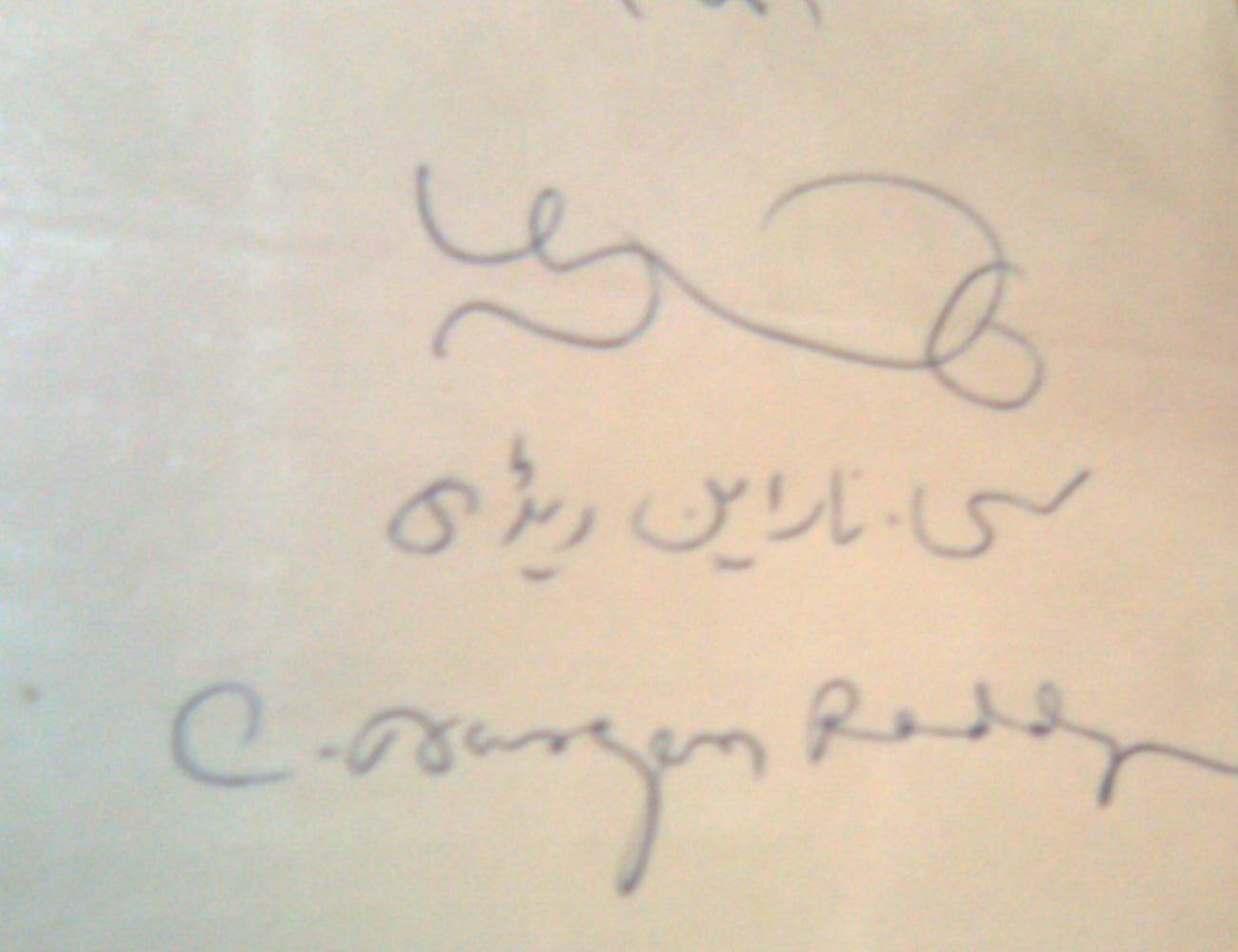

Cingireddi Narayana Reddy (29 July 1931 – 12 June 2017), popularly known as CiNaRe, was an Indian Telugu-language poet, writer, and critic. He had produced over eighty literary works including poems, prose-plays, lyrical plays, translations, and ghazals. He was also a professor, film lyricist, actor, and Rajya Sabha politician. He also served as the Vice Chancellor of Telugu University.

Narayana Reddy won several awards in his career including the Jnanpith Award, India's highest literary honour, for Viswambhara in 1988. He was conferred with the Sahitya Akademi Fellowship in 2014, the highest honour of the Sahitya Academy, India's National Academy of Letters. The Government of India honored him with the fourth and third highest civilian awards, Padma Shri (1977) and Padma Bhushan (1992).

Narayana Reddy also ventured into the film industry as a lyricist with the 1962 film Gulebakavali Katha. Subsequently, he penned the lyrics for more than 3,500 songs and won two state Nandi Awards for Best Lyricist.

== Early life and career ==
Cingireddi Narayana Reddy was born on 29 July 1931 in the village of Hanumajipet in present-day Rajanna Sircilla district of Telangana to a Telugu family of Malla Reddy and Buchamma. His father was a farmer and his mother was a housewife. He did his primary, secondary and higher secondary in Urdu medium as education in Telugu was not available under Nizam's rule. He studied Telugu privately during schooling in Sircilla under the guidance and tutelage of Gurus and Satavadhanis Seshadri Ramana Kavulu of Machilipatnam.

After completing his higher secondary education Karimnagar, he went on to study at the Osmania University, Hyderabad in 1949. He took Telugu as his subject during his graduation. Reddy received his Master of Arts degree in 1954 and became a college lecturer in 1955. He received Ph.D. in 1962 on "Modern Traditions of Telugu" and became a professor in 1976. He learned of modern Telugu literary giants and read books written by Gurram Jashua, Sri Sri, Devulapalli Krishna Sastry. He was mentored by the legendary poet and Jnanpith awardee Kavi Samrat Viswanatha Satyanarayana the first principal of Karimnagar Government College (1959–61).

Naryana Reddy married Suseela and with her had four daughters, Ganga, Yamuna, Saraswathi and Krishnaveni, named after famous rivers of India . Reddy instituted an award named after his wife which is presented annually to the female writers. Reddy was nominated to the Rajya Sabha, the upper house of the Indian Parliament, in August 1997.

== Literary works ==
Reddy's first published work was a poetry collection Navvani Puvvu (The Bashful Flower) in 1953 and later went on to publish several other works like Vennela Vada (The Monnlight Town, 1959), Jalapatham (The Waterfall), Divvela Muvvalu (Candle Bells, 1959), Rutu Chakram (Cycle of Seasons, 1964), Madhyatharagathi Mandahasam (The Smile of the Middle Class, 1968), and Mantalu Manavudu (Flames and the Man, 1970).

His 1980 published poetic work Viswambhara (The Earth) received wide critical acclaim and has been translated into several Indian languages like Kannada by Mr. Markandepuram Srinivas, Malayalam by Dr. Sushma Shankar. The Sahitya Akademi noted of it, "This monumental work in free verse depicts the journey of man through the ages as he strives to attain spiritual, artistic, and scientific excellence." Bhimsen Nirmal translated Viswambhara into Hindi as Viswambhara and his Telugu poetry collection Prapanchapadulu was translated into Sanskrit as Prapanchapadi by R. Sri Hari. Nirmal and Hari won the Sahitya Akademi Translation Award for these works in 1991 and 2001 respectively.

Reddy's Nagarjuna Sagaram is a Buddhist epic poetry based on a heart-breaking love story of a lady Santisri who comes to study Buddhism and falls in love with a sculptor Padmadeva. His 1957 Karpura Vasantha Rayulu was an epic poem retelling the romance between the King Kumara Giri of Reddy dynasty and his court dancer Lakuma. The book was dedicated to Telugu historian Mallampalli Somasekhara Sarma whose main contributions were regarding the recording of Reddy history.

Along with poetry, Reddy also composed musical plays Ramappa (1960), based on Kakatiya dynasty and the collection of ten plays Narayana Reddy Natikalu (Play-lets of Narayana Reddy, 1978). He published analysis of modern Telugu poetry, its precursors, its progression through various phases and its modern-day forms in Adhunikandhara Kavitamu - Sampradayamulu Prayogamalu: Modern Telugu Poetry Tradition and Experiment. His 1997 published book Matti Manishi Akasam (Man Beyond Earth and Sky) consists of a long poem of around hundred pages. He wrote a few travelogues about his travels to various countries including a tour of Malaysia in Muchataga Moodu Varalu, about Russia in Soviet Russsialo Padi Rojulu and about the United States, Canada, the United Kingdom, and France in Paschatya Desallo Yabai Rojulu.

== Film career ==
Reddy's first film as a lyricist was Gulebakavali Katha (1962) which was directed by N. T. Rama Rao. Reddy later went on to write more than 3000 film songs. His last song was for the film Inkennallu (2011) which was directed by Syed Rafi. He won the Nandi Award for Best Lyricist twice for the song "Kantene Amma Ani Ante Ela?" from the movie Preminchu (2001) and "Idigo Raayalaseema Gadda" from the movie Seetayya (2003).

== Bibliography ==
The following literary works of Reddy have been published:

1. Jalapatham (1953)
2. Navvani Puvvu (1953)
3. Viswageeti (1954)
4. Nagarjuna Sagaram (1955)
5. Narayana Reddy Geyalu (1955)
6. Ajantha Sundari (1955)
7. Swapna Bhangam (1957)
8. Karpura Vasantarayalu (1957)
9. Tene Patalu (1957)
10. Viswanatha Nayudu (1959)
11. Divvela Muvvalu (1959)
12. Vennelawada (1959)
13. Geya Natikalu (1959)
14. Vachanakavitha (Cini Kavi Manasnivali) (1959)
15. Ramappa (1960)
16. Cinare Geethalu (1963)
17. Rutu Chakram (1964)
18. Sama Darsanam (1964)
19. Aksharala Gavakshalu (1965)
20. Vyasavahini (1965)
21. Jati Ratnam (1967)
22. Adhunikandhra Kavitvam (1967)
23. Sampradaya Reethulu (1967)
24. Madhyatharagathi Mandahasam (1968)
25. Maro Harivillu (1969)
26. Gandhiyam (1969)
27. Meerabai (1969)
28. Mantalu - Manavudu (1970)
29. Mukhamukhi (1971)
30. Manishi - Chilaka (1972)
31. Mandhara Makarandhalu (1973)
32. Patalo Emindi - Na Matalo Emundhi (First Volume) (1974)
33. Patalo Emindi - Na Matalo Emundhi (Second Volume) (1974)
34. Marpu Na Tirpu (1974)
35. Sikharalu Loyalu (1974)
36. Tejassu Na Tapassu (1975)
37. Taratarala Telugu Velugu (1975)
38. Pagale Vennela (1976)
39. Inti Peru Chaitanyam (1976)
40. Bhoomika (1977)
41. Narayana Reddy Natikalu (1978)
42. Mathanam (1978)
43. Mrutyuvu Nunchi (1979)
44. Muthyala Kokila (1979)
45. Viswambhara (1980)
46. Soviet Russia lo Padi Rojulu (1980)
47. Maa Ooru Matladindi (1980)
48. Rekkalu (1982)
49. Amara Veerudu Bhagat Singh (1982)
50. Nadaka Na Talli (1983)
51. Kalam Anchu Mida (1985)
52. Telugu Gazallu (1986)
53. Kavitha Na Chirunama (1988)
54. Arohana (1991)
55. Jathiki Oopiri Swatantryam (1993)
56. Drukpatham (1994)
57. Bhoogolamanta Manishi Bomma (1996)
58. Matti Manishi Aakasam (1997)
59. Gadilo Samudram (1998)
60. Vyaktitvam (1999)
61. Dooraalanu Doosukotchi (2000)
62. Muchataga Moodu Varalu (2001)
63. Paschatya Desallo Yabai Rojulu. (2001)
64. Samooham Vaipu (2008)
65. Manishiga Jeevinchalani (2009)
66. Viswam Nalo Unnappudu (2010)
67. Nachoopu Repati Vaipu (2011)
68. Vakkuku Vayasu Ledu (2012)
69. Lethakiranalu (2013)
70. Alalethe Adugulu (2013)
71. Ningikegirina Chetlu (2014)
72. Cinare Gazallu
73. Prapancha Padulu
74. Kalam Sakshiga
75. Udayam Na Hrudayam
76. Jathiya Kavi Sammelanamloni Vividha Bhasha Kavithala Anuvaadhalu
77. Telugukavitha Layathmakatha
78. Saptati Oka Liptaga
79. Moving Spirit (English)
80. Rekkala Santhakalu
81. Jwalaga Jeevinchalani
82. Konagotimida Jeevitham
83. Kalisi Nadiche Kalam
84. Evee Aa Jeeva Nadhulu
85. That's What I said (English)

== Discography ==
Year	Song(s)	Film	Music Director	Ref(s)
1962	Nannu Dhochukunduvate	Gulebakavali Katha	Joseph, Vijaya Krishna Murthy	
1964	Telisindile Telisindile	Ramudu Bheemudu	Pendyala Nageswara Rao	
1964	Pagale Vennela	Pooja Phalam	Saluri Rajeswara Rao	
1966	Changure Bangaru Raja	Sri Krishna Pandaveeyam	T. V. Raju	
1969	Bhale Manchi Roju	Jarigina Katha	Ghantasala	
1969	Enthavaru Gaani	Bhale Thammudu	T. V. Raju	
1970	Telugu Jaathi Manadi	Thalla? Pellama?	T. V. Raju	
1970	Ee Reyi Theeyanadi	Chitti Chellelu	Saluri Rajeswara Rao	
1972	Gunna Mamidi Komma Meedha	Bala Mitrula Katha	Satyam	
1973	Ee Jeevana Tharangalalo	Jeevana Tarangalu	J. V. Raghavulu	
1974	Vasthadu Naa Raju	Alluri Seetarama Raju	P. Adinarayana Rao	
1976	Naa Madhi Ninnu Pilichindi	Aradhana	Saluri Hanumantha Rao	
1977	Chithram Bhalaare Vichitram	Dana Veera Soora Karna	Pendyala Nageswara Rao	
1978	Sipaayi O Sipaayi	Akbar Salim Anarkali	C. Ramchandra	
2001	Kantene Amma Ani Ante Ela?	Preminchu	M. M. Srilekha	
2003	Idigo Raayalaseema Gadda	Seetayya	M. M. Keeravani	

== Awards ==
Reddy won several awards for his literary work which includes the Sahitya Akademi Award in 1973 for his poetry collection Mantalu Manavudu, the Jnanpith Award for Viswambhara in 1988 and was conferred with the Sahitya Akademi Fellowship in 2014, the highest honour of the Sahitya Akademi, India's National Academy of Letters. Reddy was also awarded an honorary Kala Prapoorna by Andhra University in 1978, the Soviet Land Nehru award in 1982, and the Raja-Lakshmi Award by the Sri Raja-Lakshmi Foundation in 1988, "Visishta Puraskaram" of the Potti Sriramulu Telugu University in 2011. The Government of India honored him with the fourth and third highest civilian awards, Padma Shri (1977) and Padma Bhushan (1992).

He also won the Nandi Award for Best Lyricist twice for the song "Kantene Amma Ani Ante Ela?" from the movie Preminchu (2001) and "Idigo Raayalaseema Gadda" from the movie Seetayya (2003).

== Death ==
Reddy developed health complication and complained of chest pain and was shifted to the Care Hospital. He died on 12 June 2017 at the age of 85.
