= Guru Amonkar =

Indian cricketer

Guru Amonkar was an Indian cricketer who played for Goa.

Amonkar made a single first-class appearance for the team, against Kerala in the 1985–96 Ranji Trophy. He scored seven runs in the first innings of the match, and five runs in the second, as Kerala won the match by a six-wicket margin.
