= K. V. Narayana =

Indian Kannada writer (born 1948)

K V Narayana
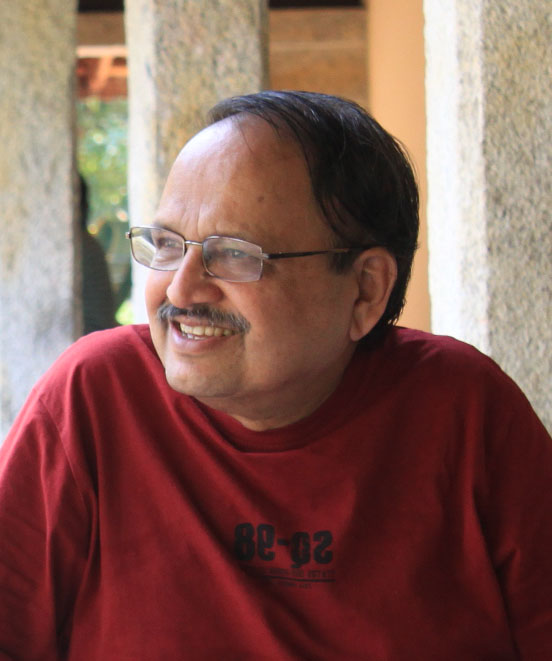
- Born: 20 October 1948 (age 78); Kampalapura, Piriyapattana Taluk, Mysore District, Karnataka, India
- Died: 06 November 2026
- Other name: KVN
- Education: Mysore University, Bangalore University
- Occupations: Professor of Kannada Language and Literature, Linguist, Chairman-ಕುವೆಂಪು ಭಾಷಾ ಭಾರತಿ ಪ್ರಾಧಿಕಾರ
- Writing career
- Notable awards: Karnataka Sahitya Academy Award (Honorary); Rajyotsava Prashasti

Kampalapura Veeranna Narayana (1948 - 2026), also known as KVN, was an Indian linguist, professor of Kannada language and literature, and a literary critic. He is currently the Chairman of the Kuvempu Bhasha Bharathi Pradikara, Government of Karnataka. He hails from Piriyapattana in Mysore district. During his time as a professor in Bangalore University, he initiated investigations into Kannada language and culture from the root level. He served as the registrar of Hampi Kannada University. His major areas of interest are Kannada language, literature, teaching and science.

He received the Karnataka Sahitya Akademi Honorary Award for a lifetime's contribution to Kannada language and literature. He initiated a series of workshops on Kannada, what he calls Karnataka Odu, a special knowledge zone on Kannada.

== Early life and education ==
KVN received his primary education in his birthplace, Kampalapura. He pursued his pre-university education in Science at the National College, Bengaluru. Though he had an opportunity to study engineering he decided against it; instead he pursued a Bachelor of Science in Yuvaraja college, Mysore. Subsequently, he completed his B.Ed and became a teacher in a high school. He was introduced to linguistics at a summer school in Mysore during 1972. Later, he moved to Bengaluru to further his education. It is during this he began to make his mark as a writer. He chose literature for his further studies. He then received his M.A. (Kannada Literature) from Central College, Bangalore University. This is where he met Shrimathi, his future wife, who was a well-known feminist. He began teaching at Bangalore's National college. He joined the Kannada Adhyana Kendra, which was headed by GS Shivarudrappa (GSS), under whose guidance he studied "Anandavardana's Dwanyaloka" and acquired his Ph.D.

== Career ==
KVN taught literature, literary criticism, and linguistics. Scientific temperament formed the basis of his growth as a literary critic, linguist and cultural thinker of Kannada. He was a visiting professor at Stony Brook University in 1984. He was a senior fellow for two years at the Central Institute of Indian Languages, Mysore. In 1993, he joined Hampi Kannada University as a Kannada professor. Later, he went on to become the registrar of this university. He also took up the roles of the Dean and acting Vice-Chancellor many times. During his tenure, he played a prominent role in building the Kannada Vishwavidyala through his diligent administration and studies. After 15 years of service, he retired from the university in 2007.

He is currently the president of the Kuvempu Bhasha Bharathi Pradikara, Government of Karnataka.

== Books ==
- Beru, Kanda, Chiguru (1997)
- Bhasheya Sutthamuttha
- Matthe Bhasheya Sutthamuttha (1998)
- Anke Tappida Artharo Uyi
- Kannada Jagattu Ardhashatamaana
- Nammodane Namma Nudi
- Sahitya Tatva - Bendre Dristi
- Kannadada Ulikantegalu: Kannada Adunudiya Sollarime - 1
- Stalanamagalu - Parivatane Mattu Prabhava
- ShailiShastra - Sahitya Paribhashika Male
- Bhaashe (Kannada Vishvakosha)
- Dhvanyalokada Oodu
- Tondumevu (in 9 volumes)
- Dhvanyaloka: Ondu Adhyayana (1988)
- Vyaktinamagalu: Swarupa Mattu Visleshane (2000)

Co-authored:

- Krushipada Kosha
- Gowrava (2001)
- Kavyartha Padakosha
- Preethisuvudendare
- Kannada Manasu - Engineering Prathama Padavi

== Plays ==
- Huttava Badidare

== Awards ==
- Karnataka Sahitya Akademi Award (Honorary) (2007)
- GSS Award for Literary Criticism (2007)
- Karnataka Rajyotsava Award(Literature) (2010)
- L Basavaraju Award (2003)

== See also ==
- Kannada
- Kannada literature
