= Narayana Purushothama Mallaya =

Indian author (born 1929)

- Born: 7 May 1929 (age 97); Mattancherry, Kochi, Kerala, India
- Occupations: Writer, literary activist
- Children: Dr Nagesh P Mallaya
- Parent: N. M. Saraswathi Bhai
- Awards: Padma Shri; Sahitya Academy Award; Konkani Pitamaha

Narayana Purushothama Mallaya is an Indian author, known for his activism for Konkani language and literature. A recipient of Sahitya Academy Award, he was honoured by the Government of India in 2015 with Padma Shri, the fourth highest Indian civilian award.

== Biography ==
Narayana Purushothama Mallaya was born on 7 May 1929 in Mattancherry, a coastal town in Kochi, in the South Indian state of Kerala to N. M. Saraswathi Bhai, reportedly the first woman teacher in the state. He did his early education at T. D. School, Mattancherry and the Government Commercial Institute, Ernakulam. He started his career as a teacher by founding Ramakrishna Technical Institute in 1958, a commerce institute recognized by the state government.

Mallaya is reported to have initiated the movement against the 1951 census report classifying Konkani as a dialect of Marathi and was successful in getting a language status for Konkani by the time the next census report was published in 1961. In 1966, he initiated a movement for getting national language status for Konkani by appealing to Indira Gandhi, then Prime Minister of India and the efforts were successful in 1992 when the language was included in the 8th Schedule. His contributions are also reported in the establishment of Konkani Prachar Sabha and a chair for Konkani language studies at Mahatma Gandhi University, Kottayam.

Mallaya has authored 21 books including Vedanta Bhushan Guruji Pandit Narayana Anantha Sarma Sastri Satakam, a Konkani poem of 100 verses with English translation and a translation of Tamil epic, the Tirukkural, composed of 1330 couplets in 133 chapters, into Konkani language. He has translated Jnanappana and several other notable works of Vallathol and Rabindra Nath Tagore besides authoring biographies of N. M. Saraswati Bhai, Suniti Kumar Chatterji and Dr. T. M. A. Pai in verses. Govinda Pai Satakam and Calcutta Nagari Varnana are two of his other notable works.

Mallaya has received the Sahitya Academy Award for Konkani literature and is a recipient of the title, Konkani Pitamaha from the Konkani Bhasha Prachar Sabha in 2005, The Government of India included him in the Republic Day honours list, in 2015, for the civilian award of Padma Shri.

== See also ==
- Konkani language
- Konkani language agitation
- Tirukkural translations into Konkani
- List of translators
