= Ravindra Amonkar =

Indian theatre artist

- Occupation: Theatre director

Ravindra Amonkar is an Indian theatre artist and director and also a previous vice-chairman of Bal Bhavan Goa.

== Early life ==
Amonkar founded production houses like Navrang Stars and Vakratund and children's stage movement (Baalnatya Chalval) in Goa.

== Career ==
Amonkar has worked with Sangeet Natak, and promoted children's theatre in Goa as Vice Chairperson of Bal Bhavan. From school level to Higher Secondary level he's organised workshops, competitions, and taught acting in telefilms specially meant for children.

=== Goa's traditional arts ===
Amonkar is associated with the festive traditional theatre in Goa, and has contributed by directing youngsters and the professional actors. He has also taken the traditional stage to the National level and held positions on the executive and general body committee of Kala Academy, Akhil Bharatiya Marathi Natya Parishad, Akhil Govmantak Marathi Natya Maha Sangh, Goa College of Music, West Zone Culture (Udaipur), Sahitya Sevak Mandal, Saraswati Mandir, Directorate of Art & Culture, Government of Goa.

=== Government ===
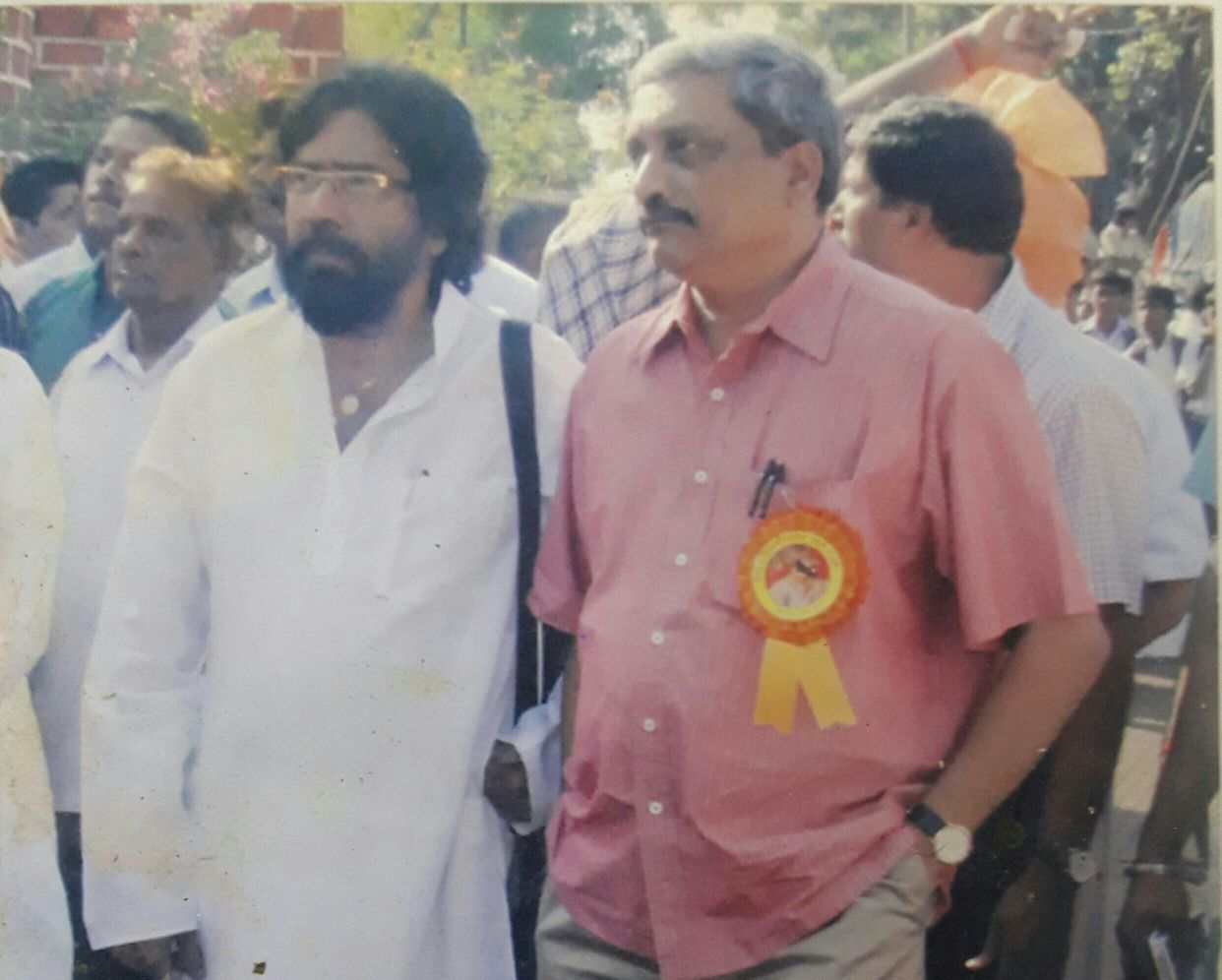
Amonkar with Chief Minister of Goa Manohar Parrikar

- Served as a member of Executive in Kala Academy — Goa.
- Served as a member of the General board in Kala Academy — Goa.
- Served as Chairman of State Cultural Awards selection Committee of Department of Arts and Culture — Government of Goa.
- Esteemed member of judgement team for State level competition in Goa & also judged competitions in Maharashtra State and Delhi.
- Served as a resource person on almost all the forums related to theatre in Goa.
- Presently serving as Vice Chairman of Bal Bhavan — Goa.

== See also ==
- Akhil Bharatiya Marathi Natya Parishad
- Cinema of India
- Konkani cinema
- Kala Academy
- Marathi theatre
