= Gajanan Jog =

Indian writer (1952–2023)

Gajanan Jog (1952 – 21 April 2023) was an Indian writer recognized for his contributions to contemporary Konkani literature. He won the 2011 Sahitya Akademi Bal Sahitya Puraskar and the 2017 Sahitya Akademi Award for Khand Ani Her Katha, a collection of Konkani short stories. Jog was born in Sakhorde and died in Taleigão.

He was married to translator Sunetra Jog, who won the 2024 Sahitya Akademi Translation Prize in Konkani.
