= Bal Sahitya Puraskar 2024 =

Children's literature awards in 2024

- Awarded for: Literary awards for children's literature in Indian languages
- Sponsored by: Sahitya Akademi, Government of India
- Reward: ₹ 50,000
- Website: Official website

The Bal Sahitya Puraskar 2024 (transl. Children's literature award), also known as Sahitya Akademi Bal Sahitya Puraskar 2024, is a 2024 literary honour in India, which the Sahitya Akademi, India's National Academy of Letters, annually confers on writers for their contribution in the field of Children's literature in any of the 22 languages of the 8th Schedule to the Indian constitution as well as in English and Rajasthani language. It comprises a cash prize of Rs. 50,000 and an engraved copper plaque.

== Recipients by language ==
| Languages | Authors | Works | Genres | References |
|---|---|---|---|---|
| Assamese | Ranju Hazarika | Biponna Bismoi Khel | Novel | |
| Bengali | Dipanwita Roy | Mahidadur Antidote | Novel | |
| Boro | Virgin Jekova Machahary | Buhuma Boynibw | Poetry | |
| Dogri | Bishan Singh 'Dardi' | Kukdu Kadoon | Poetry | |
| English | Nandini Sengupta | The Blue Horse and Other Amazing Animals from Indian History | Historical Fiction | |
| Gujarati | Gira Pinakin Bhatt | Hasati Haveli | Stories | |
| Hindi | Devender Kumar | 51 Baal Kahaniyan | Stories | |
| Kannada | Krishnamurthy Biligere | Choomantrayyana Kathegalu | Short Stories | |
| Kashmiri | Muzaffar Hussain Dilbar | Sone Gobrew | Poetry | |
| Konkani | Harsha Sadguru Shetye | Ek Ashil’lem Bayul | Novel | |
| Maithili | Narayanjee | Anar | Short Stories | |
| Malayalam | Unni Ammayambalam | Algorithangalude Nadu | Novel | |
| Meitei | Kshetrimayum Subadani | Malem Atiya | Novel | |
| Marathi | Bharat Sasane | Samsher Aani Bhootbangala | Novel | |
| Nepali | Basanta Thapa | Desh Ra Fuchhey | Poetry | |
| Odia | Manas Ranjan Samal | Gapa Kalika | Short Stories | |
| Punjabi | Kuldeep Singh Deep | Mai Jalianwala Bagh Bolda Haan | Play | |
| Rajasthani | Prahlad Singh 'Jhorda' | Mhari Dhani | Poetry | |
| Sanskrit | Harshadev Madhav | Bubhukshitah Kakah | Short Stories | |
| Santali | Dugai Tudu | Miru Arang | Poetry | |
| Sindhi | Lal Hotchandani 'Lachaar' | Dostan ji Dosti | Stories | |
| Tamil | Yuma Vasuki | Thanviyin Piranthanal | Stories | |
| Telugu | P. Chandrashekhar Azad | Maya Lokam | Novel | |
| Urdu | Shamsul Islam Farooqi | Barf Ka Des Antarctica | Short Stories | |

== See also ==
- Sahitya Akademi Award
- Yuva Puraskar
