= Shantinath Desai =

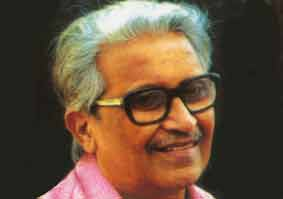
- Born: Shantinath Kuberappa Desai; 22 July 1929; Haliyal, Karnataka, India
- Died: 26 March 1998 (aged 68); Kolhapur, Maharashtra, India
- Resting place: Kolhapur
- Education: Karnataka University Dharwad (MA, PhD)
- Occupations: Writer, Professor
- Spouse: Sumitra Desai
- Children: Sucheta, Rashmi, Madhavi, Deepti (Oldest to Youngest)
- Writing career
- Language: Kannada and English
- Years active: 1955-1998
- Genre: Fiction
- Notable works: Mukti and Om Namo
- Notable awards: Sahitya Akademi Award 2000
- Movement: Navya

Shantinath Kuberappa Desai (1929–1998) was one of the leading modern authors of the Navya (modernist) movement in Kannada Literature.

In most of his novels, short stories, and essays, Desai explores the challenges of a changing society and its drift from traditional values. His first novel, Mukti (1961), narrates the protagonist's quest for an independent identity, liberation from the influence of a friend and his infatuation with the friend's sister. The second novel, Vikshepa (1971), tells the story of a village youth from northern Karnataka, who attempts to flee from his traditional environment by studying English in Bombay and later relocating to England. He was one of the best known writers in the genre of short stories in Kannada literature, which includes other prominent writers like U. R. Anantha Murthy, Yashwant Chittal, P. Lankesh, Ramachandra Sharma, Rajalakshmi Rao, and K. Sadashiva.

His novel Om Namo (Obeisance) won the Sahitya Akademi Award. Desai's important works include Mukti (Liberation) and Beeja (The Seed).

Shantinath Desai was also a professor of English at Shivaji University in Kolhapur, and later became the first vice chancellor of the then newly founded Kuvempu University in Shimoga. He has written seven novels and eight short story collections of which Rakshasa (1977) received the Karnataka Sahitya Academy Award. His novels and stories have been frequently translated into various regional languages. He also published a book of critical works in English.

Shantinath Desai is remembered for his works such as Mukti, Om Namo, Srishti and Beeja (Novels) and short stories like Kshitija, Naanan Tirthayatre, Ganda Satta Mele, Manjugadde, Dande, Parivartane, Kurmavatara, Rakshasa, Nadiya Neeru, Hero, Bharamya Hogi Nikhilanagiddu, Digbhrame and other works. His readers and admirers feel that he deserved more honours and recognition than he actually received. He got Sahitya Akademi Award posthumously for his novel Om Namo in 2000. He is considered as one of the important writers in modern Kannada literature.

== Collection of Stories ==
- Manjugadde/ಮಂಜುಗಡ್ಡೆ - 1959
- Kshithija/ಕ್ಷಿತಿಜ - 1966
- Dande/ದಂಡೆ - 1971
- Rakshasa/ರಾಕ್ಷಸ - 1977
- Parivarthane/ಪರಿವರ್ತನೆ - 1982
- Aayda Kathegalu/ಆಯ್ದ ಕಥೆಗಳು - 1987 (Text Edition)
- Koormavathara/ಕೂರ್ಮಾವತಾರ - 1988
- Aayda Kathegalu/ಆಯ್ದ ಕಥೆಗಳು - 2007
- Samagra Kathegalu/ಸಮಗ್ರ ಕಥೆಗಳು - 2001 (An Anthology of Complete Short Stories)

== Novels ==
- Mukti/ಮುಕ್ತಿ - 1961 (Translated in all the 14 Indian Languages by National Book Trust)
- Vikshepa/ವಿಕ್ಷೇಪ - 1973
- Srushti/ಸೃಷ್ಟಿ - 1979
- Sambandha/ಸಂಬಂಧ - 1982
- Beeja/ಬೀಜ - 1983
- Antarala/ಅಂತರಾಳ - 1993
- Om Namo/ಓಂ ನಮೋ - 1999 (Translated in all the 14 Indian Languages by Sahitya Akademi)

== Poetry ==
- Shantinath Desai Avara Kavithegalu/ಶಾಂತಿನಾಥ ದೇಸಾಯಿ ಅವರ ಕವಿತೆಗಳು - 2016

== Criticism ==
- Sahitya Mattu Bhaashe/ಸಾಹಿತ್ಯ ಮತ್ತು ಭಾಷೆ - 1980
- Kannada Kadambari Nadedu Banda Reethi/ಕನ್ನಡ ಕಾದಂಬರಿ ನಡೆದು ಬಂದ ರೀತಿ - 1989
- Navya Sahitya Darshana/ನವ್ಯ ಸಾಹಿತ್ಯ ದರ್ಶನ - 1989
- M. N. Roy/ಎಂ. ಎನ್. ರಾಯ್ - 1994

== Translation ==
- Mee/ಮೀ
- Rathachakra/ರಥಚಕ್ರ
- Premchand/ಪ್ರೇಮಚಂದ

== English works ==
- Experimentation with Language in Indian Writing in English (Fiction)
- Babhani Bhattacharya
- Santha Ramrao
- Indian Poetry Today (Kannada)
- Contemporary Indian Short Stories (Editor)
- Avasthe (U. R. Ananthamurthy)
- Here Revolution Comes (P. Lankesh)

== About Him and His literature ==
- Shantinath Desai (Biography)/ಶಾಂತಿನಾಥ ದೇಸಾಯಿ - G. S. Amur/ಜಿ. ಎಸ್. ಆಮೂರ
- Shantinath Desai (Biography)/ಶಾಂತಿನಾಥ ದೇಸಾಯಿ - Preeti Shubhachandra/ಪ್ರೀತಿ ಶುಭಚಂದ್ರ
- Shantinath Desai Avara Sahitya/ಶಾಂತಿನಾಥ ದೇಸಾಯಿ ಅವರ ಸಾಹಿತ್ಯ - Giraddi Govindraj (Ed.)/ಗಿರಡ್ಡಿ ಗೋವಿಂದರಾಜ
- Shantinath Desai Sahitya Vaachike/ಶಾಂತಿನಾಥ ದೇಸಾಯಿ ಸಾಹಿತ್ಯ ವಾಚಿಕೆ - Ramachandra Deva (Ed.)/ರಾಮಚಂದ್ರ ದೇವ (ಸಂ.)
- Desai Kathana/ದೇಸಾಯಿ ಕಥನ - T.P.Ashok/ಟಿ.ಪಿ.ಅಶೋಕ

== Awards ==
- Karnataka Sahitya Akademi Award for his short story collection Rakshasa/ರಾಕ್ಷಸ (1978)
- Sahitya Akademi Award for Om Namo/ಓಂ ಣಮೋ (2000)
- The Ideal Teacher Award by the Government of Maharashtra
- Rajyotsava Award by Government of Karnataka
- Karnataka Sahitya Akademi Honorary Award for Lifetime Achievement (1984)
- Sudha Magazine Award for his novel Sambandha/ಸಂಬಂಧ (1982)

== Teleserial ==
- Om Namo/ಓಂ ಣಮೋ (DD Chandana) Directed by Girish Karnad and K. M. Chaitanya
- Digbhrame/ದಿಗ್ಭ್ರಮೆ (DD Chandana)
