= Gopalakrishna Pai =

Indian writer

- Occupation: Writer
- Writing career
- Language: Kannada
- Notable awards: Kendra Sahitya Akademi Award

Gopalakrishna Pai is an Indian writer of fiction and non-fiction books in the Kannada language. Pai is the author of the book Swapna Saraswata.

== Awards ==
Pai has received the Karnataka Sahitya Academic award, Centre's Kendra Sahitya Academi Award.
