= Suresh Amonkar (writer) =

Indian educationist (1935–2019)

- Born: 22 March 1935; Goa, Portuguese India
- Died: 8 December 2019 (aged 84)
- Occupations: Writer; educationist; translator
- Spouse: Sudha Amonkar
- Awards: Padma Shri (2009)

Suresh Gundu Amonkar (22 March 1935 – 8 December 2019) was an Indian educationist, writer, and chairman of Goa Board of Secondary and Higher Secondary Education. He served as the director of State Literacy Mission and Adult Education, as the Chief Commissioner of Goa State chapter of the Bharat Scouts and Guides and as the president of the Council of Boards of Secondary Education (COBSE).

== Works ==
He translated several classics into Konkani language, including Dhammapada, Tirukkuṛaḷ, Bhagavad Gita, Gospel of John and Dnyaneshwari. He was a recipient of the Goa State Teacher's Award and the 2012 Jyanpithkar Ravindra Kelekar Award. The Government of India awarded him the fourth highest civilian honour of the Padma Shri, in 2009, for his contributions to Literature and Education.

== See also ==
- Konkani literature
- List of translators
- Tirukkural translations into Konkani
