= Marali Mannige =

1941 novel by K. Shivaram Karanth

- Cover of the novel
- Author: K. Shivaram Karanth
- Language: Kannada
- Genre: Fiction
- Published: 1941
- Publication place: India
- Media type: Print (Hardcover & Paperback)

Marali Mannige (meaning: Back to soil) is a Kannada novel by novelist K. Shivaram Karanth.

The novel is the story of three generations spanning the period from 1850 to 1940. This book is written in the Dakshina Kannada dialect, capturing the changing face of a traditional, agrarian, caste-ridden society in the wake of its brush with ‘modernity’ and participation in the Indian freedom movement.

This novel got translated into other 10 Indian languages. The English translation of this book by Padma Ramachandra Sharma,has been conferred the State Sahitya Akademi award.
