= Swapna Saraswata =

- Swapna Saraswata
- Author: Gopalakrishna Pai
- Language: Kannada
- Genre: Non-fiction, historical
- Published: 2011 Bhagyalakshmi Prakashana, Bengaluru.
- Publication place: India
- Media type: Print (Paperback)
- ISBN: 9788190817929

Swapna Saraswata is a collection of short histories by Indian writer Gopalakrishna Pai.

== Publication ==
It was first published in the year 2009 under Bhagyalakshmi Publications, Bangalore. It consists of 474 pages. The cover page was designed by Chandranatha Acharya.

== Contents ==
The book narrates the Gaud Saraswat Brahmin (GSB) community's diaspora along the west coast of India between the early 16th Century and late 18th Century. The author put in years of research, delving into written histories and oral narrations, covering a huge time span and the social dynamics within the community in the perspective of historical events.

"Swapna Saraswata" is the story of the fall of GSB community who lived in Goa four hundred years ago. It is a tragic story of the Gowda Saraswat Brahmin community leaving their land in Goa and migrating to an unknown land due to the oppression by the Portuguese. The arrival of the Portuguese to India, the conquest of Goa by the colonists and the conversion of temples, the destruction of temples, etc., have profoundly affected the beliefs and emotions of the local Gowda Saraswat Brahmin families. In such a situation, Vittu Pai, the grandson of Narasappayya, a resident of the Verane village in Goa, vacates the village with 5-6 families in the night in order to preserve culture, faith, religion, and life. They were emotionally attached to that land and culture and it was painful for them to vacate the village. To escape from the hands of Portuguese many families travelled till Kochi, and few families settling in the places of Coastal Karnataka. Likewise, the family of Vittu Pai settles in the southern village called Bellambeedu in Kumbale. They start their new business there and settled. The novel is meant to convey a kind of message to anyone facing a storm of change by quoting the example of the life of the Gowda Saraswat Brahmin community who have seen many difficulties of survival in history.

Author mentioned that he has worked for nearly 20 years and sourced 4,000 books, manuscripts and documents for this work. He has traveled from Goa to Kochi to meet people and studied their lifestyle. He has worked for nearly five years on the draft and revised it six times.

== Awards and recognitions ==
This book won the Karnataka Sahitya Academy Award in the year 2009 and the H. Shantaram Literary Award This book won 2011's Kendra Sahitya Akademi Award for the author under the category Kannada.

== Translations ==
The book has been translated into English, Marathi, Malayalam, Hindi, Bengali and Tamil. The English translation, Swapna Saraswatha, was published by Manipal Universal Press in the year 2017 under its series - Indian Literature in Translation. Translated into English by Smt. Sumathi Shenoy, Shri. M R Rakshith, Smt. Savita Sastri, It has taken the saga of this community to larger English audience.
