= Shivaram Karanth =

Indian Kannada writer (1902-1997)

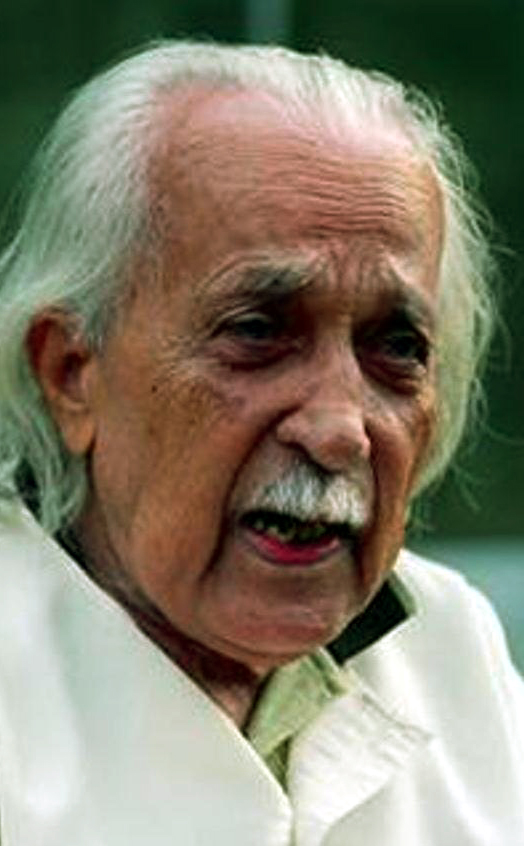
- Born: 10 October 1902; Kote, South Canara, Madras Presidency, British India (now in Udupi district, Karnataka, India)
- Died: 9 December 1997 (aged 95); Manipal, Udupi district, Karnataka, India
- Occupations: Novelist, playwright, conservationist
- Spouse: Leela Alva (m. 1936; died 1986)
- Children: 4; including Ullas
- Writing career
- Period: 1924–1997
- Genres: Fiction, popular science, literature for children, dance-drama
- Movement: Navodaya

Kota Shivaram Karanth (10 October 1902 – 9 December 1997), also abbreviated as K. Shivaram Karanth, was an Indian author, Kannada language novelist, playwright and ecological conservationist. Ramachandra Guha called him the "Rabindranath Tagore of Modern India, who has been one of the finest novelists-activists since independence". He was the third writer to be decorated with the Jnanpith Award for Kannada, the highest literary honor conferred in India. His son Ullas is an ecological conservationist.

Bust of Shivaram Karanth at Dr. Rajkumar Children Park (Jinke Park), Bengaluru (2026)

== Early life ==
Shivaram Karanth was born on 10 October 1902, in Kote, a village near Kundapura in present-day Udupi district, Karnataka to a Kannada-speaking Smartha Brahmin family. The fifth child of his parents Shesha Karantha and Lakshmamma, he completed his primary education in Kundapura and Bangalore. Shivaram Karanth was influenced by Gandhi's principles and took part in the Indian Independence movement when he was in college. His participation in the Non-cooperation movement did not allow him to complete his college education which he quit in February 1922. He canvassed for khadi and swadeshi in Karnataka led by Indian National Congress leader Karnad Sadashiva Rao, for five years till 1927. By that time, Karanth had already started writing fiction novels and plays.

== Career ==
Karanth began writing in 1924 and soon published his first book, Rashtrageetha Sudhakara, a collection of poems. His first novel was Vichitrakoota. Subsequent works like Nirbhagya Janma ("Unfortunate Birth") and Sooleya Samsara ("Family of a Prostitute") mirrored the pathetic conditions of the poor. His magnum opus Devaddhootaru, a satire on contemporary India, was published in 1928.

Karanth was an intellectual and environmentalist who made notable contribution to the art and culture of Karnataka. He is considered one of the most influential novelists in the Kannada language. His novels Marali Mannige, Bettada Jeeva, Alida Mele, Mookajjiya Kanasugalu, Mai Managala Suliyalli, Ade OOru Ade Mara, Shaneeshwarana Neralinalli, Kudiyara Koosu, Svapnada Hole, Sarsammana Samadhi, and Chomana Dudi are widely read and have received critical acclaim. He wrote two books on Karnataka's ancient stage dance-drama Yakshagana (1957 and 1975).

He was involved in experiments involving the technique of printing for some years in the 1930s and 1940s and printed his own novels, but incurred financial losses. He was also a painter and was deeply concerned with the issue of nuclear energy and its impact on the environment. At the age of 90, he wrote a book on birds (published during 2002 by Manohara Grantha Mala, Dharwad).

He wrote, apart from his forty-seven novels, thirty-one plays, four short story collections, six books of essays and sketches, thirteen books on art, two volumes of poems, nine encyclopedias, and over one hundred articles on various issues. His Mookajjiya Kanasugalu novel won Jnanpith award.

== Personal life ==
Karanth married Leela Alva, a student in the school that Karanth taught dance and directed plays in. Leela belonged to the Bunt community and was the daughter of a businessman, K. D. Alva. They married on 6 May 1936. The couple subsequently attracted ridicule from people in the region over their inter-caste marriage; Karanth belonged to an orthodox Brahmin community, but had become an atheist after cutting his sacred thread at a young age. Leela, who had her early education in Marathi language, re-learnt Kannada after marriage and translated the Marathi novel Pan Lakshat Kon Gheto into Kannada. As a dancer, she participated in Karanth's operas. The Karanths had four children together: sons, Harsha and Ullas, a conservationist; and daughters, Malavika and Kshama. His mother's influence on Karanth was described by Ullas as: "It was our mother who shaped Karanth's life... She was the backbone of all his endeavours. She was also quite well-read, and she dedicated all of her talents to her husband. She took care of all household responsibilities." The family lived in the Puttur, Karnataka town of Dakshina Kannada, a district in the South Karnataka region, before moving to Saligrama, a town 2 miles (3.2 km) from Karanth's birthplace Kota, in 1974. A few years prior to this, their eldest son Harsha died leaving Leela suffer from "depression and hallucinations". Leela died in September 1986. It was also the year that Karanth's final novel was published.

Karanth was admitted to Kasturba Medical College in Manipal on 2 December 1997 to be treated for viral fever. He suffered from a cardiac respiratory arrest two days later and slipped into a coma. On 9 December, his kidneys began to fail and he subsequently developed severe acidosis and sepsis, following which he was put on dialysis. Efforts to revive him failed and he died at 11:35 a.m. (IST) the following day, aged 95. The government of Karnataka declared a two-day mourning in the State as a mark of respect.

== Popularity ==
Many of Karanth's novels have been translated into other Indian languages. Marali Mannige got translated to English by Padma Ramachandra Sharma, has been conferred the State Sahitya Akademi award.

== Memorial ==
=== Shivarama Karantha Balavana ===
Shivarama Karantha Balavana is notable for its fame under the name of the Jnanapeeta awardee Dr. K. Shivarama Karantha, who lived in Puttur. In his memory his home now houses a museum, a park, and a recreation center.

== Literary and national honors ==
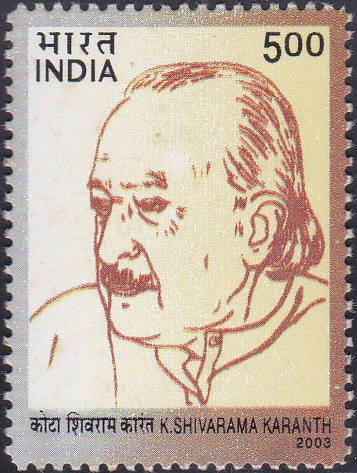
Karanth on a 2003 stamp of India

- Jnanapith Award – 1978
- Sahitya Akademi Fellowship – 1985
- Sangeet Natak Akademi Fellowship – 1973
- Padma Bhushan – 1968 (He returned his Padma Bhushan honour in protest against the Emergency imposed in India)
- Sahitya Akademi Award – 1959
- Karnataka Sahitya Academy Award
- Rajyotsava Prashasti – 1986
- Sangeet Natak Award
- Pampa Award – 1989
- Swedish Academy award
- Tulsi Samman – 1990
- Dadabhai Nauroji Award – 1990
- Honorary Doctorates from Mysore University, Meerut University, Karnatak University and others.

== Film Awards ==
- 1975 – National Film Award for Best Story Writer – Chomana Dudi
- 2010 – National Film Award – Special Jury Award / Special Mention – Bettada Jeeva

== Writings ==
Novels

- Mookajjiya Kanasugalu ("Dreams of Mookajji Granny") (Jnanpith award winning novel)
- Marali Mannige ("Back to the Soil")
- Chomana Dudi ("Drum of Choma")
- Mai Managala Suliyalli ("In the Whirlpool of Body and Soul")
- Bettada Jeeva ("Life in the Hills")
- Sarasammana Samadhi ("Grave of Sarasamma")
- Dharmarayana Samsara ("Family of Dharmaraya")
- Alida Mele ("After Death")
- Kudiyara Kusu ("Infant of Kudiya")
- Mailikallinodane Matukate ("Conversation with the Milestone")
- Chiguridha Kanasu
- Mugida Yudda ("Completed War")
- Moojanma
- Dharmarayana Samsara
- Kevala Manushyaru
- Illeyamba
- Iddaru Chinthe
- Navu Kattida Swarga
- Nashta Diggajagalu
- Kanniddu Kanaru
- Gedda Doddasthike
- Kannadiyalli Kandatha
- Antida Aparanji
- Halliya Hattu Samastharu
- Sameekshe
- Moga Padeda Mana
- Shaneeshwarana Neralinalli
- Nambidavara Naka Naraka
- Oudaryada Urulalli
- Onti Dani
- Odahuttidavaru
- Swapnada Hole
- Jaruva Dariyalli
- Ukkida Nore
- Balveye Belaku
- Ala Nirala
- Gondaranya
- Ade Uru Ade Mara
- Innonde Dari
- Jagadoddara Na
- Bathada Thore

Science Books

- Nature, Science and Environment
- Vijnana prapancha ("The World of Science")
- Adbhuta jagattu ("Wonderful World")
- Prani Prapancha
- Prani Prapanchada Vismayagalu
- Pakshigala Adbhuta Loka

Plays

- Yaksagana – English translation, Indira Gandhi National Center for the Arts (1997)
- Yakshagana Bayalata

Children's books

- Dum Dum Dolu
- Oduva Ata
- Vishala Sagaragalu
- Balaprapancha – Makkalavishwakosha – Vol 1,2,3
- Mailikallinodane Matukathegalu
- Mariyappana Sahasagalu
- Nachiketa – Ack
- Ibbara Gaja Panditaru
- Oduva Ata – Sirigannada Pathamale
- Mathina Sethuve
- Jatayu Hanumanta
- Huliraya

Autobiography

- Hucchu Manasina Hatthu Mukhagalu (English translation: "Ten Faces of a Crazy Mind", by H Y Sharada Prasad)
- Smriti Pataladinda (Vol 1–3)

Travelogue

- Abuvinda Baramakke
- Arasikaralla
- Apoorva Paschima ("Incomparable West")
- Paataalakke Payana ("Travel to the nether world")

Biography

- Panje Mangesharayaru : Kannada Nadu Mattu Kannadigara Parampare
- Sri Ramakrishnara Jeevana Charithre

Art, Architecture and Other

- Kaladarshana
- Bharatheya Chitrakale
- Jnana ("Knowledge")
- Sirigannada Artha Kosha
- Kala Prapancha
- Yaksharangakkagi Pravasa
- Arivina Ananda
- Life The Only Light – A Guide To Saner Living
- Chalukya Shilpakale

Translations

- NammaSuttalina Kadalu - translation of Rachel Carsons The Sea Around Us

== Filmography ==
- Note: all films are in Kannada, unless otherwise noted.
- Chomana Dudi
- Maleya Makkalu (from Kudiyara Koosu Novel)
- September 8 (Tulu)
- Chigurida Kanasu
- Bettada Jeeva
- Mookajjiya Kanasugalu

== See also ==
- Kannada
- Kannada literature
- Yakshagana.
- Kuvempu
