= Sahitya Akademi Translation Prize =

- Prize for Translation
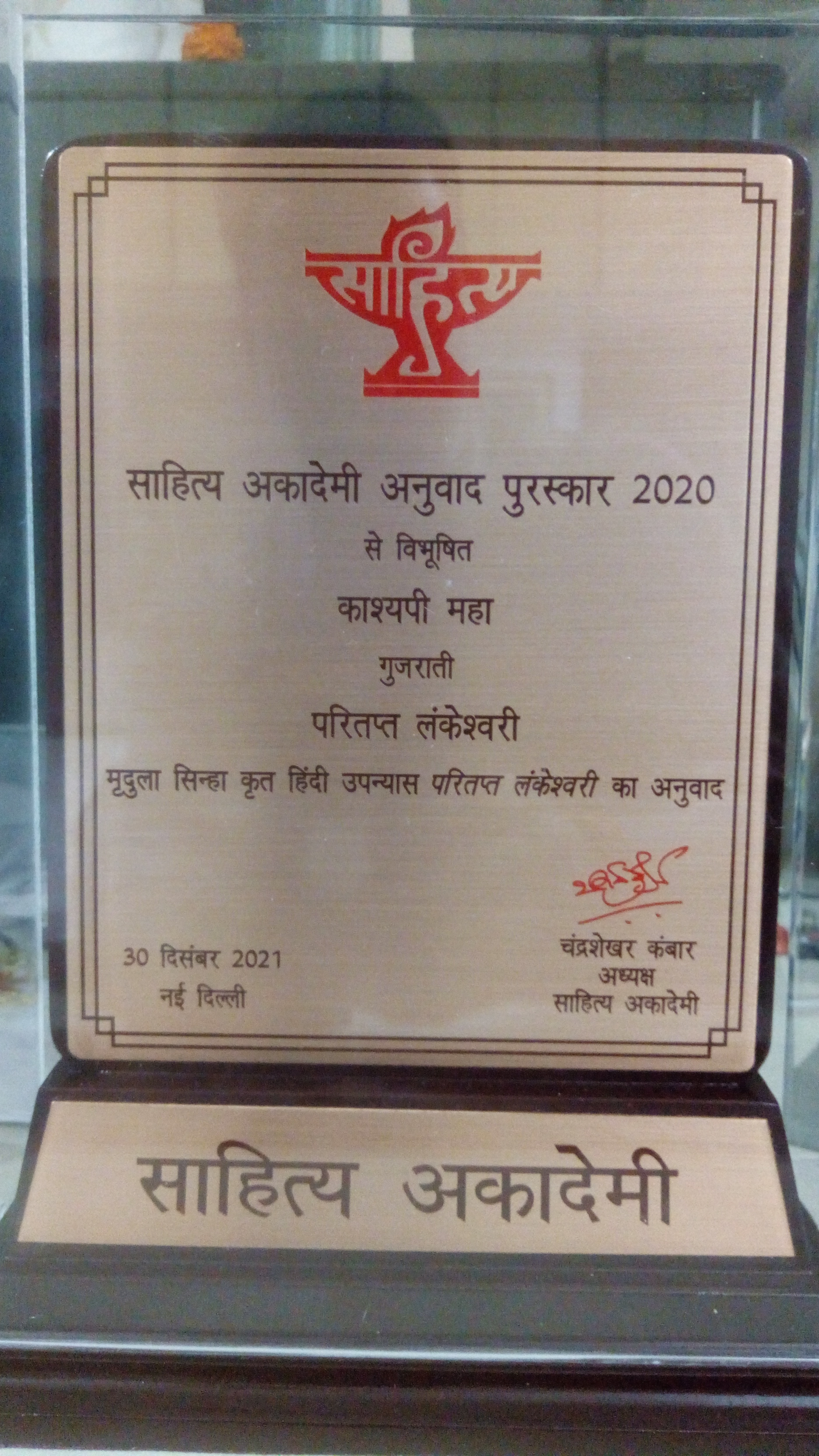
- Awarded for: Literary award in India
- Sponsored by: Sahitya Akademi, Government of India
- Reward: ₹ 50,000
- First award: 1989
- Final award: 2021
- Website: Official Website

Part of a series on

Sahitya Akademi Awards
Category
Sahitya Akademi Award winners by language
- Assamese
- Bengali
- Bodo
- Dogri
- English
- Gujarati
- Hindi
- Kannada
- Kashmiri
- Konkani
- Maithili
- Malayalam
- Marathi
- Meitei (Manipuri)
- Nepali
- Odia
- Punjabi
- Rajasthani
- Sanskrit
- Santali
- Sindhi
- Tamil
- Telugu
- Urdu
Sahitya Akademi Translation Prizes
- Assamese
- Bengali
- Bodo
- Dogri
- English
- Gujarati
- Hindi
- Kannada
- Kashmiri
- Konkani
- Maithili
- Malayalam
- Marathi
- Meitei (Manipuri)
- Nepali
- Odia
- Punjabi
- Rajasthani
- Sanskrit
- Santali
- Sindhi
- Tamil
- Telugu
- Urdu
Sahitya Akademi Yuva Puraskar
- Assamese
- Bengali
- Bodo
- Dogri
- English
- Gujarati
- Hindi
- Kannada
- Kashmiri
- Konkani
- Maithili
- Malayalam
- Meitei (Manipuri)
- Marathi
- Nepali
- Odia
- Punjabi
- Rajasthani
- Sanskrit
- Santali
- Sindhi
- Tamil
- Telugu
- Urdu
Sahitya Akademi Bal Sahitya Puraskar
- Assamese
- Bengali
- Bodo
- Dogri
- English
- Gujarati
- Hindi
- Kannada
- Kashmiri
- Konkani
- Maithili
- Malayalam
- Meitei (Manipuri)
- Marathi
- Nepali
- Odia
- Punjabi
- Rajasthani
- Sanskrit
- Santali
- Sindhi
- Tamil
- Telugu
- Urdu
Related
- Eighth Schedule to the Constitution of India
- Official Languages Commission
- List of languages by number of native speakers in India

Sahitya Akademi Translation Prize or Sahitya Akademi Prize for Translation is a literary honour in India, presented by Sahitya Akademi, India's National Academy of Letters, given to "outstanding translations of creative and critical works" in 24 major Indian languages such as English, Rajasthani and the 22 listed languages in the Eighth Schedule of the Indian Constitution recognised by the Sahitya Akademi, New Delhi.

The award, established in 1989, comprises a plaque and a cash prize of ₹ 50,000. Krishnamohan was the youngest translator to win the prize aged 32 in Hindi and Kalachand Shastri is the oldest to win the prize aged 89 in Manipuri.

== Background ==
Awards for translations were instituted in 1989 at the instance of then-Prime Minister of India, P. V. Narasimha Rao. The initial proposal for translation prizes contained provisions for a prize for translations into each of the twenty-two languages recognised by the Akademi; however, this was soon found to be unviable for several reasons: Akademi found insufficient entries in all the languages and difficulties in locating experts knowledgeable in both, the source and the target language to judge the translations. Consequently, the Board decided to dispense with its original requirement for additional expert committees to evaluate the translations, and also ruled that it was not obligated to grant prizes in languages where suitable books were not nominated. The Akademi also requires that both, the original author as well as the translator, are to be Indian nationals.

Over time, the Akademi has modified and expanded the conditions for the Translation Prizes. In 1992, the Akademi began to allow translations made in link languages to be eligible for the Awards, although it noted that translations made directly from the original language would always be preferred. In 1995, the Akademi also held that joint translations would be eligible, and in 1997, it dispensed with the process of advertising for nominations and replaced it with invitations for recommendations from advisory boards and Committee members. As of 2002, 264 prizes have been awarded to 266 translators.

Initially, the prize money was ₹10,000 which was increased to ₹15,000 in 2001. From 2003 it was increased to ₹20,000 and is now ₹50,000 from 2009.

== Rules and selection process ==
Entries for the prizes are invited from individual translator or publishers through advertise in newspapers. Members of the advisory boards are also invited to send nominations from the different languages. Minimum five entries from each language are mandatory for a prize to be awarded. Expert committee for each language consist of three members scrutinise all the nominations and send the copy of shortlisted books to the expert who knows both the source and the target languages. Opinion of the expert forwarded to the executive board and board will consider the recommendation and award the prizes.

The executive board members and the prior winners are not entitle for the award. Translations from the original languages are preferred than link languages. joint venture is also eligible however award amount equally divided between the translators.

== Recipients ==
- List of Sahitya Akademi Translation Prize winners for Assamese
- List of Sahitya Akademi Translation Prize winners for Bengali
- List of Sahitya Akademi Translation Prize winners for Bodo
- List of Sahitya Akademi Translation Prize winners for Dogri
- List of Sahitya Akademi Translation Prize winners for English
- List of Sahitya Akademi Translation Prize winners for Gujarati
- List of Sahitya Akademi Translation Prize winners for Hindi
- List of Sahitya Akademi Translation Prize winners for Kannada
- List of Sahitya Akademi Translation Prize winners for Kashmiri
- List of Sahitya Akademi Translation Prize winners for Konkani
- List of Sahitya Akademi Translation Prize winners for Maithili
- List of Sahitya Akademi Translation Prize winners for Malayalam
- List of Sahitya Akademi Translation Prize winners for Manipuri
- List of Sahitya Akademi Translation Prize winners for Marathi
- List of Sahitya Akademi Translation Prize winners for Nepali
- List of Sahitya Akademi Translation Prize winners for Odia
- List of Sahitya Akademi Translation Prize winners for Punjabi
- List of Sahitya Akademi Translation Prize winners for Rajasthani
- List of Sahitya Akademi Translation Prize winners for Sanskrit
- List of Sahitya Akademi Translation Prize winners for Santali
- List of Sahitya Akademi Translation Prize winners for Sindhi
- List of Sahitya Akademi Translation Prize winners for Tamil
- List of Sahitya Akademi Translation Prize winners for Telugu
- List of Sahitya Akademi Translation Prize winners for Urdu

== See also ==
- Sahitya Akademi Award
- List of literary awards
