= List of Sahitya Akademi Award winners for English =

List of winners of a literary honor in India

Sahitya Akademi Award for English
- Award for contributions to English literature
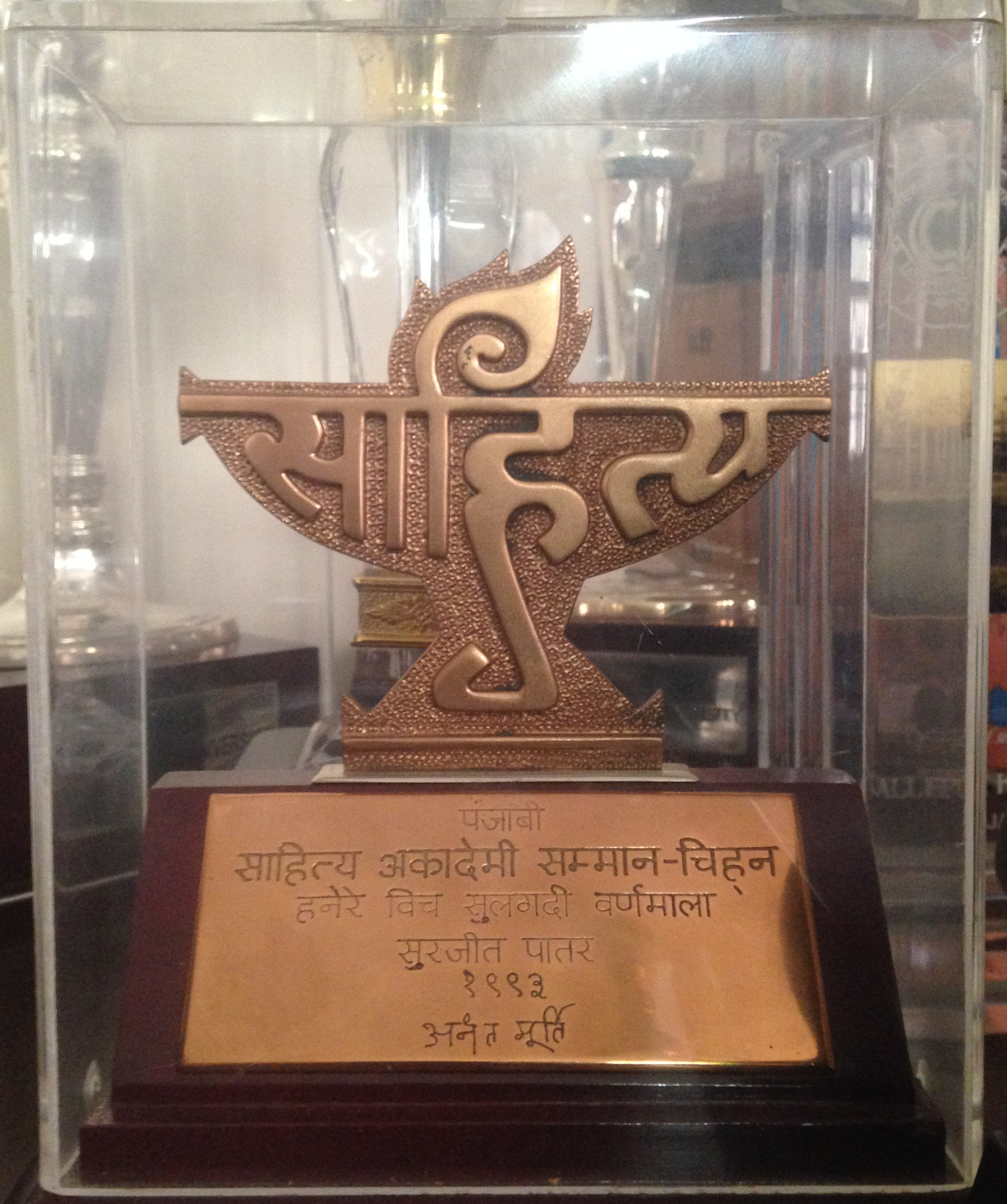
- Awarded for: Literary award in India
- Sponsored by: Sahitya Akademi, Government of India
- Reward: ₹1 lakh (US$1,100)
- First award: 1960
- Final award: 2024

Highlights
- Total awarded: 53
- First winner: R. K. Narayan
- Most Recent winner: Easterine Kire
- Website: sahitya-akademi.gov.in

Part of a series on

Sahitya Akademi Awards
Category
Sahitya Akademi Award winners by language
- Assamese
- Bengali
- Bodo
- Dogri
- English
- Gujarati
- Hindi
- Kannada
- Kashmiri
- Konkani
- Maithili
- Malayalam
- Marathi
- Meitei (Manipuri)
- Nepali
- Odia
- Punjabi
- Rajasthani
- Sanskrit
- Santali
- Sindhi
- Tamil
- Telugu
- Urdu
Sahitya Akademi Translation Prizes
- Assamese
- Bengali
- Bodo
- Dogri
- English
- Gujarati
- Hindi
- Kannada
- Kashmiri
- Konkani
- Maithili
- Malayalam
- Marathi
- Meitei (Manipuri)
- Nepali
- Odia
- Punjabi
- Rajasthani
- Sanskrit
- Santali
- Sindhi
- Tamil
- Telugu
- Urdu
Sahitya Akademi Yuva Puraskar
- Assamese
- Bengali
- Bodo
- Dogri
- English
- Gujarati
- Hindi
- Kannada
- Kashmiri
- Konkani
- Maithili
- Malayalam
- Meitei (Manipuri)
- Marathi
- Nepali
- Odia
- Punjabi
- Rajasthani
- Sanskrit
- Santali
- Sindhi
- Tamil
- Telugu
- Urdu
Sahitya Akademi Bal Sahitya Puraskar
- Assamese
- Bengali
- Bodo
- Dogri
- English
- Gujarati
- Hindi
- Kannada
- Kashmiri
- Konkani
- Maithili
- Malayalam
- Meitei (Manipuri)
- Marathi
- Nepali
- Odia
- Punjabi
- Rajasthani
- Sanskrit
- Santali
- Sindhi
- Tamil
- Telugu
- Urdu
Related
- Eighth Schedule to the Constitution of India
- Official Languages Commission
- List of languages by number of native speakers in India

The Sahitya Akademi Award is a literary honor in India awarded by the Sahitya Akademi, India's National Academy of Letters, which aims at "promoting Indian literature throughout the world". The Akademi annually confers the award on writers of "the most outstanding books of literary merit". The awards are given for works published in any of the 24 languages recognised by the akademi. Instituted in 1954, the award recognizes and promotes excellence in writing and acknowledge new trends. The annual process of selecting awardees runs for the preceding twelve months. As of 2024, the award consists of an engraved copper-plaque, a shawl and a cash prize of ₹1 lakh (US$1,100).

== Recipients ==
Year	Book	Writer	Image	Category of Books	Ref.
1960	The Guide	R. K. Narayan		Novel	
1964	The Serpent and the Rope	Raja Rao		Novel	
1965	The Tribal World of Verrier Elwin	Verrier Elwin		Autobiography	
1967	Shadow From Ladakh	Bhabani Bhattacharya		Novel	
1969	An Artist in Life	Niharranjan Ray		Biography	
1971	Morning Face	Mulk Raj Anand		Novel	
1975	Scholar Extraordinary	Nirad C. Chaudhuri		Biography	
1976	Jawaharlal Nehru	Sarvepalli Gopal		Biography	
1977	Azadi	Chaman Nahal		Novel	
1978	Fire on the Mountain	Anita Desai		Novel	
1979	Inside the Haveli	Rama Mehta		Novel	
1980	On the Mother	K. R. Srinivasa Iyengar		Biography	
1981	Relationship	Jayanta Mahapatra		Poetry	
1982	The Last Labyrinth	Arun Joshi		Novel	
1983	Latter-Day Psalms	Nissim Ezekiel		Poetry	
1984	The Keeper of the Dead	Keki N. Daruwalla		Poetry	
1985	Collected Poems	Kamala Das		Poetry	
1986	Rich Like Us	Nayantara Sahgal		Novel	
1987	Trapfalls In the Sky	Shiv K. Kumar		Poetry	
1988	The Golden Gate	Vikram Seth		Novel	
1989	The Shadow Lines	Amitav Ghosh		Novel	
1990	That Long Silence	Shashi Deshpande		Novel	
1991	The Trotter-Nama	Allan Sealy		Novel	
1992	Our Trees Still Grow in Dehra	Ruskin Bond		Novel	
1993	After Amnesia	G. N. Devy		Essays	
1994	Serendip	Dom Moraes		Poetry	
1996	Memories of Rain	Sunetra Gupta		Novel	
1998	Final Solutions and Other Plays	Mahesh Dattani		Drama	
1999	The Collected Poems	A. K. Ramanujan		Poetry	
2000	Cuckold	Kiran Nagarkar		Novel	
2001	Rajaji: A Life	Rajmohan Gandhi		Biography	
2002	A New World	Amit Chaudhuri		Novel	
2003	The Perishable Empire	Meenakshi Mukherjee		Essays	
2004	The Mammaries of the Welfare State	Upamanyu Chatterjee		Novel	
2005	The Algebra of Infinite Justice	Arundhati Roy		Essays	
2006	The Sari Shop	Rupa Bajwa		Novel	
2007	Disorderly Women	Malathi Rao		Novel	
2009	Mahabharata: An Inquiry into the Human Condition	Chaturvedi Badrinath		Criticism	
2010	The Book of Rachel	Esther David		Novel	
2011	India after Gandhi	Ramachandra Guha		Historical Narrative	
2012	These Errors are Correct	Jeet Thayil		Poetry	
2013	Laburnum For My Head	Temsula Ao		Short stories	
2014	Trying to Say Goodbye	Adil Jussawalla		Poetry	
2015	Chronicle of a Corpse Bearer	Cyrus Mistry		Novel	
2016	Em and the Big Hoom	Jerry Pinto		Novel	
2017	The Black Hill	Mamang Dai		Novel	
2018	The Blind Lady's Descendants	Anees Salim		Novel	
2019	An Era of Darkness	Shashi Tharoor		Novel (non-fiction)	
2020	When God is a Traveller	Arundhathi Subramaniam		Poetry	
2021	Things to Leave Behind	Namita Gokhale		Novel	
2022	All the Lives We Never Lived	Anuradha Roy		Novel	
2023	Requiem in Raga Janaki	Neelam Gour		Novel	
2024	Spirit Nights	Easterine Kire		Novel	
2025	Crimson Spring	Navtej Sarna		Novel (non-fiction)	
