= List of Sahitya Akademi Award winners for Bengali =

List of winners of a literary honor in India

Sahitya Akademi Award for Bengali
- Award for contributions to Bengali literature
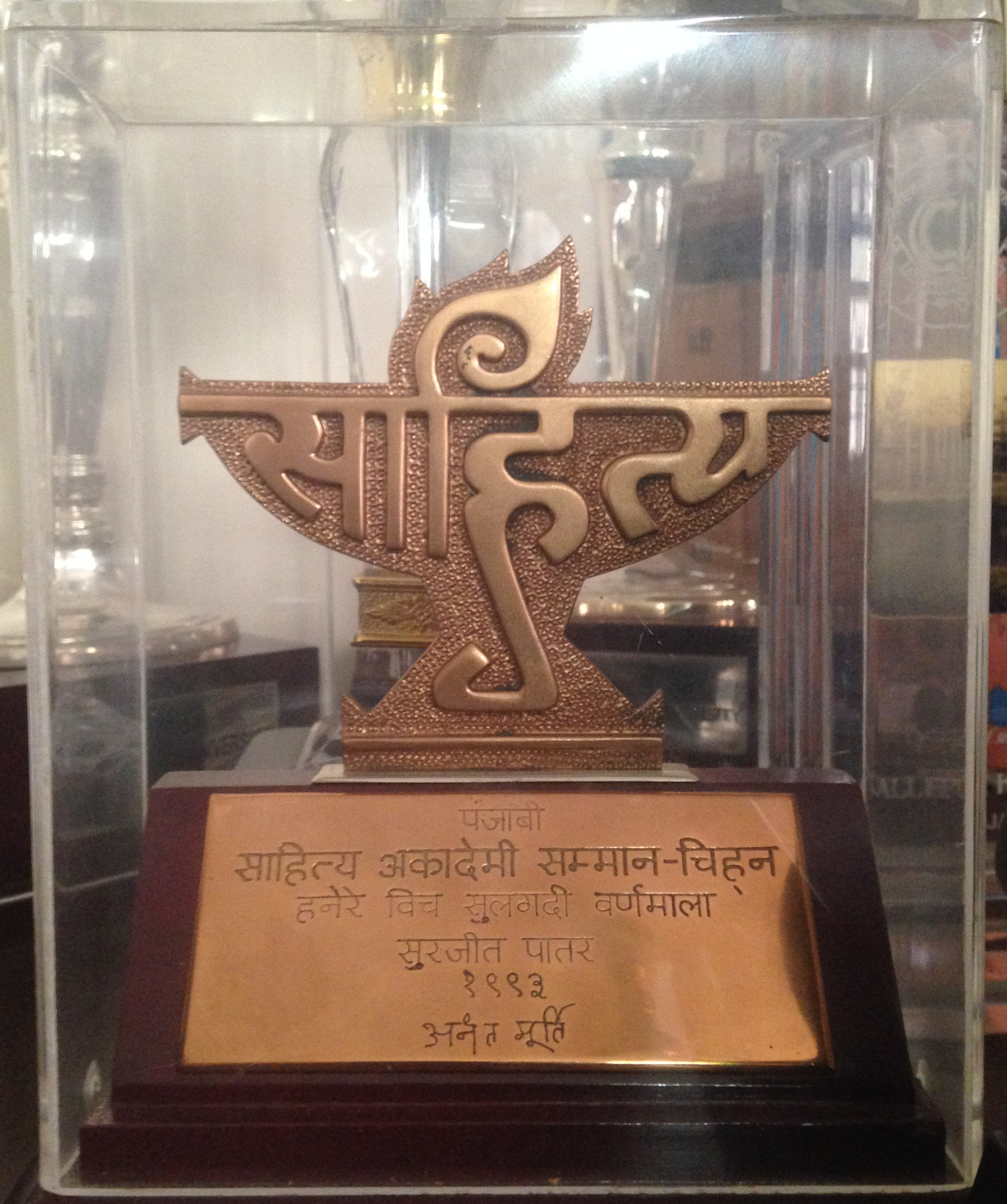
- Awarded for: Literary award in India
- Sponsored by: Sahitya Akademi, Government of India
- Reward: ₹1 lakh (US$1,100)
- First award: 1955
- Final award: 2023

Highlights
- Total awarded: 66
- First winner: Jibanananda Das
- Most Recent winner: Swapnamoy Chakraborty
- Website: Official website

Part of a series on

Sahitya Akademi Awards
Category
Sahitya Akademi Award winners by language
- Assamese
- Bengali
- Bodo
- Dogri
- English
- Gujarati
- Hindi
- Kannada
- Kashmiri
- Konkani
- Maithili
- Malayalam
- Marathi
- Meitei (Manipuri)
- Nepali
- Odia
- Punjabi
- Rajasthani
- Sanskrit
- Santali
- Sindhi
- Tamil
- Telugu
- Urdu
Sahitya Akademi Translation Prizes
- Assamese
- Bengali
- Bodo
- Dogri
- English
- Gujarati
- Hindi
- Kannada
- Kashmiri
- Konkani
- Maithili
- Malayalam
- Marathi
- Meitei (Manipuri)
- Nepali
- Odia
- Punjabi
- Rajasthani
- Sanskrit
- Santali
- Sindhi
- Tamil
- Telugu
- Urdu
Sahitya Akademi Yuva Puraskar
- Assamese
- Bengali
- Bodo
- Dogri
- English
- Gujarati
- Hindi
- Kannada
- Kashmiri
- Konkani
- Maithili
- Malayalam
- Meitei (Manipuri)
- Marathi
- Nepali
- Odia
- Punjabi
- Rajasthani
- Sanskrit
- Santali
- Sindhi
- Tamil
- Telugu
- Urdu
Sahitya Akademi Bal Sahitya Puraskar
- Assamese
- Bengali
- Bodo
- Dogri
- English
- Gujarati
- Hindi
- Kannada
- Kashmiri
- Konkani
- Maithili
- Malayalam
- Meitei (Manipuri)
- Marathi
- Nepali
- Odia
- Punjabi
- Rajasthani
- Sanskrit
- Santali
- Sindhi
- Tamil
- Telugu
- Urdu
Related
- Eighth Schedule to the Constitution of India
- Official Languages Commission
- List of languages by number of native speakers in India

Sahitya Akademi Award is given by the Sahitya Akademi, India's national academy of letters, to one writer every year in each of the languages recognized by it as well as for translations. This is the second highest literary award of India, after Jnanpith Award. The award has been given to Bengali writers for works in Bengali and English as well as for translations from Bengali literature are given below.

== Sahitya Akademi Award winners ==
Following is the list of Akademi Award winners. No awards were conferred in 1960, 1968 and 1973.

Year	Book	Portrait	Author	Category of Books
1955	Shreshtha Kavita		Jibanananda Das	Poetry
1956	Arogya Niketan		Tarashankar Bandopadhyay	Novel
1957	Sagar Theke Phera	—	Premendra Mitra	Poetry
1958	Anandibai Ityadi Galpa	—	Parashuram	Short Stories
1959	Kolkatar Kachhei	—	Gajendra Kumar Mitra	Novel
1961	Bharater Sakti-Sadhana O Sakta Sahitya	—	Sashi Bhushan Dasgupta	A Study of the Shakta-sect
1962	Japane	—	Annada Shankar Ray	Travelogue
1963	Ghare Pherar Din	—	Amiya Chakravarty	Poetry
1964	Jato Durei Jai	—	Subhas Mukhopadhyay	Poetry
1965	Smriti Satta Bhabishyat	—	Bishnu Dey	Poetry
1966	Nishi-Kutumba	—	Manoj Basu	Novel
1967	Tapasvi O Tarangini		Buddhadeb Basu	Verse play
1969	Mohini Aaraal	—	Manindra Ray	Poetry
1970	Adhunikata O Rabindranath		Abu Sayeed Ayyub	Literary criticism
1971	Manimahesh	—	Umaprasad Mukhopadhyay	Travelogue
1972	Shesh Namaskar		Santosh Kumar Ghosh	Novel
1974	Ulanga Raja		Nirendranath Chakravarty	Poetry
1975	Asamay	—	Bimal Kar	Novel
1976	Na Hanyate	—	Maitreyi Devi	Novel
1977	Babarer Prarthana		Shankha Ghosh	Poetry
1978	Vivekananda O Samakalin Bharatvarsha, Vol. I, II and III	—	Sankari Prasad Basu	Biography and cultural history
1979	Aranyer Adhikar		Mahashweta Devi	Novel
1980	Shambo	—	Samaresh Basu "Kalkut"	Novel
1981	Kolikata Darpan, Pt. I		Radharaman Mitra	Local history and culture
1982	Amritasya Putree	—	Kamal Das	Novel
1983	Jete Pari Kintu Keno Jabo	—	Shakti Chattopadhyay	Poetry
1984	Kalbela		Samaresh Majumdar	Novel
1985	Sei Samay (Part II)		Sunil Gangopadhyay	Novel
1986	Raj Nagar		Amiya Bhushan Majumdar	Novel
1987	Khujte Khujte Eto Dur	—	Arun Mitra	Poetry
1988	Bari Badle Jai		Ramapada Chowdhury	Novel
1989	Manabjamin		Shirshendu Mukhopadhyay	Novel
1990	Tista Parer Brittanto	—	Debesh Roy	Novel
1991	Sada Kham	—	Moti Nandi	Novel
1992	Marami Karat	—	Alok Ranjan Dasgupta	Poetry
1993	Shahjada Darasukoh	—	Shyamal Gangapadhyay	Novel
1994	Aleek Manush		Syed Mustafa Siraj	Novel
1995	Kavita Sangraha	—	Naresh Guha	Poetry
1996	Tal Betal	—	Ashok Mitra	Essays
1997	Herbert		Nabarun Bhattacharya	Novel
1998	Anubhav	—	Dibyendu Palit	Novel
1999	Naba-Nita		Nabaneeta Dev Sen	Prose-Poetry
2000	Pagli Tomar Sange		Joy Goswami	Poetry
2001	Panchashati Galpo		Atin Bandyopadhyay	Short Stories
2002	Ami O Banabehari	—	Sandipan Chattopadhyay	Novel
2003	Krantikal		Prafulla Roy	Novel
2004	Baul Fakir Katha		Sudhir Chakravarti	Essay
2005	Haspatale Lekha Kabitaguchha	—	Binay Majumdar	Poetry
2006	Dhrubaputra		Amar Mitra	Novel
2007	Amar Samay Alpa	—	Amarendra Sengupta	Poetry
2008	Ghumer Borir Mato Chand	—	Sarat Kumar Mukhopadhyay	Poetry
2009	Keno Amra Rabindranathke Chai Ebong Kibhabe	—	Sourin Bhattacharya	Essay
2010	Khanamihirer Dhipi		Bani Basu	Novel
2011	Bane Aaj Concherto	—	Manindra Gupta	Poetry
2012	Birasan	—	Subrata Mukhopadhyaya	Novel
2013	Dwaipayan Hrader Dhare		Subodh Sarkar	Poetry
2014	Piya Man Bhabe	—	Utpal Kumar Basu	Poetry
2015	Shono Jabaphul	—	Alok Sarkar	Poetry
2016	Mahabharater Astadashi		Nrisingha Prasad Bhaduri	Essays
2017	Sei Nikhonj Manusta	—	Afsar Amed	Novel
2018	Srikrishner Sesh Kata Din		Sanjib Chattopadhyay	Novel
2019	Ghumer Darja Thele		Chinmoy Guha	Essays
2020	Eka Eka Ekashi		Shankar	Memoirs
2021	Mirzaffar O Onnano Natok		Bratya Basu	Collection of Plays
2022	Birbal		Tapan Bandyopadhyay	Novel
2023	Jaler Opor Pani		Swapnamoy Chakraborty	Novel
2025	Shrestha Kabita	—	Prasun Bandyopadhyay	Poetry

== Sahitya Akademi Bal Sahitya Puraskar winners ==
Year	Book	Author	Category of Books
2010	Total contribution to Children's literature	Saral Dey	-
2011	Total contribution to Children's literature	Sailen Ghosh	-
2012	Bhaluker Dolna	Balaram Basak	Collection of short-stories
2013	Narayan Debnath Comics Samagra	Narayan Debnath	Collection of Comics creations
2014	Total contribution to Children's literature	Gouri Dharmapal	-
2015	Total contribution to Children's literature	Kartik Ghosh	-
2016	Gorillar Chokh	Amarendra Chakravorty	Novelette
2017	Total contribution to Children's literature	Sasthipada Chattopadhyay	-
2018	Total contribution to Children's literature	Shirshendu Mukhopadhyay	-
2019	Total contribution to Children's literature	Nabaneeta Dev Sen	-
2020	Gopon Bakso Khulte Nei	Pracheta Gupta	Short-story
2021	Batakesto Babur Chhata	Sunirmal Chakraborty	Collection of short-stories
2022	Char Panch Jon Bondhu	Joya Mitra	Collection of short-stories

== Sahitya Akademi Youth Award winners ==
Year	Book	Author	Category of Books
2013	Bouddho Lekhomala O Onyanyo Shraman	Subhro Bandopadhyay	Poetry
2017	Elvis O Amolasundari	Shamik Ghosh	Short Story

== Bengali winners of Sahitya Akademi Award for English ==
Year	Book	Author	Category of Books
1967	Shadow from Ladakh	Bhabani Bhattacharya	Novel
1969	An Artist in Life	Niharranjan Ray	Study of Tagore
1975	Scholar Extraordinary	Nirad C. Chaudhuri	Biography of Max Müller
1989	The Shadow Lines	Amitav Ghosh	Novel
1996	Memories of Rain	Sunetra Gupta	Novel
2002	A New World	Amit Chaudhuri	Novel
2003	The Perishable Empire	Meenakshi Mukherjee	Essays
2004	The Mammaries of the Welfare State	Upamanyu Chattopadhyay	Novel

== Translations from Bengali literature ==
- 1989 – Nagindas Parekh – Na Hanyate (novel, Gujarati tr. from Maitreyi Devi),
- ... ... K. Ravi Verma – Ganadevata (novel, Malayalam tr. from Tarashankar Bandyopadhyay),
- ... ... T.Thoibi Devi – Drishtipat (novel, Manipuri tr. from Yayavar),
- ... ... Basanta Kumari Devi – Ganadebata, Parts I and II (Panchagram) (novel, Oriya tr. from Tarashankar Bandyopadhyay),
- ... ... B. Gopala Reddi – Ravindruni Natikalu (plays, Telugu tr. from Rabindranath Thakur)
- 1990 – Ramanik Meghanee – Gandevata (novel, Gujarati tr. from Tarashankar Bandyopadhyay),
- ... ... Upendranath Jha 'Vyas' – Vipradas (novel, Maithili tr. from Sharat Chandra Chattopadhyay),
- ... ... A. Shyamsundar Singh – Krishnakantagee Uil (novel, Manipuri tr. from Bankim Chandra Chattopadhyay),
- ... ... Amar Bharati – Ikki Kahaniyan (short stories, Punjabi tr. from Rabindranath Thakur),
- ... ... Laxmi Narayan Mohanty – Banachari (novel, Oriya tr. from Bibhuti Bhushan Bandyopadhyay),
- ... ... Biharilal Chhabria - Sat Kadam (Two Parts) (novel, Sindhi tr. from Tarashankar Bandyopadhyay)
- 1991 – Ramanlal Soni – Kabuliwala (short stories, Gujarati tr. from Rabindranath Thakur),
- 1991 – Shanti Ranjan Bhattacharya – Gulshan-e-Sehat (novel, Urdu tr. from Tarashankar Bandyopadhyay)
- 1993 – Anila A. Dalal – Prachchhanna (novel, Gujarati tr. from Bimal Kar),
- ... ... Olivinho Gomes – Anandmath (novel, Konkani tr. from Bankim Chandra Chattopadhyay),
- ... ... Leela Sarkar – Aranyathinte Adhikaaram (novel, Malayalam tr. from Mahashweta Devi),
- ... ... L. Raghumani Sharma – Charitraheen (novel, Manipuri tr. from Sharat Chandra Chattopadhyay),
- ... ... Barendra Krushna Dhal – Samba (novel, Oriya tr. from Samaresh Basu),
- ... ... Vilas Gite – Rabindranathanchya Sahavasat (poetry, Marathi tr. from Maitreyi Devi),
- ... ... Maddipattla Suri – Samayam Kani Samayam (novel, Telugu tr. from Bimal Kar)
- 1994 – Basundhara Saikia –Datta (novel, Assamese tr. from Sharat Chandra Chattopadhyay),
- ... ... Karna Thami – Sukanta Ka Kavitaharu (poetry, Nepali tr. from Sukanta Bhattacharya)
- 1995 – Kulanath Gogoi – Aranyer Adhikar (novel, Assamese tr. from Mahashweta Devi),
- ... ... Surendra Jha 'Suman' – Rabindra Natakavali Vol. I (plays, Maithili tr. from Rabindranath Thakur),
- ... ... P. Bhanumanthi – Meethi Charithram (play, Tamil tr. from Badal Sarkar)
- 1996 – Aruna Chakrabarti – Srikanta (novel, English tr. from Sharat Chandra Chattopadhyay),
- ... ... Chandrakant Mehta – Jeevan Swad (novel, Gujarati tr. from Ashapurna Devi)
- 1997 – Gayatri Chakrabarti Spivak – Imaginary Maps (short stories, English tr. from Mahashweta Devi),
- ... ... Prasad Brahmbhatt – Amritasya Putri (novel, Gujarati tr. from Kamal Das),
- ... ... Shiva Shamsher Rasaily – Biraj Dulahi (novel, Nepali tr. from Sharat Chandra Chattopadhyay),
- ... ... Jugal Kishor Dutta – Asami Hazir (novel, Oriya tr. from Bimal Mitra)
- 1998 – Kalpana Bardhan – Wives and Others (short stories & a novel, English tr. from Manik Bandyopadhyay),
- ... ... Chandranath Mishra 'Amar' – Parashuramak Beechhal - Berayal Katha (short stories, Maithili tr. from Parashuram),
- ... ... Bihari Lal Mishra – Sharatsaptakam (short stories, Sanskrit tr. from Sharat Chandra Chattopadhyay),
- ... ... Lakhmi Khilani – Asamaya (novel, Sindhi tr. from Bimal Kar)
- 1999 – Suknaya Jhaveri – Ekvis Bengali Vartao (short stories, Gujarati tr. from different authors),
- ... ... Murari Madhusudan Thakur – Arogya Niketan (novel, Maithili tr. from Tarashankar Bandyopadhyay)
- 2000 – Hans Raj Pandotra – Gosain De Bagha Da Bhoot (novel, Dogri tr. from Shirshendu Mukhopadhyay),
- ... ... Amresh Patnaik – Tista Tatora Brutanta (novel, Oriya tr. from Debesh Ray),
- ... ... Dipak Ghosh – Sanskritaravindrasangitam (songs, Sanskrit tr. from Rabindranath Thakur)
- 2001 – Gopa Majumdar –Aparajito (novel, English tr. from Bibhuti Bhushan Bandyopadhyay),
- ... ... Janaki Ballav Patnaik – Bankima Upanyasmala (2 Volumes) (novels, Oriya tr. from Bankim Chandra Chattopadhyay)
- 2003 – (Lt.) Sujit Mukhopadhyay – Gora (novel, English tr. from Rabindranath Thakur),
- ... ... Rajen Saikia – Putul Nachar Itikat (novel, Assamese tr. from Manik Bandyopadhyay),
- ... ... M.P. Kumaran – Heerak Deepti (novel, Malayalam tr. from Sunil Gangopadhyay),
- ... ... Ram Swaroop Kisan – Rati Kaner (play, Rajasthani tr. from Rabindranath Thakur)
- 2004 – Ramshankar Dwivedi – Jhansi Ki Rani (novel, Hindi tr. from Mahashweta Devi),
- ... ... Madhav Borcar – Ekshe Ek Kavita (poetry, Konkani tr. from Rabindranath Thakur),
- ... ... Nongthombam Kunjamohan Singh – Gora (novel, Manipuri tr. from Rabindranath Thakur),
- ... ... Mrinalini Prabhakar Gadkari – Devdas (novel, Marathi tr. from Sharat Chandra Chattopadhyay)
- 2005 – Uma Randeria – Nava Yugnu Parodh (novel, Gujarati tr. from Sunil Gangopadhyay)
- 2006 – Rajnand Jha – Kaalbela (novel, Maithili tr. from Samaresh Majumdar)
- ... ... Puviarasu – Puratchikaaran (poetry, Tamil tr. from Kazi Nazrul Islam)
- 2007 – Bachchan Singh – Mahabharat ki Katha (treatise, Hindi tr. from Buddhadeb Basu)
- 2009 – Jatindra Kumar Bargohain – Lokayata Darshan (philosophy, Assamese tr. from Devi Prasad Chattopadhyay)
- ... ... .Kasturi Desai – Adhikar Aranyacho (novel, Konkani tr. from Mahashweta Devi)
- ... ... .Bhuvana Natarajan – Mudhal Sabadam (novel, Tamil tr. from Ashapoorna Devi)
- 2010 – Tarapati Upadhyay – Anand Math (novel, Nepali tr. from Bankim Chandra Chattopadhyay)
- 2012 – Swarna Prabha Chainary – Nwizise Sungdo Solo (short stories, Bodo tr. from Rabindranath Thakur)
- ... ... .Anand – Kavi Bandya Ghatigayiyute Jeevithavum Maranavum (novel, Malayalam tr. from Mahashweta Devi)
- ... ... .Elangbam Sonamani Singh – Dharma Tattwa (Prose, Manipuri tr. from Bankim Chandra Chattopadhyay)
- ... ... .Purn Sharma 'Puran' – Gora (novel, Rajasthani tr. from Rabindranath Thakur)
- ... ... .Rabindranath Murmu – Ita Chetan Re Ita (novel, Santali tr. from Mahashweta Devi)
- Note – From English – In 1992, Hijam Guno Singh got this prize for Manipuri translation of History of Bengali Literature by Sukumar Sen. In 1991, Radhika Mohan Bhagowati got this prize for Assamese translation of The Story of Our Newspapers by Chanchal Sarkar. In 2012, Sharda Sathe got it for Marathi translation of A Traveller and the Road by Mohit Sen.

== Translations into Bengali ==
- 1989 – Nileena Abraham – Patummar Chhagal O Balyasakhi (short stories, tr. from Malayalam)
- 1990 – Maitri Shukla – Unish Bigha Dui Katha (novel, tr. from Oriya)
- 1991 – Subramanian Krishnamoorthy – Raktabanya (novel, tr. from Tamil)
- 1992 – Maya Gupta – Kak O Kala Pani (short stories, tr. from Hindi)
- 1993 – Manabendra Bandyopadhyay – Vaikom Muhammad Bashirer Shreshtha Galpo (short stories, tr. from Malayalam)
- 1994 – Vina Alase – Gulamgiri (dialogues, tr. from Marathi)
- 1995 – Kanailal Datta – Vinoba Bhave Rachanabali (autobiographical writing, tr. from Hindi)
- 1996 – Ranendranath Bandyopadhyay – Sarpa O Rajju (novel, tr. from English)
- 1997 – Rameshwar shaw – Bhabishyater Kabita (essays, tr. from English)
- 1998 – Jaya Mitra – Jipsy Nadir Dhara (autobiographical writing, tr. from Punjabi)
- 1999 – Shankha Ghosh – Raktakalyan (Taledanda Play, tr. from Kannada)
- 2000 – Afsar Ahmed & Kalim Hazique – Sare Tin Hat Bhume (novel, tr. from Urdu)
- 2001 – Nani Sur – Krishna Chanderer Nirbachito Galpo (short stories, tr. from Urdu)
- 2002 – Usha Ranjan Bhattacharya – Mriityunjay (novel, tr. from Assamese)
- 2003 – Malay Ray Chaudhuri – Suryer Saptam Ashwa (novel, tr. from Hindi) (refused)
- 2004 – Sujit Chaudhuri – Asamiya Galpo Sankalan (short stories, tr. from Assamese)
- 2005 – Ranjan Bandyopadhyay – Kabir Bijak O Anyanya Kabita (poetry, tr. from Hindi)
- 2006 – Jyoti Bhushan Chaki – Kaifi Azmir Kabita (poetry, tr. from Urdu)
- 2007 – Subimal Basak – Aamar Tomar Taar Katha (novel, tr. from Hindi)
- 2008 – Bharati Nandi – Chitrita Andhakar (novel, tr. from Oriya)
- 2009 – Ujjal Singha – Mitro Marjani (novel of Krishna Sovti, tr. from Hindi)
- 2010 – Shyamal Bhattacharya – Kumari Harinir Chokh (short stories, tr. from Punjabi)
- 2011 – Jagat Debnath – Raghaber Din Rat (novel, tr. from Marathi)
- 2012 – Oinam Nilkantha Singh – Bristi Ar Holo Na (short story, tr. from Manipuri)
- 2013 – Soma Bandyopadhyay – Gathanbad, Uttar-Gathanbad Ebang Prachya Kavyatattva (literary criticism, tr. from Urdu)
- 2014 – Binay Kumar Mahata – Ei Prithibi Paglagarad (novel, tr. from Maithili)
- 2015 – Mau Das Gupta – Anamdaser Puthi (novel, tr. from Hindi)
- 2016 - Gita Chaudhuri – Satyer Anwesan (Gandhi's autobiography, tr. from Gujarati)
- 2017 - (Late) Utpal Kumar Basu – Kebal Atmai Jane Kibhabe Gan Gaite Hay: Nirbachita Kabita (poetry, tr. from English)
- 2018 - Mabinul Haq - Lep O Anyanyo Galpo (short stories, tr from Urdu)

(Note: when this article was created in 2007, the list of awardees in various categories was taken from the official site of the Sahitya Akademi. The site has since been revamped and currently does not show any list of awardees; instead it shows a search option for awardees with specified search parameters. For the old version of the site, click here. It gives details about the main awards up to 2007 and translation prizes up to 2005.)
