= Max Müller =

British philologist (1823–1900)

The Right Honourable Max Müller
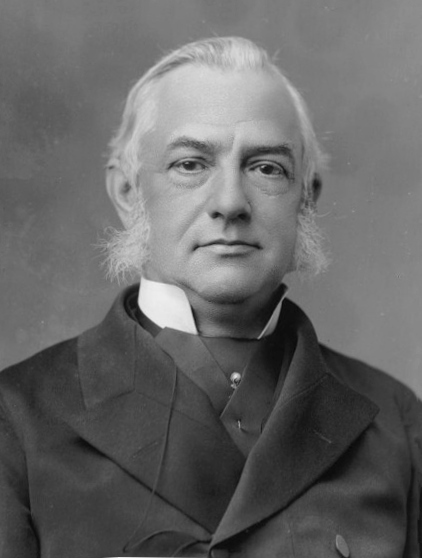
- Müller in 1883, by Alexander Bassano
- Born: Friedrich Max Müller; 6 December 1823; Dessau, Duchy of Anhalt, German Confederation
- Died: 28 October 1900 (aged 76); Oxford, England
- Education: University of Leipzig
- Occupations: Comparative philologist, Orientalist
- Spouse: Georgina Adelaide Grenfell
- Children: 4, including Wilhelm Grenfell Max Müller
- Writing career
- Notable works: The Sacred Books of the East; Chips from a German Workshop
- Notable awards: Associé étranger of the Académie des Inscriptions et Belles-Lettres; Bavarian Maximilian Order for Science and Art; member of the Privy Council

Signature
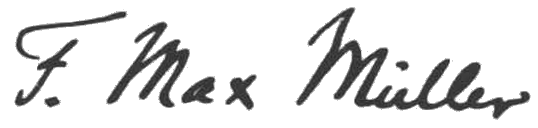

Friedrich Max Müller (German: [ˈfʁiːdʁɪç ˈmaks ˈmʏlɐ]; 6 December 1823 – 28 October 1900) was a German-born British comparative philologist and Orientalist. He was one of the founders of the Western academic disciplines of Indology and religious studies. Müller wrote both scholarly and popular works on the subject of Indology. He directed the preparation of the Sacred Books of the East, a 50-volume set of English translations which continued after his death. He was also the first major scholar to compile the Rigveda Samhita along with the Sāyanācarya commentary, in six volumes entitled Rig-Veda-Sanhita, The Sacred Hymns Of The Brahmans.

Müller became a professor at Oxford University, first of modern languages, then of comparative philology in a position founded for him, and which he held for the rest of his life. Early in his career he held strong views on India, believing that it needed to be transformed by Christianity. Later, his view became more nuanced, championing ancient Sanskrit literature and India more generally. He became involved in several controversies during his career: he was accused of being anti-Christian; he disagreed with Darwinian evolution, favouring theistic evolution; he raised interest in Aryan culture, opposing the racial misuse of the term ‘Aryan’, which later developed into the racist Aryan ideology of the 20th century; and he promoted the idea of a 'Turanian' family of languages.

Among his honours and distinctions, he was made an associé étranger of the French Académie des Inscriptions et Belles-Lettres; he was awarded the Bavarian Maximilian Order for Science and Art; and he was made a member of the Privy Council of the United Kingdom.

== Early life and education ==
Max Müller was born into a cultured family on 6 December 1823 in Dessau, the son of Wilhelm Müller, a lyric poet whose verse Franz Schubert had set to music in his song-cycles Die schöne Müllerin, and Winterreise. His mother, Adelheid Müller (née von Basedow), was the eldest daughter of a prime minister of Anhalt-Dessau. Carl Maria von Weber was a godfather.

Müller was named after his mother's elder brother, Friedrich, and after the central character, Max, in Weber's opera Der Freischütz. Later in life, he adopted Max as a part of his surname, believing that the prevalence of Müller as a name made it too common. His name was recorded as "Maximilian" on some of his honours, and in some other publications.

Müller entered the gymnasium (grammar school) at Dessau when he was six years old. In 1835, at the age of twelve, he was sent to live in the house of the painter Carl Gustav Carus and attended the Nikolaischule at Leipzig, where he continued his studies of music and classics. It was during his time in Leipzig that he frequently met Felix Mendelssohn.

In need of a scholarship to attend Leipzig University, Müller successfully sat his abitur examination at Zerbst. While preparing, he found that the syllabus differed from what he had been taught, requiring him to rapidly learn mathematics, modern languages and science. He entered Leipzig University in 1841 to study philology, leaving behind his early interest in music and poetry. Müller received his Ph.D. degree in September 1843. His final dissertation was on Spinoza's Ethics. He had an aptitude for classical languages, learning Greek, Latin, Arabic, Persian and Sanskrit.

=== Sanskrit studies ===
In 1844, Müller studied in Berlin with Friedrich Schelling. He began to translate the Upanishads for Schelling, and continued to research Sanskrit under Franz Bopp, the first systematic scholar of the Indo-European languages (IE). Schelling led Müller to relate the history of language to the history of religion. At this time, Müller published his first book, a German translation of the Hitopadesa, a collection of Indian fables.

In 1845, Müller moved to Paris to study Sanskrit under Eugène Burnouf. Burnouf encouraged him to publish the complete Rigveda, making use of the manuscripts available in England. He moved to England in 1846 to study Sanskrit texts in the collection of the East India Company. He supported himself at first with creative writing, his novel German Love being popular in its day.

Müller's connections with the East India Company and with Sanskritists based at Oxford University led to a career in Britain, where he eventually became the leading intellectual commentator on the culture of India. At the time, Britain controlled India as part of its Empire. This led to complex exchanges between Indian and British intellectual culture, especially through Müller's links with the Brahmo Samaj.

Müller's Sanskrit studies came at a time when scholars had started to see language development in relation to cultural development. The recent discovery of the Indo-European language group had started to lead to much speculation about the relationship between Greco-Roman cultures and those of more ancient peoples. In particular the Vedic culture of India was thought to have been the ancestor of European Classical cultures. Scholars sought to compare the genetically related European and Asian languages to reconstruct the earliest form of the root-language. The Vedic language, Sanskrit, was thought to be the oldest of the IE languages.

Müller devoted himself to the study of this language, becoming one of the major Sanskrit scholars of his day. He believed that the earliest documents of Vedic culture should be studied to provide the key to the development of pagan European religions, and of religious belief in general. To this end, Müller sought to understand the most ancient of Vedic scriptures, the Rigveda. Müller edited the Rigveda Samhita with the commentary written by the 14th century Sanskrit scholar Sayanacharya in Sanskrit and also translated parts of it for the Sacred Books of the East series. Müller was greatly impressed by Ramakrishna Paramhansa, his contemporary and proponent of Vedantic philosophy, and wrote several essays and books about him.

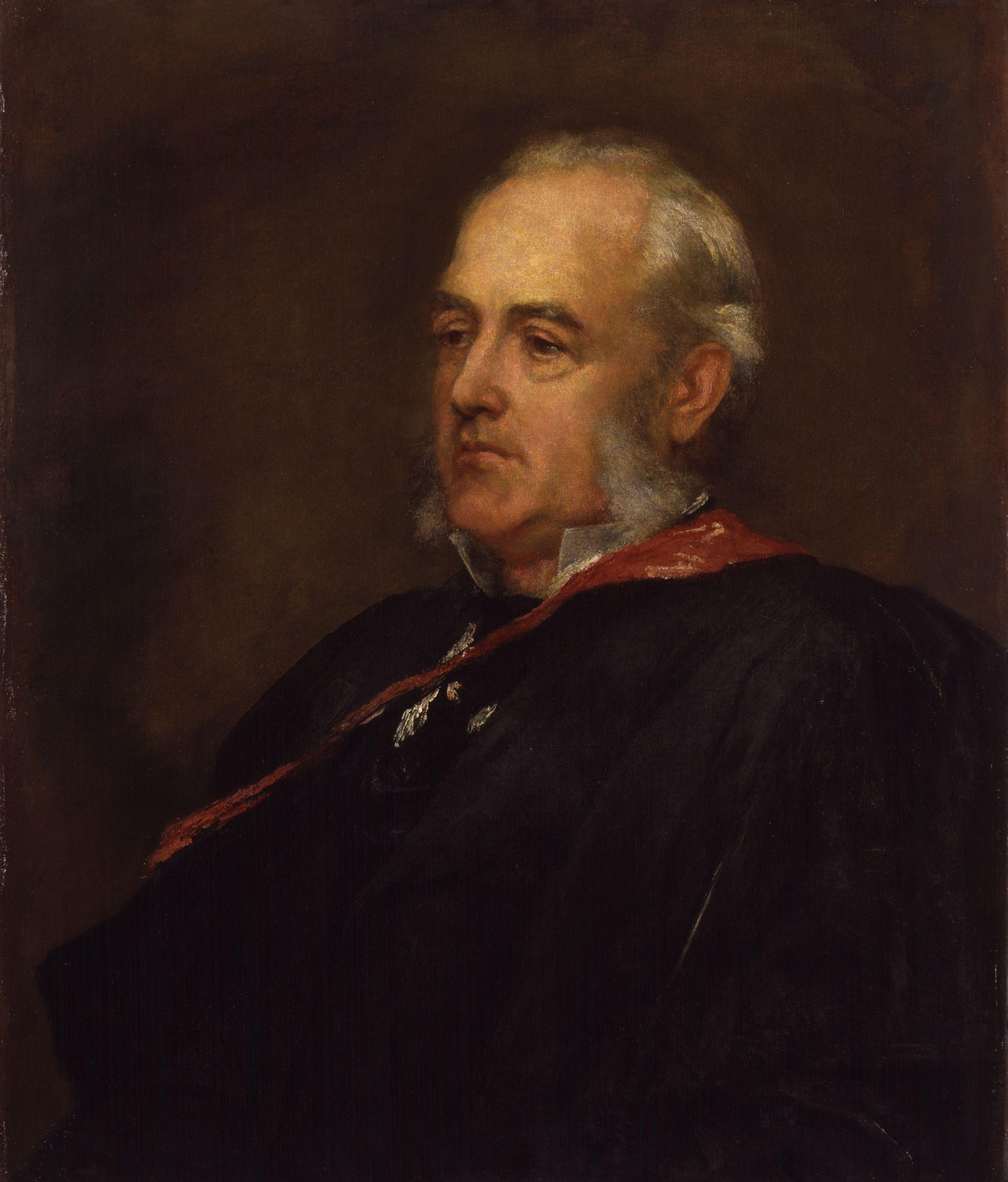
Portrait of the elderly Max Muller by George Frederic Watts, 1894–1895

For Müller, the study of the language had to relate to the study of the culture in which it had been used. He came to the view that the development of languages should be tied to that of belief-systems. At that time the Vedic scriptures were little-known in the West, though there was increasing interest in the philosophy of the Upanishads. Müller believed that the sophisticated Upanishadic philosophy could be linked to the primitive henotheism of early Vedic Brahmanism from which it evolved. He had to travel to London to look at documents held in the collection of the British East India Company. While there he persuaded the company to allow him to undertake a critical edition of the Rigveda, a task he pursued over many years (1849–1874).

For Müller, the culture of the Vedic peoples represented a form of nature worship, an idea clearly influenced by Romanticism. Müller shared many of the ideas associated with Romanticism, which coloured his account of ancient religions, in particular his emphasis on the formative influence on early religion of emotional communion with natural forces. He saw the gods of the Rigveda as active forces of nature, only partly personified as imagined supernatural persons. From this claim Müller derived his theory that mythology is "a disease of language". By this he meant that myth transforms concepts into beings and stories. In Müller's view, "gods" began as words constructed to express abstract ideas, but were transformed into imagined personalities. Thus the Indo-European father-god appears under various names: Zeus, Jupiter, Dyaus Pita. For Müller all these names can be traced to the word "Dyaus", which he understood to imply "shining" or "radiance". This leads to the terms "deva", "deus", "theos" as generic terms for a god, and to the names "Zeus" and "Jupiter" (derived from deus-pater). In this way a metaphor becomes personified and fixed.

== Academic career ==
In 1850 Müller was appointed deputy Taylorian professor of modern European languages at Oxford University. In the following year, at the suggestion of Thomas Gaisford, he was made an honorary M.A. and a member of the college of Christ Church, Oxford. On succeeding to the full professorship in 1854, he received the full degree of M.A. by a decree of Convocation. In 1858 he was elected to a life fellowship at All Souls' College.

He was defeated in the 1860 election for the position of Boden Professor of Sanskrit, which was a "keen disappointment" to him. Müller was far better qualified for the post than the other candidate, Monier Monier-Williams, but Müller's theological views, Lutheranism, German birth, and lack of practical first-hand knowledge of India spoke against him. After the election he wrote to his mother, "all the best people voted for me, the Professors almost unanimously, but the vulgus profanum made the majority".

Later in 1868, Müller became Oxford's first professor of comparative philology, a position founded on his behalf. He held this chair until his death, although he retired from its active duties in 1875.

== Scholarly and literary works ==
=== Gifford Lectures ===
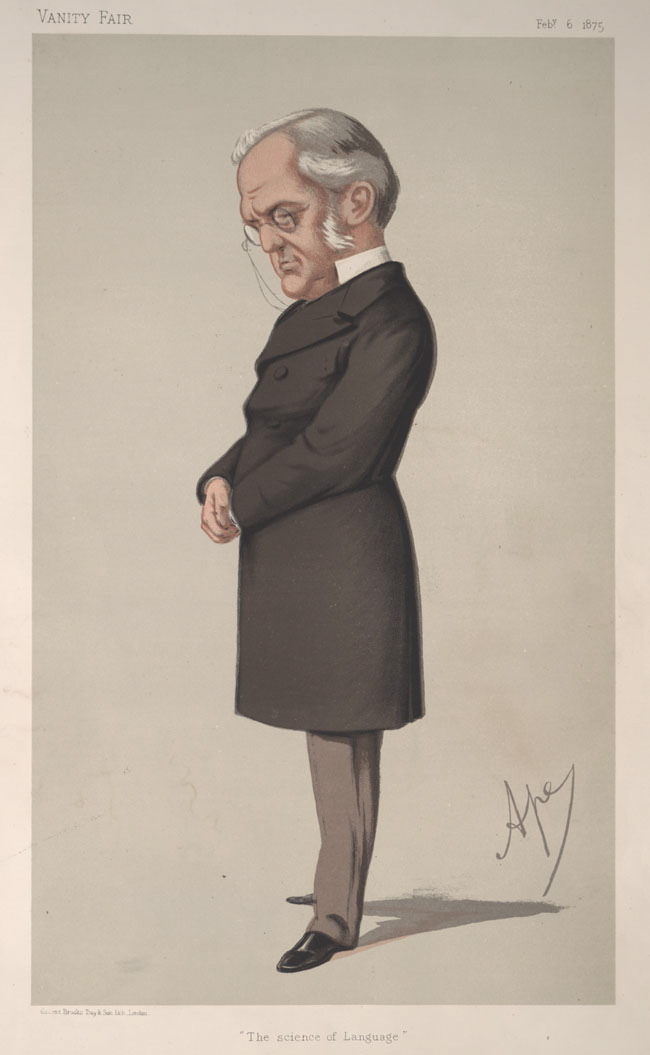
1875 Vanity Fair caricature of Müller confirming that, at the age of fifty-one, with numerous honours, he was one of the truly notable "Men of the Day".

In 1888, Müller was appointed Gifford Lecturer at the University of Glasgow. These Gifford Lectures were the first in an annual series, given at several Scottish universities, that has continued to the present day. Over the next four years, Müller gave four series of lectures. The titles and order of the lectures were as follows:

1. Natural Religion. This first course of lectures was intended as purely introductory, and had for its object a definition of Natural Religion in its widest sense.
2. Physical Religion. This second course of lectures was intended to show how different nations had arrived at a belief in something infinite behind the finite, in something invisible behind the visible, in many unseen agents or gods of nature, until they reached a belief in one god above all those gods. In short, a history of the discovery of the infinite in nature.
3. Anthropological Religion. This third course was intended to show how different nations arrived at a belief in a soul, how they named its various faculties, and what they imagined about its fate after death.
4. Theosophy or Psychological Religion. The fourth and last course of lectures was intended to examine the relation between God and the soul ("these two Infinites"), including the ideas that some of the principal nations of the world have formed concerning this relation. Real religion, Müller asserted, is founded on a true perception of the relation of the soul to God and of God to the soul; Müller wanted to prove that this was true, not only as a postulate, but as an historical fact. The original title of the lectures was 'Psychological Religion' but Müller felt compelled to add 'Theosophy' to it. Müller's final Gifford Lecture is significant in interpreting his work broadly, as he situates his philological and historical research within a Hermetic and mystical theological project.

=== As translator ===
In 1881, he published a translation of the first edition of Kant's Critique of Pure Reason. He agreed with Schopenhauer that this edition was the most direct and honest expression of Kant's thought. His translation corrected several errors that had been committed by previous translators. In his Translator's Preface, Müller wrote:

The bridge of thoughts and sighs that spans the whole history of the Aryan world has its first arch in the Veda, its last in Kant's Critique. ... While in the Veda we may study the childhood, we may study in Kant's Critique of Pure Reason the perfect manhood of the Aryan mind. ... The materials are now accessible, and the English-speaking race, the race of the future, will have in Kant's Critique another Aryan heirloom, as precious as the Veda—a work that may be criticised, but can never be ignored.

Müller continued to be influenced by the Kantian Transcendentalist model of spirituality, and was opposed to Darwinian ideas of human development. He argued that "language forms an impassable barrier between man and beast".

== Views on India ==
=== Early career ===
On 25 August 1866, Müller wrote to Chevalier Bunsen:

India is much riper for Christianity than Rome or Greece were at the time of St. Paul. The rotten tree has for some time had artificial supports, because its fall would have been inconvenient for the government. But if the Englishman comes to see that the tree must fall, sooner or later, then the thing is done... I should like to lay down my life, or at least to lend my hand to bring about this struggle... I do not at all like to go to India as a missionary, that makes one dependent on the parsons... I should like to live for ten years quite quietly and learn the language, try to make friends, and see whether I was fit to take part in a work, by means of which the old mischief of Indian priestcraft could be overthrown and the way opened for the entrance of simple Christian teaching...

— The Life And Letters Of The Right Honourable Friedrich Max Müller Vol. I, Chapter X

In his career, Müller several times expressed the view that a "reformation" within Hinduism needed to occur, comparable to the Christian Reformation. In his view, "if there is one thing which a comparative study of religions places in the clearest light, it is the inevitable decay to which every religion is exposed... Whenever we can trace back a religion to its first beginnings, we find it free from many blemishes that affected it in its later states".

He used his links with the Brahmo Samaj to encourage such a reformation on the lines pioneered by Ram Mohan Roy. Müller believed that the Brahmos would engender an Indian form of Christianity and that they were in practice "Christians, without being Roman Catholics, Anglicans or Lutherans". In the Lutheran tradition, he hoped that the "superstition" and idolatry, which he considered to be characteristic of modern popular Hinduism, would disappear.

Müller wrote:

The translation of the Veda will hereafter tell to a great extent on the fate of India, and on the growth of millions of souls in that country. It is the root of their religion, and to show them what the root is, I feel sure, is the only way of uprooting all that has sprung from it during the last 3,000 years... one ought to be up and doing what may be God's work.

Müller hoped that increased funding for education in India would promote a new form of literature combining Western and Indian traditions. In 1868 he wrote to George Campbell, the newly appointed Secretary of State for India:

India has been conquered once, but India must be conquered again, and that second conquest should be a conquest by education. Much has been done for education of late, but if the funds were tripled and quadrupled, that would hardly be enough (...) By encouraging a study of their own ancient literature, as part of their education, a national feeling of pride and self-respect will be reawakened among those who influence the large masses of the people. A new national literature may spring up, impregnated with Western ideas, yet retaining its native spirit and character (...) A new national literature will bring with it a new national life, and new moral vigour. As to religion, that will take care of itself. The missionaries have done far more than they themselves seem to be aware of, nay, much of the work which is theirs they would probably disclaim. The Christianity of our nineteenth century will hardly be the Christianity of India. But the ancient religion of India is doomed—and if Christianity does not step in, whose fault will it be?

— Max Müller (1868)

=== Late career ===
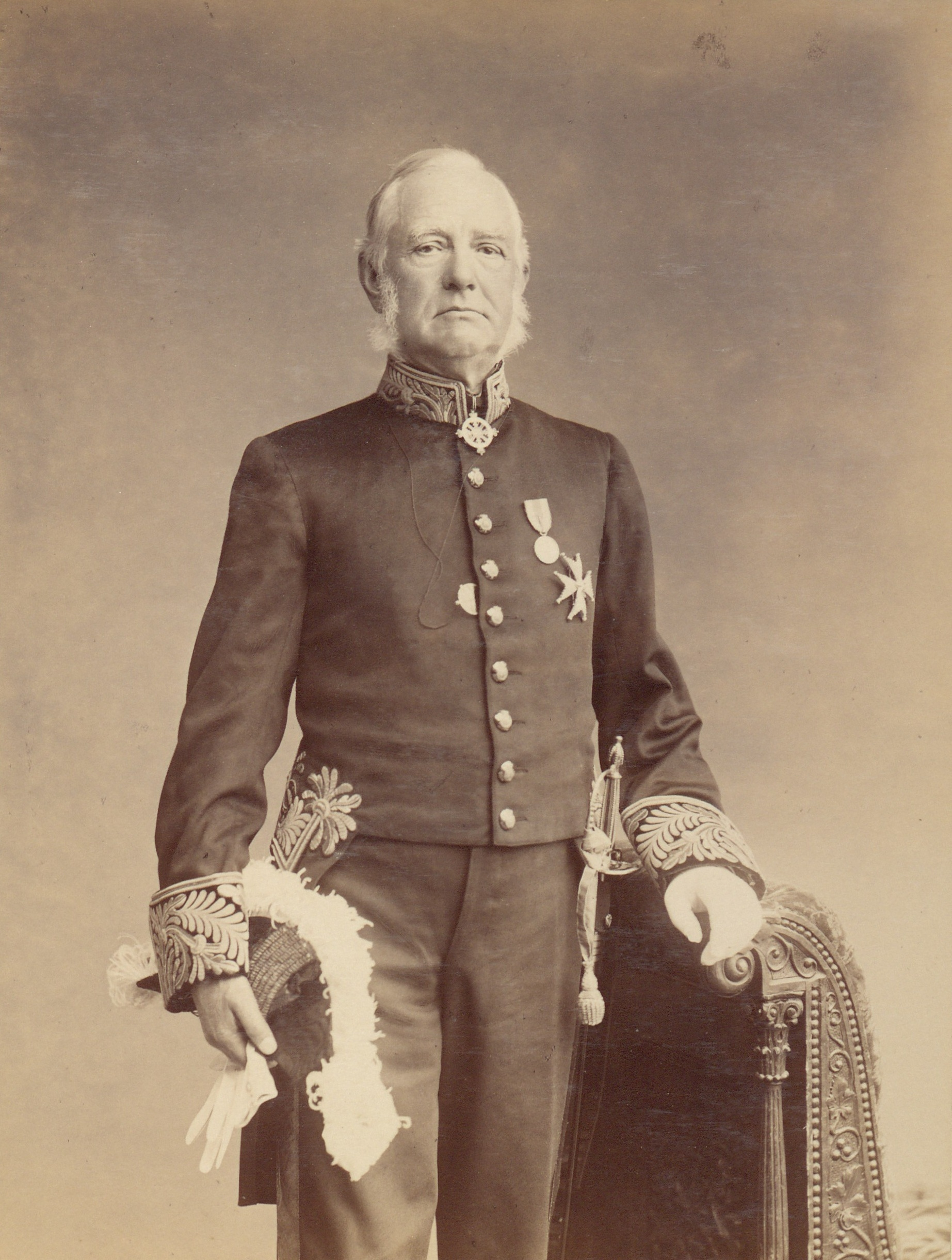
In uniform, 1890s

In his sixties and seventies, Müller gave a series of lectures, which reflected a more nuanced view in favour of Hinduism and the ancient literature from India. In his lecture "What can India teach us?" at the University of Cambridge, he championed ancient Sanskrit literature and India as follows:

If I were to look over the whole world to find out the country most richly endowed with all the wealth, power, and beauty that nature can bestow—in some parts a very paradise on earth—I should point to India. If I were asked under what sky the human mind has most full developed some of its choicest gifts, has most deeply pondered on the greatest problems of life, and has found solutions of some of them which well deserve the attention even of those who have studied Plato and Kant—I should point to India. And if I were to ask myself from what literature we, here in Europe, we who have been nurtured almost exclusively on the thoughts of Greeks and Romans, and of one Semitic race, the Jewish, may draw that corrective which is most wanted in order to make our inner life more perfect, more comprehensive, more universal, in fact more truly human, a life, not for this life only, but a transfigured and eternal life—again I should point to India.

— Max Müller (1883)

Müller conjectured that the introduction of Islam in India in the 11th century had had a deep effect on the psyche and behaviour of Hindus in another lecture, "Truthful Character of the Hindus":

The other epic poem too, the Mahabharata, is full of episodes showing a profound regard for truth. (...) Were I to quote from all the law-books, and from still later works, everywhere you would hear the same key-note of truthfulness vibrating through them all. (...) I say once more that I do not wish to represent the people of India as two hundred and fifty-three millions of angels, but I do wish it to be understood and to be accepted as a fact, that the damaging charge of untruthfulness brought against that people is utterly unfounded with regard to ancient times. It is not only not true, but the very opposite of the truth. As to modern times, and I date them from about 1000 after Christ (AD), I can only say that, after reading the accounts of the terrors and horrors of Mohammedan rule, my wonder is that so much of native virtue and truthfulness should have survived. You might as well expect a mouse to speak the truth before a cat, as a Hindu before a Mohammedan judge.

— Max Müller (1884)

Swami Vivekananda, who was the foremost disciple of Ramakrishna Paramahamsa, met Müller over a lunch on 28 May 1896. Regarding Müller and his wife, the Swami later wrote:

The visit was really a revelation to me. That little white house, its setting in a beautiful garden, the silver-haired sage, with a face calm and benign, and forehead smooth as a child's in spite of seventy winters, and every line in that face speaking of a deep-seated mine of spirituality somewhere behind; that noble wife, the helpmate of his life through his long and arduous task of exciting interest, overriding opposition and contempt, and at last creating a respect for the thoughts of the sages of ancient India—the trees, the flowers, the calmness, and the clear sky—all these sent me back in imagination to the glorious days of ancient India, the days of our brahmarshis and rajarshis, the days of the great vanaprasthas, the days of Arundhatis and Vasishthas. It was neither the philologist nor the scholar that I saw, but a soul that is every day realizing its oneness with the universe.

== Visit to Istanbul and meeting with Abdul Hamid II ==
In 1893, Müller and his wife traveled to the Ottoman Empire, visiting Istanbul and Bursa. The primary purpose was to visit his son, Wilhelm Max-Müller, who worked as a diplomat at the British embassy. During this stay, Müller was granted a private audience with Sultan Abdul Hamid II at the Yıldız Palace. Müller presented the Sultan with his monumental 50-volume edited translation series, Sacred Books of the East. In return, the Sultan presented the Müller family with various gifts and decorated him with an Ottoman imperial order.

The journey significantly altered Müller's perspectives on Islam and the Turks. Prior to 1893, his views reflected typical 19th-century European prejudices regarding Ottoman rule in Anatolia and the Balkans. However, his direct observations of the modernizing Ottoman education system and his interactions with the Sultan shifted his outlook into more nuanced "gray tones". Upon returning to England, he frequently discussed his positive experiences and publicly defended Ottoman resilience. The details of this trip were later compiled and published by his wife, Georgina Müller, in her 1897 book, Letters from Constantinople.

== Controversies ==
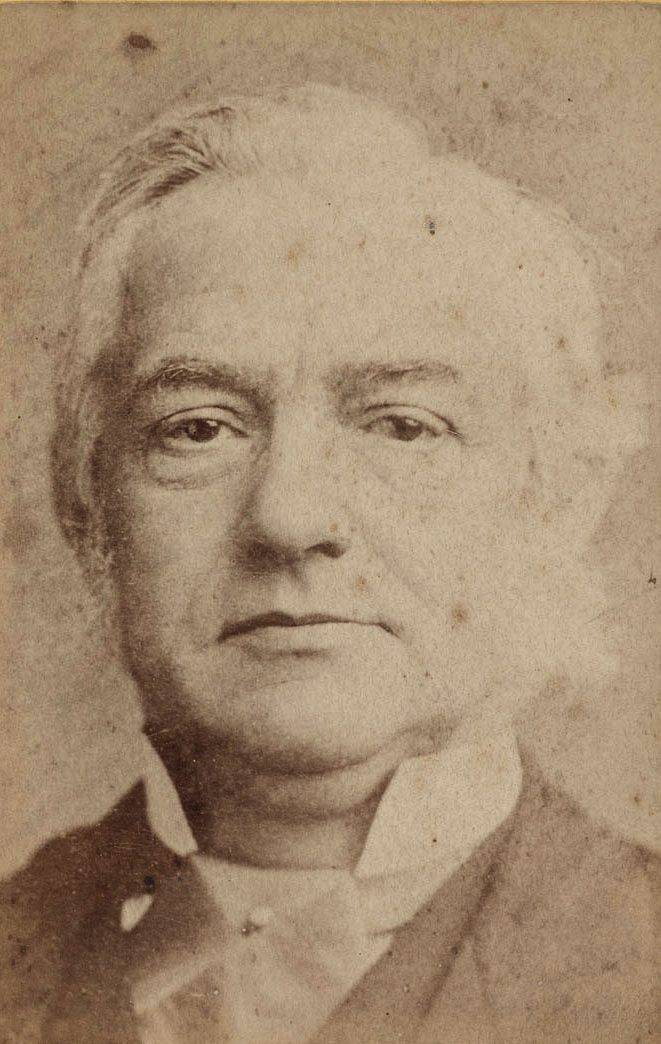
Studio Portrait of Max Müller, c. 1880

=== Alleged anti-Christianity ===
During the course of his Gifford Lectures on the subject of natural religion, Müller was severely criticised for being anti-Christian. In 1891, at a meeting of the Established Presbytery of Glasgow, Mr. Thomson (Minister of Ladywell) moved a motion that Müller's teaching was "subversive of the Christian faith, and fitted to spread pantheistic and infidel views amongst the students and others", and questioned Müller's appointment as lecturer. An even stronger attack on Müller was made by Monsignor Alexander Munro in St Andrew's Cathedral. Munro, an officer of the Roman Catholic Church in Scotland (and Provost of the Catholic Cathedral of Glasgow from 1884 to 1892), declared that Müller's lectures "were nothing less than a crusade against Divine revelation, against Jesus Christ, and against Christianity". The blasphemous lectures were, he continued, "the proclamation of atheism under the guise of pantheism" and "uprooted our idea of God, for it repudiated the idea of a personal God".

Similar accusations had already led to Müller's exclusion from the Boden chair in Sanskrit in favour of the conservative Monier Monier-Williams. By the 1880s Müller was being courted by Charles Godfrey Leland, Theosophist Helena Blavatsky, and other writers who were seeking to assert the merits of pagan religious traditions over Christianity. The designer Mary Fraser Tytler stated that Müller's book Chips from a German Workshop (a collection of his essays) was her "Bible", which helped her to create a multi-cultural sacred imagery.

Müller distanced himself from these developments, and remained within the Lutheran faith in which he had been brought up. According to G. Beckerlegge, "Müller's background as a Lutheran German and his identification with the Broad Church party" led to "suspicion by those opposed to the political and religious positions that they felt Müller represented", particularly his latitudinarianism.

Although Müller took a strong religious and academic interest in Hinduism and other non-Christian religions, and often compared Christianity to religions that many traditional Protestants would have regarded as primitive or false, he grounded his Perennialism in a belief that Christianity possessed the fullest truth of all living religions. Twenty-first century scholars of religion, far from accusing Müller of being anti-Christian, have critically examined Müller's theological project as evidence for a bias towards Christian conceptions of God in early academic religious studies.

=== Darwin disagreement ===
Müller attempted to formulate a philosophy of religion that addressed the crisis of faith engendered by the historical and critical study of religion by German scholars on the one hand, and by the Darwinian revolution on the other. He was wary of Darwin's work on human evolution, and attacked his view of the development of human faculties. His work was taken up by cultural commentators such as his friend John Ruskin, who saw it as a productive response to the crisis of the age. He analyzed mythologies as rationalisations of natural phenomena, primitive beginnings that we might denominate "protoscience" within a cultural evolution. Müller proposed an early, mystical interpretation of theistic evolution, using Darwinism as a critique of mechanical philosophy.

In 1870 Müller gave a short course of three lectures for the British Institution on language as the barrier between man and beast, which he called "On Darwin's Philosophy of Language". Müller specifically disagreed with Darwin's theories on the origin of language and that the language of man could have developed from the language of animals. In 1873, he sent a copy of his lectures to Darwin reassuring him that, though he differed from some of Darwin's conclusions, he was one of his "diligent readers and sincere admirers".

=== Opposition to Aryanism ===
Müller's work contributed to the developing interest in Aryan culture, which often set Indo-European ("Aryan") traditions in opposition to Semitic religions. He "was deeply saddened by the fact that these classifications later came to be expressed in racist terms", as this was far from his intention. For Müller, the discovery of common Indian and European ancestry was a powerful argument against racism, arguing that "an ethnologist who speaks of Aryan race, Aryan blood, Aryan eyes and hair, is as great a sinner as a linguist who speaks of a dolichocephalic dictionary or a brachycephalic grammar" and that "the blackest Hindus represent an earlier stage of Aryan speech and thought than the fairest Scandinavians".

=== Turanian ===
Müller put forward and promoted the theory of a "Turanian" family of languages or speech, comprising the Finnic, Samoyedic, "Tataric" (Turkic), Mongolic and Tungusic languages. According to Müller, these five languages were those "spoken in Asia or Europe not included under the Arian [sic] and Semitic families, with the exception perhaps of the Chinese and its dialects". In addition, they were "nomadic languages," in contrast to the other two families (Aryan and Semitic), which he called State or political languages.

The idea of a Turanian family of languages was not accepted by everyone at the time. Although the term "Turanian" quickly became an archaism (unlike "Aryan"), it did not disappear completely. The idea was absorbed later into nationalist ideologies in Hungary and Turkey.

== Honours and distinctions ==
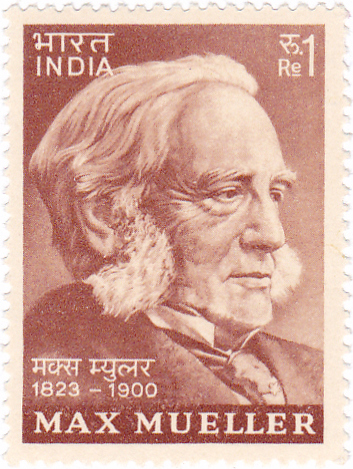
Müller on a 1974 stamp of India

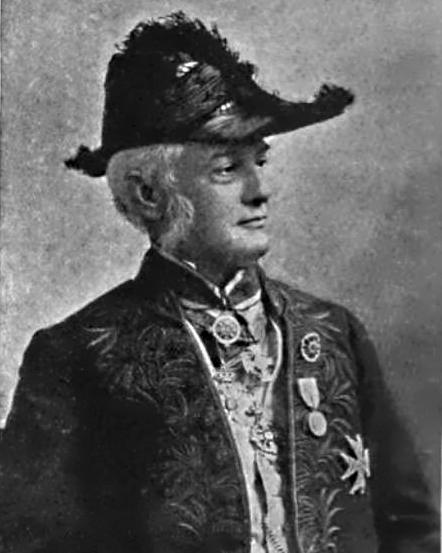
Müller c. 1898, wearing his Habit vert costume with the insignia of the order Pour le Mérite and the Bavarian Maximilian Order for Science and Art

In 1869, Müller was elected to the French Académie des Inscriptions et Belles-Lettres as a foreign correspondent (associé étranger).

In June 1874, Müller was awarded the Pour le Mérite (civil class), much to his surprise. Soon after, when he was commanded to dine at Windsor, he wrote to Prince Leopold to ask if he might wear his Order, and the wire came back, "Not may, but must."

In 1875, Müller was awarded the Bavarian Maximilian Order for Science and Art. The award is given to acknowledge excellent and outstanding achievements in the field of science and art. In a letter to his mother dated 19 December, Müller wrote that the award was more showy than the Pour le Mérite, "but that is the best".

In 1896, Müller was appointed a member of the Privy Council.

== Personal life ==
Müller became a naturalised British citizen in 1855, at the age of 32. He married Georgina Adelaide Grenfell on 3 August 1859 after overcoming the opposition from her family. The couple had four children, including William Grenfell. Two of their children predeceased them.

== Death and legacy ==
Müller's health began deteriorating in 1898 and he died at his home in Oxford on 28 October 1900. He was interred at Holywell Cemetery on 1 November 1900.

After his death a memorial fund, the Max Müller Memorial Fund, was opened at Oxford for "the promotion of learning and research in all matters relating to the history and archaeology, the languages, literatures, and religions of ancient India".

The Goethe Institutes in India are named Max Müller Bhavan in his honour, as is a street (Max Mueller Marg) in New Delhi.

Müller's biographies include Van den Bosch (2002), Stone (2002) and Chaudhuri (1974). Nirad C. Chaudhuri's Scholar Extraordinary was awarded the Sahitya Akademi Award for English by Sahitya Akademi, India's National Academy of Letters. In addition, Stephen G. Alter's 2005 book William Dwight Whitney and the Science of Language contains a chapter on Müller's rivalry with the American linguist William Dwight Whitney.

Swami Vivekananda praised Mueller, and remarked, "Max Müller is a Vedantist of Vedantists. He has, indeed, caught the real soul of the melody of the Vedanta, in the midst of all its settings of harmonies and discords — the one light that lightens the sects and creeds of the world, the Vedanta, the one principle of which all religions are only applications."

Other Indian figures such as Nirad C. Chaudhuri, Sri Aurobindo and others were also influenced by Mueller.

== Publications ==
Müller's scholarly works, published separately as well as an 18-volume Collected Works, include:

- Nārāyana; Müller, Max (ed. & tr.) (1844). Hitopadesa: eine alte indische Fabelsammlung (in German). Leipzig: F. A. Brockhaus. OCLC 6679332.
- Müller, Max, ed. (1858). The German classics from the fourth to the nineteenth century. London: Longmans. OCLC 793718181.
- Müller, Max (1859). A History of Ancient Sanskrit Literature. London: Williams and Norgate. OCLC 2994706.
- Müller, Max (1866). Lectures on the Science of Language. London: Longmans, Green & Co. OCLC 1070792446.
- Müller, Max; Bunsen, C. K. J. (1868–1875). Chips from a German Workshop. London: Longmans, Green & Co. OCLC 700979941. 5 vols.
- Müller, Max (1870). Introduction to the Science of Religion. London: Spottiswoode. OCLC 58972203.
- Müller, Max (1878). Lectures on the origin and growth of religion. London: Longmans, Green & Co. OCLC 221232055.
- Müller, Max (tr.) (1879–1884). The Upanishads. Oxford: Clarendon Press. OCLC 1416388926.
- Kant, Immanuel (1881). Critique of Pure Reason [Kritik der reinen Vernunft]. Translated by F. Max Müller. London: Macmillan. OCLC 1106845795 – via Internet Archive.
- Müller, Max (1883). India: what Can it Teach Us?. London: Longmans, Green & Co. OCLC 458768544.
- Müller, Max (1884). Biographical Essays. London: Longmans, Green & Co. OCLC 251576949.
- Müller, Max; Macdonell, Arthur Anthony (1886). A Sanskrit grammar for beginners. London: Longmans, Green & Co. OCLC 156080873.
- Müller, Max (1887). The Science of Thought. OCLC 1086677282. 2 vols.
- Müller, Max (1888). Studies in Buddhism. OCLC 844556126.
- Müller, Max (1888). Biographies of Words and the Home of the Aryas. London: Longmans, Green & Co. OCLC 876089311.
- Müller, Max (1888). Natural Religion. Gifford Lectures. London: Longmans, Green & Co. OCLC 21342863.
- Müller, F. Max (1890–1892). Rig-Veda-Samhita: The Sacred Hymns of the Brahmans (2nd ed.). London: Henry Frowde. 4 vols.
- Müller, Max (1891). Physical Religion. Gifford Lectures. London: Longmans, Green & Co. OCLC 1068602567.
- Müller, Max (1892). Anthropological Religion. Gifford Lectures. London: Longmans, Green & Co. OCLC 470344671.
- Müller, Max (1893). Memories. London: A.C. McClurg & Co. OCLC 679733299.
- Müller, Max (1893). Theosophy, or Psychological Religion. Gifford Lectures. London: Longmans, Green & Co. OCLC 427662759.
- Müller, Max (1897). Contributions to the Science of Mythology. Vol. 2. London: Longmans, Green & Co.
- Müller, Max (1898). Auld Lang Syne. London: Longmans, Green & Co. OCLC 934825847. 2 vols.
- Müller, Max (1899). The Six Systems of Indian Philosophy. New York: Longmans, Green & Co. OCLC 458768755.
- Müller, Max (1901). My Autobiography: A Fragment. London and Bombay: Longmans, Green & Co. OCLC 606296937.
