= Anila Dalal =

- Born: Anila Amrutlal Dalal; 21 October 1933 (age 92); Ahmedabad, Gujarat, India
- Education: Gujarat University; University of Illinois
- Occupations: Literary critic, translator
- Writing career
- Language: Gujarati

Signature
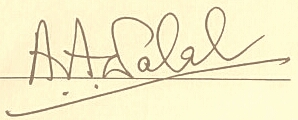

Anila Amrutlal Dalal is an Indian Gujarati-language literary critic and translator. She received the 1993 Sahitya Akademi Translation Prize.

== Life ==
Anila Dalal was born on 21 October 1933 in Ahmedabad to Amritlal Dalal. She completed her SSC in 1949, BA in English in 1954, MA in English in 1956, and later Ph.D. from Gujarat University. She received an MS from the University of Illinois in 1959. She is a retired professor and Head of the Department of English at Sardar Vallabhbhai Patel Arts College, Ahmedabad, where she taught from June 1960 to the 1990s. She received PhD in 1990 from Gujarat University for her thesis on the novels of Iris Murdoch.

== Works ==
Ravindranath ane Sharatchandrana Katha Sahityama Nari (1979) is two parts work on criticism of females in the works of Rabindranath Tagore and Sarat Chandra Chattopadhyay. The first part has seven articles on the works of Tagore, while the second part has five articles on the works of Chattopadhyay. Deshantar (1981) is a work on literature of several languages: German, Russian, Hebrew, French, Greek, Italian, Spanish and laureates; Ted Hughes, Harold Pinter, Philip Larkin, Bertolt Brecht, Alexander Solzhenitsyn, Iris Murdoch. Darpannu Nagar (1987), Manushi - Shityama Nari (1993), Navalkathama Chetanapravah (1994), and Nivedan (1999) are her other works of criticism.

She translated three Bengali novels of Sunil Gangopadhyay: Radhakrishna (1981), Aranyaman Deen Raat (1983), and Pratidwandwi (1986). She translated Bimal Kar's Balika Vadhu (1989) and Prachhanna (1991) from Bengali. She translated Devesh Ray's Tistakanthanu Vrutant (1997). She also translated Mahabharata: Ek Aadhunik Drishtikon (1980) by Buddhadeb Bosu, Maharshi Devendranath Thakur (1980) by Narayan Chaudhary, Chaudhari, Laxminath Bejbarua (1985) by Hem Barua. She also translated several essays of Tagore in Ravindra Nibandhmala Part 2 (1976) and more than seventy songs of Tagore in Geet Panchshati (1978). She also translated letters of Tagore as Chinna Patra Marmar (1993). She also translated The Later Novels of Iris Murdoch (1993) from English. She translated Tarashankar Bandopadyay (1994) by Mahasweta Devi, Ravindra Sanchay, and Vrindavan Morli Vage Chhe. She translated Rama Mehta's English novel Inside the Haveli as Havelini Andar (2003).

== Awards ==
She received the Gujarati Sahitya Parishad award in 1994, the Gujarat Sahitya Academy award in 1994, and the Sahitya Akademi Translation Prize in 1993 for Prachhanna.

== See also ==
- List of Gujarati-language writers
