= William Max Muller =

British diplomat (1867–1945)

Sir William Max Muller GBE KCMG CB MVO
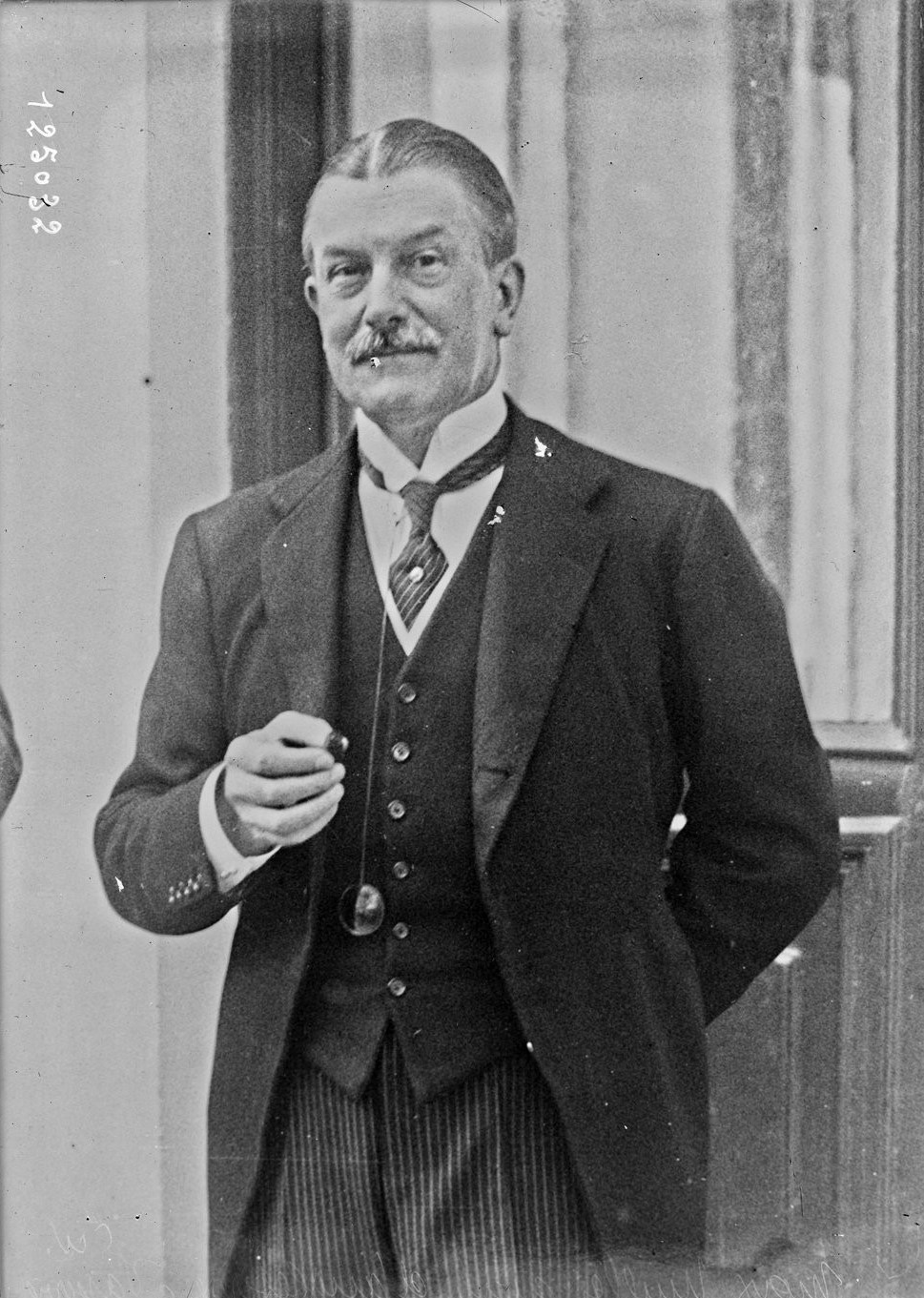
- Max Muller in 1927.

Sir William Grenfell Max Muller (born Wilhelm; 9 June 1867 – 10 May 1945) was a British diplomat. (Note: Depending on the source, his last name is spelt with or without a hyphen and with or without an ü.) He was British Minister to Poland from 1920 to 1928.

== Biography ==
The youngest child and only son of the German-born philologist and Orientalist, Max Müller, he was educated at Eton College, where he was a scholar and won the Prince Consort's German Prize, and University College, Oxford, where he took honours in jurisprudence in 1889.

He entered the Diplomatic Service as an attaché in 1892 and was posted to Constantinople, where he was successively third and second secretary. He was transferred to The Hague in 1898, to Washington in 1899, and to Madrid in 1901. Employed at the Foreign Office from 1902 to 1905, he was promoted to first secretary in 1905. The following year, he was sent to Mexico City, where he acted as chargé d'affaires from 1905 to 1906. In 1907, he went to Christiania, where he was head of Chancery and served as chargé d'affaires twice. He was appointed a MVO in 1908.

In 1909, he was posted to Peking as counsellor of embassy, where he served as chargé d'affaires in 1910. Appointed a CB in 1911, he served at the Foreign Office from 1911 to 1912, and was a British delegate to the International Opium Conference at The Hague in 1911 and 1913.

In 1913, he was sent to Budapest as consul-general: although a consular post, it was always held by a diplomat, owing to the duties involved. On the outbreak of the First World War in 1914, he returned to London in August and was employed in the Foreign Office. He was promoted to the rank of minister plenipotentiary in 1918. In 1920, he went abroad again, this time as Envoy Extraordinary and Minister Plenipotentiary to Poland, where he served until 1928. He was appointed KCMG in 1922 and a Knight Grand Cross of the Order of the British Empire (GBE) in the 1928 Birthday Honours on his retirement.

== Family ==
He married in 1908 Wanda Maria (1883–1970), daughter of Professor Jacob Munch Heiberg. Lady Max-Muller was painted by Philip de László, but later accused him of disloyalty during the First World War.

They had two sons. Charles Frederick Grenfell Max-Muller (1909–1984), head of Outside Broadcasts (Sound) at the BBC, and John Max-Muller (born 1912).
