= Santosh Kumar Ghosh =

Indian Bengali writer

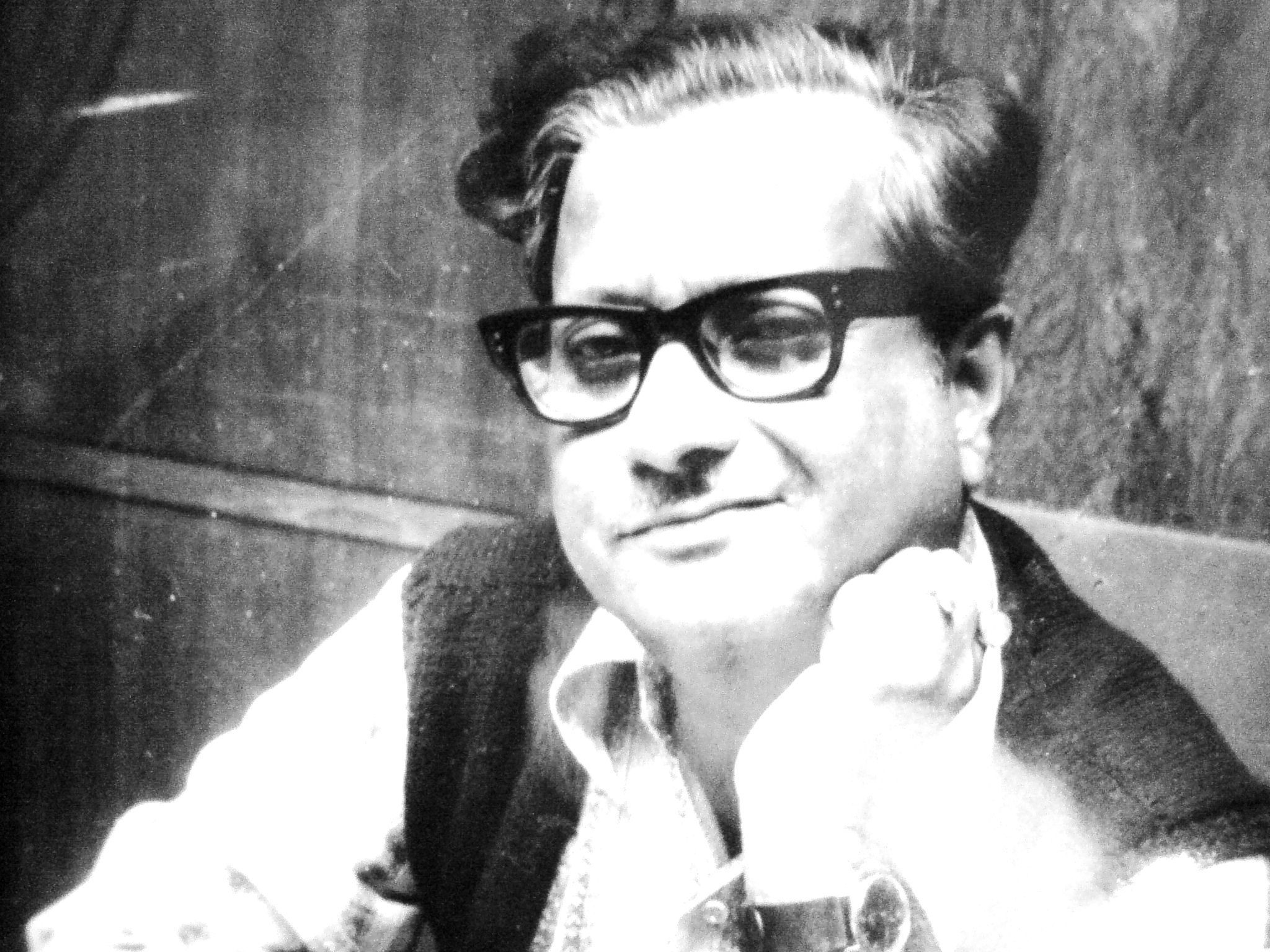
- Santosh Kumar Ghosh
- Born: 9 September 1920; Faridpur, Bengal, British India
- Died: 26 February 1985 (aged 64); Kolkata, West Bengal, India
- Occupations: Journalist, novelist
- Known for: Shesh Namaskar (1971)
- Awards: Sahitya Akademi Award (1972); Ananda Puraskar (1971); Bisesh Ananda Puraskar (1972)
- Honours: D.Lit. from Taiwan Kobisangha

Santosh Kumar Ghosh (9 September 1920 – 26 February 1985) was an Indian Bengali litterateur and a journalist of repute.

== Early life ==
Born in Faridpur district of what is now in Bangladesh, Santosh Kumar had his ancestral house in Barisal district. Son of Suresh Chandra Ghosh and Sarajubala Devi, he passed the Matriculation examination with a first division scoring very high percentage in both Bengali and mathematics. In the year 1940 he passed B.A. examination with a distinction.

== Career as journalist ==
In the year 1941 Santosh Kumar started his career as journalist in Pratyaha Daily. Later in his career he worked in Jugantar and The Statesman and finally in the year 1951 went to Delhi to join Hindusthan Standard, the English publication of Anandabazar Patrika. He also worked for The Morning News and The Nation. In 1958 Santosh Kumar returned to Kolkata as the news editor Anandabazar Patrika. In 1964 he was made the associate editor of both the publications, Anandabazar Patrika and Hindusthan Standard. Finally in 1976 he became the joint editor of Anandabazar Patrika. He attended many forums of journalists in America, Europe, Japan, Korea, Pakistan, Russia and many other countries.

== Literary works ==
Renowned as a short story and novel writer Santosh Kumar also tried his hand in other literary forms like drama, poetry and essays. Two of his plays, Ajatak (1969) and Aparthibo (1971) are worth mentioning. As for poems there is a collection named Kabitar Praye (1980). His first published poem was 'Prithibi' (Nabashakti, 1937) and first published short story was 'Bilaati Dak' (Bharatbarsha, 1937). Amongst essays are 'Rabindrachinta', 1978, 'Rabir kar', 1984. Apart from these Santosh Kumar also tried his hand in juvenile literature. 'Dupurer Dike' written by him which was published in the year 1980 was meant for such young adults.

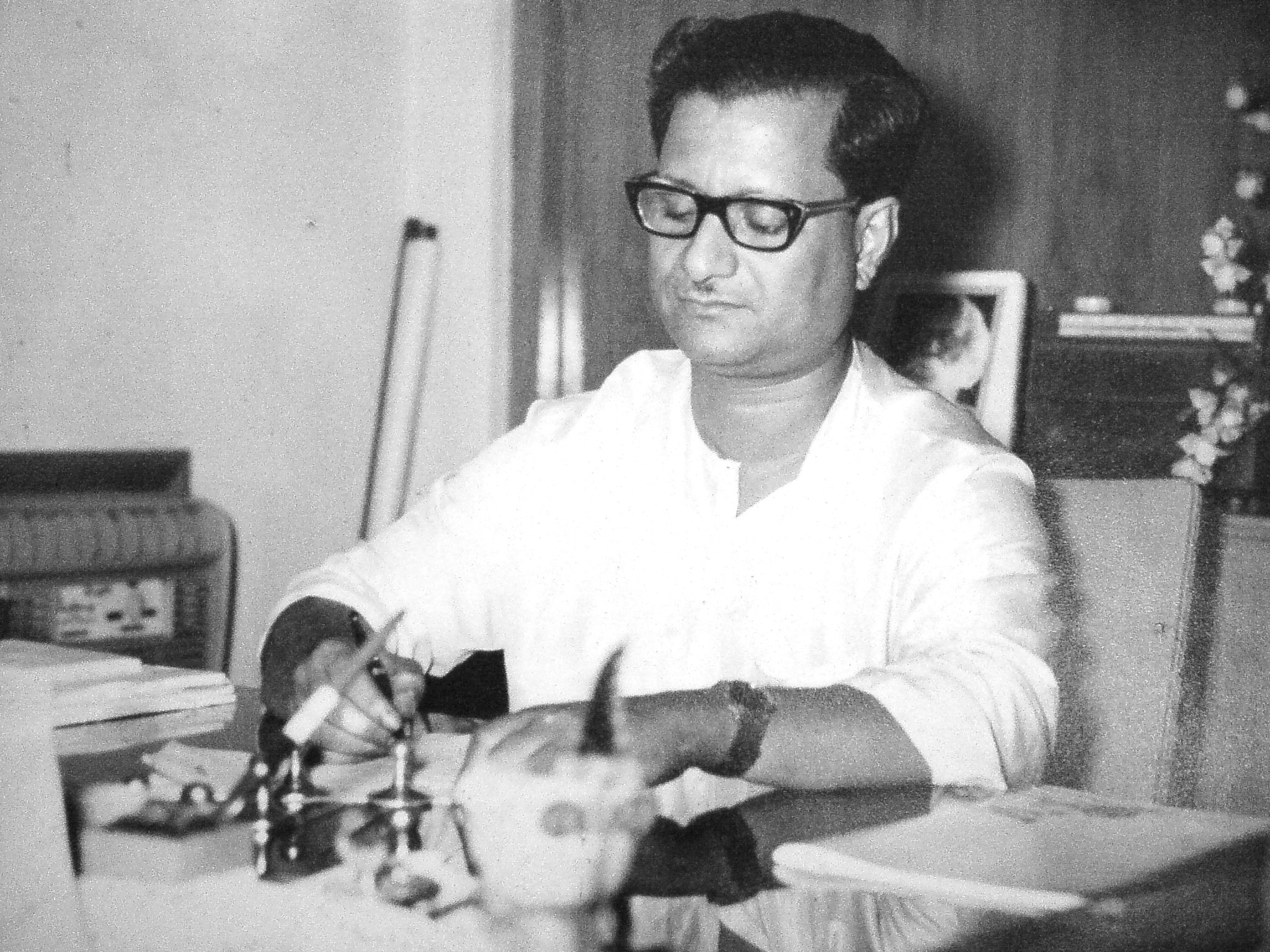
Photograph of Santosh Kumar Ghosh taken at ABP Office

His first novel was Kinu Goalar Gali (published in 1950 in the magazine Desh) which immediately caught the attention of readers and contemporary writers. Nana Ranger Din (1952), Momer Putul (1958) which was later named as Shudhar Shohor, Mukher Rekha (1959), Renu Tomar Mon (1959), Jol Dao (1967), Swayang Nayak (1969), Sesh Namaskar Sricharaneshu Maa Ke (1971), are some of the other novels that Santosh Kumar wrote. Among his short story collections are Chinemati (1953), which has been translated later as Porcelain and Other Stories, Parabat (1953), Dui Kananer Pakhi (1959), Kusumer Mash (1959), Santosh Kumar Ghosh Golpo Samagra 1st, 2nd and 3rd part (1994, 1995) etc.

During his last days, when suffering from cancer at the Breach Candy Hospital, Mumbai, Santosh Kumar wrote some letters, maintained a diary and also wrote his last short story, 'Cholar Pathe' which was published collectively posthumously in 1996.

=== Literary style and uniqueness ===
Ghosh was extremely keen on exposing corruption in his time. Santosh Kumar Ghosh was always sympathetic towards the oppressed people. He wrote about the degeneration of human values during the turbulent post-World War II years in 'Kinu Goalar Gali' and in 'Sudhar Shahar'. The former was translated into many major Indian languages and was made into a Bengali movie a few years later (1964). Sisir Kumar Das wrote that "his forte is the impact of the socio-economic changes on the moral life of the middle class".

In 'Nana Ranger Din' the nationalist movement of pre-independent India is voiced through the autobiographical perspective. In 'Mukher Rekha', 'Jal Dao', and 'Swayang nayak' and 'Sesh Namaskar: Sricharaneshu Maa ke', where Santosh Kumar has combined the autobiographical and confessional mode of narration to deal with the roots of different social evils. Shesh Namaskar has been translated into English by Ketaki Datta under the title "Shesh Namaskar (The Last Salute)" and published by Sahitya Akademi (2013), ISBN 978-81-260-3338-6. A continuous seeker of new fictional methods, he wrote 'Renu Tomar Mon' in second person point of view (which is still unique in Bengali literature) and at the same time combined poetry, essay and story in his book Mile Omile.

== Awards and recognition ==
Voice of Santosh Kumar Ghosh
Santosh Kumar Ghosh AIR Interview Excerpt
Excerpt from the recording of an interview broadcast of Santosh Kumar Ghosh in All India Radio - Kolkata

Throughout his literary career Santosh Kumar won various awards. Some of the notable ones listed below:

- Ananda Puroshkar in the year 1971.
- Bisesh Ananda in 1972.
- The Sahitya Akademi Award in 1972.
- Honorary D.Lit from Taiwan Kobisangha in 1984.
