= Bangalir Itihas: Adiparba =

History book by Niharranjan Ray

- Author: Niharranjan Ray
- Language: Bengali
- Publisher: The Book Emporium
- Publication date: 1949
- Publication place: India
- Media type: Printed book
- Awards: Rabindra Puraskar (1950)

Bangalir Itihas: Adiparba is a book on the history of ancient Bengal and Bengalis written by Niharranjan Ray. It was published in 1949 by The Book Emporium. The subject of the book is the history of the Bengalis and the homeland of the Bengalis; especially the past society, culture and economic life.

Niharranjan Ray was an Indian-Bengali historian, literary critic and art-researcher, and had a special interest in the history of the Bengalis. He was a distinguished member of several research institutes, and a professor at University of Calcutta. At the invitation of the Bangiya Sahitya Parishat, he gave a lecture on the history of the Bengalis at the Adharacandra baktr̥tāmālā in 1346 Baṅgābda; the president of the session, Jadunath Sarkar, urged him to write a complete history of the Bengalis. The author wrote ten of the book's fifteen chapters while in prison.

Niharranjan Ray was awarded the Rabindra Puraskar, the highest literary award of West Bengal, in 1950 as the author of Bangalir Itihas: Adiparba.

== Background ==
Niharranjan Ray was invited to deliver three lectures on any aspect or episode of Indian history at the Adharacandra baktr̥tāmālā organized by the Bangiya Sahitya Parishat in 1346 Baṅgābda. Historian Jadunath Sarkar presided over the three-day lecture meeting. He praised Niharranjan Roy for his presiding remarks at the session, and called for the writing of a comprehensive book on history of Bengalis. Niharranjan Roy's speeches were published and appreciated in the magazine published by the Bangiya Sahitya Parishat. But at that time, the first volume of a book on the history of Bengal was being written and edited by the University of Dhaka, due to which he was not interested in writing a new book on the same subject.

A book on the history of Bengal was published by the University of Dhaka in 1349 under the title "History of Bengal" edited by Ramesh Chandra Majumdar. Niharranjan Roy praised the book, and also became interested in writing the history of Bengalis.

== Production ==
Niharranjan Ray was associated with the Quit India Movement. As a result, he was imprisoned by the British police in 1943. He thought about writing the book (Bangalir Itihas: Adiparba) before he was imprisoned. According to the author, he got free time during his imprisonment and during this free time he started writing the book. However, he could not complete the book during his imprisonment; of the 15 chapters of the book, completed ten chapters during imprisonment. In 1944, Niharranjan Roy was released from prison. He started the process of publishing the book from The Book Emporium with the help of his friend Birendranath Ghosh. He continued to write the remaining five chapters during the printing of the book's ten chapters. But around this time the 1946 Calcutta Killings broke out on Direct Action Day, resulting in a complete one-year stoppage of printing. Finally, in 1949, the work of printing the book was completed and published.

== Contents ==
The book covers its contents in 15 chapters:

=== Prathama adhyāẏa: Itihāsēra yukti ===
In this chapter, author Niharranjan Roy argues why he named the book Bangalir Itihas (History of Bengalis). He tried to highlight the basic meaning of Bengalis's history. He pointed out that various works and books related to the history of Bengal had been published for 50 years prior to the writing of this book. Historians and scholars have published many researches on this subject. He also said that the writers or historians of this period mainly wrote history based on the reign of the kings who ruled Bengal and their dynasties. After that, he said that in his book, he mainly presented the history of Bengalis social life, and according to him, the history of this social life is the history of Bengalis.

=== Ēkādaśa adhyāẏa: Dainandina jībana ===
In this chapter, writer Niharranjan Roy describes the daily life of Bengalis at that time. Food habits, hunting and sports, clothing, ornamentation, rural lifestyles, lower caste lifestyles and women's society are described. In this chapter it is mentioned that rice was the staple food of Bengalis from the earliest times. Bengalis have acquired the habit of eating rice from the civilization and culture of the Austric-speaking Proto-Australoid. The author mentions fish, meat, curries and fruits in the Bengali diet. Hunting was the prominent sport among kings and feudal lords, and the Kari game, the Bagh bandi game and the sholghara game were prominent sports among women. The Bengali society of that time used ornaments, both men and women used ornaments such as kanthahar (necklace) and mekhla.

== Publication ==
The Book Emporium was the publishing house of the book. The publishing house first published the book in 1949. However, the first edition of the book quickly sold out. In 1951, the publishing house published a reprint (second edition) of the first edition. 2,200 copies of the first reprint sold out within a year.

Paścimabaṅga nirakṣaratā dūrīkaraṇa samiti (English: West Bengal Illiteracy Eradication Society) published the third edition of the book in 1980. This edition of the book was published in two volumes. A total of 10,000 copies of the book were published in the edition. A new edition was published by Dey's Publishing in 1992.

== Bibliography ==
- Ray, Niharranjan (1993). বাঙ্গালীর ইতিহাস: আদি পর্ব Bāṅgālīra itihāsa: Ādiparba [History of Bengalis: Early Phases] (PDF) (in Bengali) (Dey's [3rd] ed.). Kolkata: Dey's Publishing. ISBN 81-7079-270-3.
- Ray, Niharranjan (2022). বাঙ্গালীর ইতিহাস: আদি পর্ব Bāṅgālīra itihāsa: Ādiparba [History of Bengalis: Early Phases] (in Bengali) (Dey's [17th] ed.). Kolkata: Dey's Publishing. ISBN 978-81-295-1977-1.
