= Sujit Mukherjee =

Indian writer and cricketer

- Born: 21 August 1930; Ariadaha, Bengal, British India
- Died: 14 January 2003 (aged 72); Hyderabad, Andhra Pradesh, India
- Education: St. Xavier's High School, Patna
- Alma mater: Patna College
- Spouse: Meenakshi Mukherjee

Sujit Mukherjee (21 August 1930 – 14 January 2003) was an Indian writer, translator, literary critic, publisher, teacher and cricketer.

== Career ==
Sujit Mukherjee was born in the village of Ariadaha, south of Calcutta, and educated at St. Xavier's High School, Patna, Patna College (MA) and the University of Pennsylvania (PhD). He taught at Patna College, at the National Defence Academy in Khadakwasla, and at the University of Poona before joining Orient Longman in 1970, where he served as Chief Publisher until 1986.

He was a prolific writer on a range of literary topics, as well as a translator from Bangla into English.

== Cricket ==
Sujit Mukherjee
Cricket information
- Batting: Right-handed
- Role: Batsman

Domestic team information
- Years: Team
- 1951–52 to 1959–60: Bihar

Career statistics
Competition	First-class
Matches	5
Runs scored	79
Batting average	11.28
100s/50s	0/0
Top score	33
Balls bowled	6
Wickets	0
Bowling average	–
5 wickets in innings	–
10 wickets in match	–
Best bowling	–
Catches/stumpings	3/–
- Source: ESPNCricinfo, 24 July 2021

Despite having to wear thick glasses to compensate for his myopia, Mukherjee had a long career as a batsman in university, club and first-class cricket. He played five first-class matches as a middle-order batsman for Bihar between 1951 and 1960. He made his highest score, 33, in his first innings in 1951–52.

Returning to the side for Bihar's last Ranji Trophy game in 1958–59, he made the equal top score for the match, 17 not out, in the second innings in a match in Patna in which only 188 runs were scored for the loss of 32 wickets. After being dismissed for 49 in their first innings, Bihar needed 45 to beat Orissa and were 19 for 2 when Mukherjee came to the wicket and shared an unbroken partnership of 27 with Satyendra Kuckreja, the highest partnership of the match, to take Bihar to victory.

Mukherjee became a noted cricket writer, "a wry observer of both the game and academic pretentiousness" who produced "five elegant cricket books". Ramachandra Guha described them as "the finest books ever written on cricket by an Indian". Mukherjee also did radio commentary for Test cricket between 1975 and 1978.

== Personal life ==
Mukherjee married in January 1959. His wife, Meenakshi Mukherjee, who had been one of his early students, was also a literary scholar. They had two daughters. They lived the final years of their lives in Hyderabad.

== Sujit Mukherjee Memorial Lecture ==
The Centre for Comparative Literature at the University of Hyderabad inaugurated the annual Sujit Mukherjee Memorial Lecture in 2014. Lecturers and the titles of their lectures have been:

- 2014: Nabaneeta Dev Sen – "Translations and Multilingualism"
- 2015: Indra Nath Choudhuri – "The Idea of an Indian Literature"
- 2016: Sukanta Chaudhuri – "My Tagore, Your Tagore: Translation and Textual Identity"

== Books ==
=== On cricket ===
- The Romance of Indian Cricket 1968
- Playing for India 1972
- Between Indian Wickets 1977
- Matched Winners 1996
- Autobiography of an Unknown Cricketer 1997
- An Indian Cricket Century: Selected Writings 2002

=== On literature ===
- A Passage to America: Reception of Rabindranath Tagore in USA 1913–1941 1964
- Indian Essays in American Literature: Papers in Honour of Robert A. Spiller 1969 (edited with D.V.K. Raghavacharyulu)
- Towards a Literary History of India 1975
- Some Positions on a Literary History of India 1980
- Translation as Discovery and Other Essays on Indian Literature in English Translation 1981
- The Idea of an Indian Literature: A Book of Readings 1981 (edited)
- Forster and Further: The Tradition of Anglo-Indian Fiction 1993
- A Dictionary of Indian Literature: Volume I (Beginnings to 1850) 1999

=== Translations into English ===
- Bewitched Veil (Monindra Ray's Mohini Adal) 1968
- Naked King and Other Poems (poems by Nirendranath Chakrabarty, translated jointly with Meenakshi Mukherjee) 1975
- Book of Yudhishthir (Buddhadeb Bose's Mahabharater Katha) 1986
- Three Companions (three long stories by Rabindranath Tagore) 1992
- Gora (Rabindranath Tagore's novel Gora) 1997
- Modern Poetry and Sanskriti Kavya (a long essay by Buddhadeb Bose) 1997
