= The Himalayan Arc =

2018 edited volume by Namita Gokhale

The Himalayan Arc: Journeys East of South-East
- Editors: Namita Gokhale
- Language: English
- Subject: Political geography
- Genre: Fiction and Nonfiction
- Published: 2018
- Publisher: HarperCollins Publishers India
- Publication place: India
- Media type: Hardcover
- Pages: 333
- ISBN: 978-9352776115

The Himalayan Arc: Journeys East of South-east is an anthology of fiction and nonfiction edited by Namita Gokhale, with contributions by authors from the region Gokhale has described as "the bend of the Himalayas, the East of South-east, including Nepal, Bhutan, north-east India, and Myanmar."

== Background ==
This book, with more than thirty authors contributing to it, is an attempt to depict the sense of shared existence and cultural connectivity between the people residing in the Himalayan region. Along with photos, fables, and folk stories, it features articles on topics such as strategy and diplomacy, espionage, and the deep state.

=== List of contributors ===
- Janice Pariat
- Salil Tripathi
- Ma Thida
- Indra Bahadur Rai
- Prajwal Parajuly
- David Malone (independent filmmaker)
- Chetan Raj Shrestha
- Kanak Mani Dixit
- Sujeev Shakya
- Pushpesh Pant
- John Elliott (historian)
- Amish Raj Mulmi
- Thomas Bell
- Sushma Joshi
- Sanjoy Hazarika
- Sudhindra Sharma
- Tsering Tashi
- Abhay K.
- Manoj Joshi (journalist)
- Catherine Anderson
- Andrew Duff
- Binodini
- Jacqueline Zote
- Aruni Kashyap
- Sameer Tanti
- Nitoo Das
- Lutfa Hanum Selima Begum
- Uddipana Goswami
- Robin Ngangom
- Akhu Chingangbam
- Indira Goswami
- Andrew Selth
- Tulsi Badrinath
- Meghna Pant
- Mamang Dai
- Desmond Kharmawphlang

== Reception ==
In his review for The Hindu, Bangladeshi journalist Abdus Salam writes, "The volume ticks all boxes, covering most of the region, opening with Nepal and going all the way to Myanmar. There’s even poetry and colonial-era photographs thrown in. But in the absence of an overarching theme other than geography, the information is discrete and unconnected, an assemblage of vignettes that doesn’t add up to a big picture."

Prannay Pathak of the Hindustan Times writes, "The book is an unprecedented attempt to shed a geopolitical light on a stretch of land, a region that has so far been imagined as having a curiously singular identity, which ceases to exist beyond political borders. However, experiences from the arc transcend any sort of boundaries, and change of culture, practices, beliefs, and language is fluid."

Writing for Outlook Traveller, Vivek Mukherji in his review suggests that the book, "Despite the vastly different subcultures tucked within the folds of the Himalayan ranges, the book is a testament to the interconnectedness of its many warm communities." In a review published in The News Lens, Omair Ahmad writes, "These histories have largely been forgotten in favor of the lines drawn on the map by the British Empire and its successors, but they have re-emerged, and have to be understood, if we are to understand the complex political geography of the region."
