= Rig-Veda-Sanhita, The Sacred Hymns Of The Brahmans =

Critical edition by Max Müller

Rig-Veda-Sanhita, The Sacred Hymns of the Brahmans is an edition of the Rigveda together with the commentary of Sayanacarya (died 1387). It was compiled and critically edited by German-British scholar F. Max Müller in six volumes. It was published in six volumes by W. H. Allen & Co., London, with the support of the East India Company. The six volumes came out from 1849 to 1874. Since the first edition, numerous revised editions have been printed from time to time, in India as well as abroad.

== See also ==
- Horace Hayman Wilson
- Samaveda
- Yajurveda
- Atharvaveda
