= Manindra Ray =

Bengali poet (1919–2000)

- মনীন্দ্র রায়
- Born: 4 October 1919; Pabna, Bengal Presidency, British India (now in Bangladesh)
- Died: 28 August 2000 (aged 80); Kolkata, West Bengal, India
- Education: Surendranath College
- Occupations: Writer, poet, author
- Parent(s): Shachandra Ray (Father), Subhasini Devi (Mother)
- Awards: Sahitya Academy Award (1969); Rabindra Puraskar (1993)

Manindra Ray (4 October 1919 – 28 August 2000) was an Indian Bengali poet and editor.

== Career ==
Ray was born in Sitlai village in Pabna District in British India. His parents are Shachandra Ray and Subhasini Devi. Ray studied in Surendranath College, Kolkata and attracted to communism. His first book of poems Trishanku was published in 1939. Ray edited a number of little magazines. He was awarded Sahitya Akademi Award for his poetry 'Mohini Aral' in 1969. In 1993, he was awarded the Rabindra Puraskar for his book 'Sonnet Samagra'. Ray was the co-editor of a Weekly literary magazine Amrita.

== See also ==
- List of Sahitya Akademi Award winners for Bengali
