= Things to Leave Behind =

2016 novel by Namita Gokhale

- First edition
- Language: English
- Genre: Historical
- Publisher: Penguin Random House India
- Publication date: July 2016
- Publication place: India

Things to Leave Behind is a historical novel written by Namita Gokhale. It was published in 2016 by Penguin Random House India.

== Reception ==
The Hindustan Times wrote in a review "Gokhale’s narrative is carefully researched and the events leading up to 1857 and shortly after deftly presented, human interest and suspense mingling with factual chronology."

The Free Press Journal wrote in a review "Ms. Gokhale did some deep and pretty thorough research of the territory, its period in history, its people and their belief in caste, religion and customs."

The Hindu wrote in a review "Desire and asceticism are two opposing forces that power Namita Gokhale’s latest novel Things To Leave Behind."
