= Shadow from Ladakh =

1966 novel by Bhabani Bhattacharya

- First edition
- Author: Bhabani Bhattacharya
- Publisher: Crown Publishers
- Publication date: 1966
- Publication place: India
- Media type: Print
- OCLC: 1856747
- Dewey Decimal: 823
- LC Class: PZ3.B46978 PR9499.3.B45

Shadow from Ladakh is a novel by Bhabani Bhattacharya first published in 1966 by Crown Publishers. The book is set with the Sino-Indian War as a backdrop and tackles various issues include China's presence in Tibet as well the more local social and moral elements of life. The mixture of humour and interactions of the characters in a war setting provides the novel a nuanced approach.

The book won the Sahitya Akademi Award in 1967.

== Bibliography ==
- Mohan, Ramesh; Narayan, Shyamala (2004). "Awards (India)". In Eugene Benson (ed.). Encyclopedia of Post-Colonial Literatures in English. Routledge. ISBN 9780203484326. OCLC 874157271.
- Nagpal, B. R. (1992). Mohan Lal (ed.). Encyclopaedia of Indian Literature: Sasay to Zorgot. Vol. 5. Sahitya Akademi. ISBN 9788126012213.
- Mukherjee, C. M. (2004). "Issues and Themes in the Novels of Bhabani Bhattacharya". In N. D. R. Chandra (ed.). Modern Indian Writing in English: Critical Perceptions. Sarup & Sons. ISBN 9788176253765.
