= Arun Joshi =

Indian writer

- Born: 1939; Varanasi, Uttar Pradesh
- Died: 1993 (aged 53–54)
- Citizenship: Indian

Arun Joshi (1939–1993) was an Indian writer. He is known for his novels The Strange Case of Billy Biswas and The Apprentice. He won the Sahitya Akademi Award for his novel The Last Labyrinth in 1982. His novels have characters who are urban, English speaking and disturbed for some reason. According to one commentator, "The shallowness of middle class society is not for him a point of rhetoric, intended to show off his own enlightened superiority, but a theme to be explored with actual concern."

== Life ==
Arun Joshi was raised in Varanasi, Uttar Pradesh, where his father A C Joshi was Vice Chancellor of Banaras Hindu University.

On returning to India, he began working at Delhi Cloth & General Mills, North India's first textile factory and among the earliest joint-stock companies of the country, as chief of its recruitment and training department. He married Rukmini Lal, a daughter of a shareholder. He resigned from D.C.M. in 1965 while continuing to be the executive director of Shri Ram Centre for Industrial Relations and Human Resources in Delhi.

Joshi lived a reclusive life and generally avoided publicity.

== The Foreigner ==
The Foreigner was published in 1968.

== The Strange Case of Billy Biswas ==
The Strange Case of Billy Biswas was written in 1971 and tells the story of a US returned Indian named Billy Biswas.

== Works ==
=== Novels ===
- The Foreigner, 1968
- The Strange Case of Billy Biswas, 1971
- The Apprentice, 1974
- The Last Labyrinth, 1981
- The City and the River, 1990

=== Short stories ===
- The Survivor and Other Stories, 1975.
- The Only American From Our Village.
- The Boy With The Flute.
- The Homecoming.

=== Other ===
- Shri Ram: A Biography, with Khushwant Singh, 1968.
- Laia Shri Ram: A Study in Entrepreneurship and Industrial Management, 1975.

== See also ==
- List of Indian writers
