= An Artist in Life =

- Author: Niharranjan Ray
- Publisher: University of Kerala
- Publication date: 1967
- Publication place: India
- Media type: Print
- OCLC: 172736
- LC Class: PK1725 .R34

An Artist in Life is a biography of Rabindranath Tagore first published in 1967 by the University of Kerala. The book, written by Niharranjan Ray took 15 years to research and publish. The biography also presents a critical study of all Tagore's works.

It almost took 15 years of planning for the author to come up with the first draft of the book that was published in University of Kerala in 1967.

The book won the Sahitya Akademi Award in 1969.

== Bibliography ==
- Mohan, Ramesh; Narayan, Shyamala (2004). "Awards (India)". In Eugene Benson; LW Conolly (eds.). Encyclopedia of Post-Colonial Literatures in English. Routledge. ISBN 9780203484326. OCLC 874157271.
- Ghosh, Sachindra Lal (1969). "Rabindranath: An Artist in Life". The Indo-Asian Culture. 18. Indian Council for Cultural Relations.
- Hay, Stephen N. (1970). "Book Reviews: An Artist in Life: A Commentary on the Life and Works of Rabindranath Tagore". The Journal of Asian Studies. 29 (4): 972–974. doi:10.2307/2943151. JSTOR 2943151. S2CID 164160692.
- Schwartzberg, Joseph E. (1970). "An Artist in Life: A Commentary on the Life and Works of Rabindranath Tagore". The Journal of Asian Studies. 29 (3–4).
