= Namita Gokhale =

Indian writer (born 1956)

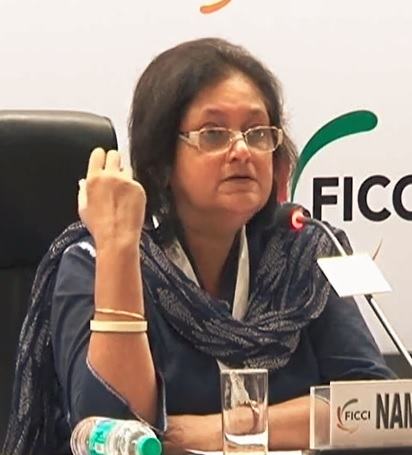
- Namita Gokhale
- Born: 1956 (age 69–70); Lucknow, Uttar Pradesh, India
- Occupations: Writer, Editor, Festival Director, Publisher
- Website: www.namitagokhale.in

Namita Gokhale (born 1956) is an Indian fiction writer, editor, festival director, and publisher. Her debut novel, Paro: Dreams of Passion was released in 1984, and she has since written fiction and nonfiction, and edited nonfiction collections. She conceptualized and hosted the Doordarshan show Kitaabnama: Books and Beyond and is a founder and co-director of the Jaipur Literature Festival. She won the 2021 Sahitya Akademi Award for her novel 'Things to leave behind'.

== Early life and education ==
Gokhale was born in Lucknow, Uttar Pradesh, in 1956. She was raised in Nainital by her aunts and her grandmother Shakuntala Pande. She studied English literature Jesus and Mary College at Delhi University, and at age 18 married Rajiv Gokhale and had two daughters while she was a student. She refused to attend a course about the writings of Geoffrey Chaucer, and was dismissed from university by age 26. By age forty, she had survived cancer and her husband had died.

== Career ==
While a student, at age 17, Gokhale began editing and managing the 1970s-era film magazine Super, and continued publishing the magazine for seven years, until it closed in the early 1980s. After Super closed, she began writing the story that became her debut novel.

In addition to her writing career, Gokhale hosted a hundred episodes of Kitaabnama: Books and Beyond, a multilingual book-show she conceptualized for Doordarshan. According to Raksha Kumar, writing for The Hindu in 2013, "Kitaabnama tries to showcase the multilingual diversity of Indian literature by inviting laureates from different languages to talk about their work. It reminds one of the times when book stores were not overwhelmed by technical writing and self-help books; when literature and quality writing were not considered a waste of time; when the pleasure of reading was experienced by many."

Gokhale is also a founder and co-director of the Jaipur Literature Festival, along with William Dalrymple and Sanjoy K Roy. She was also an advisor to the 'Mountain Echoes' literary festival in Bhutan. She conceptualised the 'International Festival of Indian Literature-Neemrana' 2002, and 'The Africa Asia Literary Conference', 2006. Gokhale also advises The Himalayan Echo Kumaon Festival for Arts and Literature or the Abbotsford Literary Weekend.

From 2010 through 2012, she traveled and conducted administrative work as a committee member of Indian Literature Abroad (ILA), an initiative by the Ministry of Culture, Government of India, for a project intended to translate contemporary literature from Indian languages into the eight UNESCO languages, but after funding was not provided by the government, she shifted her efforts to work with Jaipur Bookmark, the publishing imprint of the Jaipur Literature Festival.

She is also the co-founder-director of Yatra Books, established in 2005 with Neeta Gupta, a multilingual publishing company specialising in creative writing and translations in English, Hindi and Indian regional languages.

== Influences ==
In a 2017 interview with R Krithika of The Hindu, Gokhale described the influences on her writing as "very insidious things. Books and ideas can trigger responses that take a long time to come to fruition." She named The Tale of Genji as a major influence, and listed "Tolstoy, Dostoyevsky, Muriel Spark, Kalidasa." In 1998, Nalini Ganguly writes for India Today, "All of her work seems to be stuck with her personality as a Kumaoni Brahmin girl," and quotes Gokhale, "My way of looking at the world remains trapped in that primary identity; once you start loving the hills they hold on to you." In 2010, Nita Sathyendran writes for The Hindu, "The author is also "deeply fascinated" by Indian mythology, with a lot of her books inspired by its tales and characters. It has also led her to writing books such as The Book of Shiva (on Shaivaite philosophy) and an illustrated version of the Mahabharata for children."

== Critical reception ==
According to Harmony Magazine, Gokhale "burst upon the literary scene in 1984 with a rather unconventional but sparkling social satire, Paro: Dreams of Passion, which swirled around the cocktail circuit of Delhi, capturing the shenanigans of Page 3 celebs, long before the term was even coined." Somak Ghoshal, writing for Mint in 2014, described the novel as "A chronicle of the debauched existence of the rich and famous in Bombay (now Mumbai) and Delhi," that "invoked horror and outrage when it first appeared in India. Few seemed to have got its uproarious humour," and "If Indian parents forbade their children to touch the book, the reaction in the West was quite the opposite, where it was received as a work of literary, rather than pulp, fiction." According to the Press Trust of India in 2020, it "has remained a cult classic." It was later re-issued as the double edition Double Bill: Priya and Paro in 2018, with the 2011 sequel Priya: In Incredible Indyaa, described by Paro Anand, writing for Outlook in 2011, as a "racy read" and by Somak Ghoshal, writing for Mint in 2014, as "not as well received" as Paro. A review of Priya by Kishwar Desai for India Today states, "Written in the same sparkling Hinglish style which had lent Paro its humourous [sic] appeal, Priya's escapades are probably not as scandalous as her baate noire's were. But Gokhale's acerbic touch has not deserted her." In a 2011 review for The Hindu, Sravasti Datta writes Priya "intrigues but doesn't shock. Why? Because sexual frankness is everywhere, be it in books or films."

In 1994, Gokhale published Gods Graves and Grandmother, described by Subhash K Jha of India Today as "remarkable on two counts. First, its structure of a modern fable held aloft by the gauziest of irony. And second, its searching scan of life in the downwardly mobile class of the Indian metropolises migrants who, by emotional and pecuniary manipulation, get rich quick, breaching the bastion of the bourgeois class as a casual enterprise." It was later adapted into a musical play.

In 1998, Gokhale published the nonfiction Mountain Echoes: Reminiscences of Kumaoni Women, a book of oral biography, that explores the Kumaoni way of life through the lives of four women: her aunt Shivani, the Hindi novelist, her grandmother Shakuntala Pande, Tara Pande and Jeeya (Laxmi Pande), which was one of several of her works described by Nita Sathyendran, writing for The Hindu in 2010, that "narrate tales of strong women."

Gokhale edited the 2014 book Travelling In, Travelling Out, described by Danielle Pagani in The Hindu as an essay collection that "take the reader from Asia to America and Europe, discovering situations and different ways to travel. Every author shares his or her personal experience and the stories are very different from each other — from unusual encounters with Maoist guerrillas in the jungle to Western cities and difficulties encountered there by immigrants," and "Although rich in detail, some of the stories are short, leaving the readers wanting more."

Her novel Things to Leave Behind was published in November 2016. Shahnaz Siganporia writes for Vogue India, "Veteran publisher, prolific author, founder-director of the Jaipur Literary Festival and advisor to Mountain Echoes in Bhutan—Namita Gokhale's latest novel is considered her most ambitious yet." Rakhshanda Jalil writes for Scroll.in, "Things To Leave Behind is the third in her trilogy of books on the Himalayas, coming after The Book of Shadows and A Himalayan Love Story. As in the previous books, once again she demonstrates her strength in painting the most vivid pictures of the hills and dales in and around Naineetal and Almora. Her eye for the small details coupled with her near-photographic memory for the sights and sounds she imbibed as a child and the stories she heard from her grandmother and grand-aunts help in creating a virtual tableau before the reader's inward eye." In a review by Ravi Shankar Etteth of The New Indian Express, Gokhale is described as writing with "chutzpah, imagination and leaps of faith taken in the ordinary pursuit of the extraordinary." Shreya Roy Chowdhury writes for The Times of India that the novel is the "third in a series set in the Kumaon hills between 1840 and 1912," and that the "experiences of Gokhale's own family, especially its women members, have informed her stories." In a review for Kitaab, Dr. Pallavi Narayan writes, "the author seems to be pointing to the patriarchal functioning of much of society—documenting the histories of men while conveniently absenting the women, or portraying them as shadow figures. But what the novel is primarily about is the tussle of women with their dependence on men, and how this frames a woman's identity within that of the man "taking care" of her at the moment." Annie Zaidi writes in a review for Mint, "The novel moves at a brisk trot, with the result that the drama inherent in the lives of these characters is rather underplayed. [...] Gokhale's light touch also masks her more serious musings upon the painful clamp of caste and religion, the lack of education and independent property, and how these negative forces narrowed lives in ways that could break a woman's spirit, or declaw a spirited one."

Her first YA fiction book Lost in Time was published in 2017, and described by R Krithika of The Hindu as "a lovely tale of time travel, friendship, loss and love."

Gokhale edited the 2017 anthology of prose and poetry The Himalayan Arc: Journeys East of South-east, featuring work by 28 authors from the region Gokhale described as "the bend of the Himalayas, the East of South-east, including Nepal, Bhutan, north-east India, and Myanmar." In a review published in The News Lens, Omair Ahmad writes, "These histories have largely been forgotten in favor of the lines drawn on the map by the British Empire and its successors, but they have re-emerged, and have to be understood, if we are to understand the complex political geography of the region."

Her 2020 novel Jaipur Journals features the Jaipur Literature Festival. Aishwarya Sahasrabudhe writes for Firstpost, "we are taken in five days through the lives of some interesting characters who are in one capacity or another part of what is often referred to as the Kumbh Mela of Literature, the Jaipur Literature Festival." Pragya Tiwari writes in a review for Scroll.in, "Gokhale achieves the impossible by going beyond approximating the alchemy of the festival and leading us to its beating heart. The point of the festival is to keep asking repeatedly, like the heart beats – what does it mean to be a writer?"

== Works ==
=== Fiction ===
- Paro: Dreams of Passion, 1984
- Gods, Graves, and Grandmother, 1994
- A Himalayan Love Story, 1996
- The Book of Shadows, 1999
- Shakuntala: The Play of Memory, 2005
- Priya: In Incredible Indyaa, 2011
- The Habit of Love, 2012
- Things to Leave Behind, 2016
- Lost in Time: Ghatotkacha and the Game of Illusions, 2017
- Betrayed by Hope : A Play on the Life of Michael Madhusudan Dutt (co-authored with Malashri Lal), 2020
- The Blind Matriarch, published in 2021

=== Non-fiction ===
- Mountain Echoes – Reminiscences of Kumaoni Women, 1994
- The Book of Shiva, 2000
- The Puffin Mahabharata, 2009
- In Search of Sita(co-edited with Malashri Lal), 2009
- Travelling In, Travelling Out (edited), 2014
- Himalaya: Adventures, Meditations, Life(co-edited with Ruskin Bond), 2016
- The Himalayan Arc: Journeys East of South-east (edited), 2018
- Finding Radha: The Quest for Love, 2018

== Honors and awards ==
- 2017 Centenary National Award for Literature from the Asam Sahitya Sabha
- 2017 Valley of Words Book Award, Best English Fiction (Things to Leave Behind)
- 2018 International Dublin Literary Award long list (Things to Leave Behind)
- 2019 Sushila Devi Literature Award, 'Best Book of Fiction Written by a Woman Author' (Things to Leave Behind)
- 2021 7th Yamin Hazarika Woman of Substance Award
- 2021 Sahitya Akademi Award for Things to Leave Behind
