= Sarat Kumar Mukhopadhyay =

Indian Bengali poet (1931–2021)

Sarat Kumar Mukhopadhay
- Born: 15 August 1931; Puri, Bihar and Orissa Province, British India
- Died: 21 December 2021 (aged 90); Kolkata, West Bengal, India
- Education: University of Calcutta
- Occupations: Writer, poet, author
- Writing career
- Notable awards: Sahitya Academy Award (2008)
- Literary movement: Krittibas

Sarat Kumar Mukhopadhyay (15 August 1931 – 21 December 2021) was an Indian Bengali poet, translator and novelist.

== Life and career ==
Sarat Kumar Mukhopadhyay was born in Puri, Bihar and Orissa Province (British India), on 15 August 1931. He graduated from the Calcutta University and became a Chartered Accountant from the Institute of Chartered Accountants of India (ICAI). He continued with his professional studies and became a holder of the Company Secretary certificate from the Institute of Company Secretaries of India (ICSI). He took a break from his working life and went on to study management from the British Institute of Management in Glasgow (United Kingdom). His first book of poetry, Sonar Harin (The Golden Deer) was published in 1957. He was one of the four post-Modernist legendary poets of Krittibas magazine of Kolkata. His first novel Sahabas was published in the Desh and at that time the novel created a lot of controversy among the readers about wife-swapping. He worked as a counsellor in the Creative Writing Programme of the Indira Gandhi National Open University. In 2008 Mukhopadhyay received the Sahitya Akademi Award for his book Ghumer Borir Moto Chand. An anthology of his poems was translated to English by Robert McNamara as The Cat Under the Stairs. He died of a cardiac arrest in the early hours of 21 December 2021, at the age of 90.
