= Shesh Namaskar =

1971 Bengali novel by Santosh Kumar Ghosh

- Cover of English translation; 2013
- Author: Santosh Kumar Ghosh
- Original title: শেষ নমস্কার
- Translator: Ketaki Datta
- Language: Bengali
- Genre: Epistolary novel
- Publisher: Dey's Publishing, Sahitya Akademi
- Publication date: 1971
- Publication place: India
- English publication date: 2013
- Awards: Sahitya Akademi Award (1972)
- OCLC: 859170615
- Dewey Decimal: 891.44371
- LC Class: PK1718.G477

Shesh Namaskar (pronounced [ʃeʃ nʌmskɑːr]) (The Last Salute) is a 1971, Indian, Bengali-language novel that was written by Santosh Kumar Ghosh. The novel, which is considered to be its author's magnum opus, is written in the form of a series of letters from a son to his deceased mother. It won the Sahitya Akademi Award in 1972.

== Publication ==
Shesh Namaskar, which is subtitled Shricharaneshu Make (transl. To my respected Mother), was first published in 1971 by Dey's Publishing.

Being a confessional narrative, the novel is written in the form of a series of letters from a son to his mother, who has died. Through these letters, the narrator seeks forgiveness from his mother just before his death, telling the story using the second-person narrative technique. The author tries to concentrate on self-analysis and his search for the meaning of life and of death through a confessional self-projection into the narrator's persona.

== Characters ==
The principle characters of the novel:

- The narrator
- Pranab – narrator's father, an unsuccessful playwright
- Tanu – narrator's mother
- Sudhirmama (lit. Sudhir Uncle) – Tanu's friend
- Rajani – an almost blind girl

== Synopsis ==
Because the author does not want to be dependent on an abundance of events, he selects a few events, observes them poignantly and analyses them with meticulous care. As a result, Shesh Namaskar does not have an overt plot or a sustained story-telling style.

The novel starts with a letter from a son to his mother, Tanu, followed with another such letter each week. At the end of the novel, the narrator realizes the search for the mother is endless and that perhaps every son searches for his mother and with her, the supreme spirit. The novel ends with the narrator asking whether this search ever ends. The story develops through the letters using flashbacks. Each character reveals a story in their statements.

== Reception ==
Shesh Namaskar received the Sahitya Akademi Award in 1972. A translation into English by Ketaki Datta was published in 2013. For its profound sensibility and realistic depiction, the novel is considered an outstanding contribution to Bengali literature.

Subhash Chandra Sarker praised Shesh Namaskar for its "remarkable use of Bengali language" and its "ability to make a vivid presentation of [a] complicated scene with the most common words". Critic Amalendu Bose highlighted the use of technique and "remarkable" quality.
