= Rama Mehta =

Indian sociologist and writer

- Born: Rama Mehta; 1923
- Died: 1978 (aged 54–55)

Rama Mehta (1923–1978) was an Indian sociologist and writer who is remembered above all for her novel Inside the Haveli (1977). The book won the Sahitya Akademi Award for English-language works in 1979.

== Works ==
Her earlier works include Ramu, A Story of India (1966) and The Life of Keshaw (1969). Both emphasize the importance of education for boys. Ramu does not appreciate the sacrifices his parents have made for him until he sees their heartfelt disappointment after he misses a day at school in order to go to the fair.

Mehta's critical essay The Western Educated Hindu Woman (1970) describes the contrast between women in their twenties at the time of independence who were well educated and spoke English and their mothers who spoke no English and remained devout Hindus bent on maintaining traditions. Her The Hindu Divorced Woman (1975) brings out the disadvantages of a woman's acceptance of divorce which she may well live to regret.
