= Inside the Haveli =

Novel by Rama Mehta

- First edition
- Author: Rama Mehta
- Language: English
- Genre: Novel
- Publisher: Arnold-Heinemann
- Publication date: 1977
- Media type: print
- Awards: Sahitya Academy Award

Inside the Haveli is an English-language novel written by Rama Mehta. For this novel Mehta was conferred Sahitya Akademi Award in 1979. The story of the novel revolved around a young girl from Mumbai, India. She marries a son of a former Indian prince and post-marriage she relocates to Udaipur, Rajasthan.

The novel was translated into Gujarati by Anila Dalal as Havelini Andar (2003).

This novel is also in syllabus of RBSE class 12 English literature as second book.
