= Stephen G. Alter =

American academic

Stephen G. Alter is professor of History at Gordon College, Wenham. Alter received his B.M. from Southern Methodist University, M.A. from Rice University and Ph.D. from University of Michigan.

His 2005 work published from the Johns Hopkins University Press is the first "full-length study" of William Dwight Whitney.

== Bibliography ==
- Stephen G. Alter (14 June 2002). Darwinism and the Linguistic Image: Language, Race, and Natural Theology in the Nineteenth Century. Johns Hopkins University Press. ISBN 978-0-8018-7244-0.
- Stephen G. Alter (9 March 2005). William Dwight Whitney and the Science of Language. Johns Hopkins University Press. ISBN 978-0-8018-8020-9.
