= The Last Labyrinth =

Novel by Indian writer Arun Joshi

- Author: Arun Joshi
- Language: English
- Genre: Novel
- Publication date: 1981
- Media type: print
- Awards: Sahitya Akademi Award

The Last Labyrinth is an English-language novel written by Arun Joshi. The book was first published in 1981, and for the book Joshi was awarded Sahitya Akademi Award in 1982.
