= The Perishable Empire =

- Author: Meenakshi Mukherjee
- Language: English
- Genre: Essays
- Publisher: Oxford University Press
- Media type: print
- Awards: Sahitya Akademi Award (2003)

The Perishable Empire or The Perishable Empire: Essays on Indian Writing in English is an English-language collection of essays written by Meenakshi Mukherjee . The book was first published in 2001 by Oxford University Press and was awarded Sahitya Akademi Award in 2003.
