= Meenakshi Mukherjee =

Litterateur

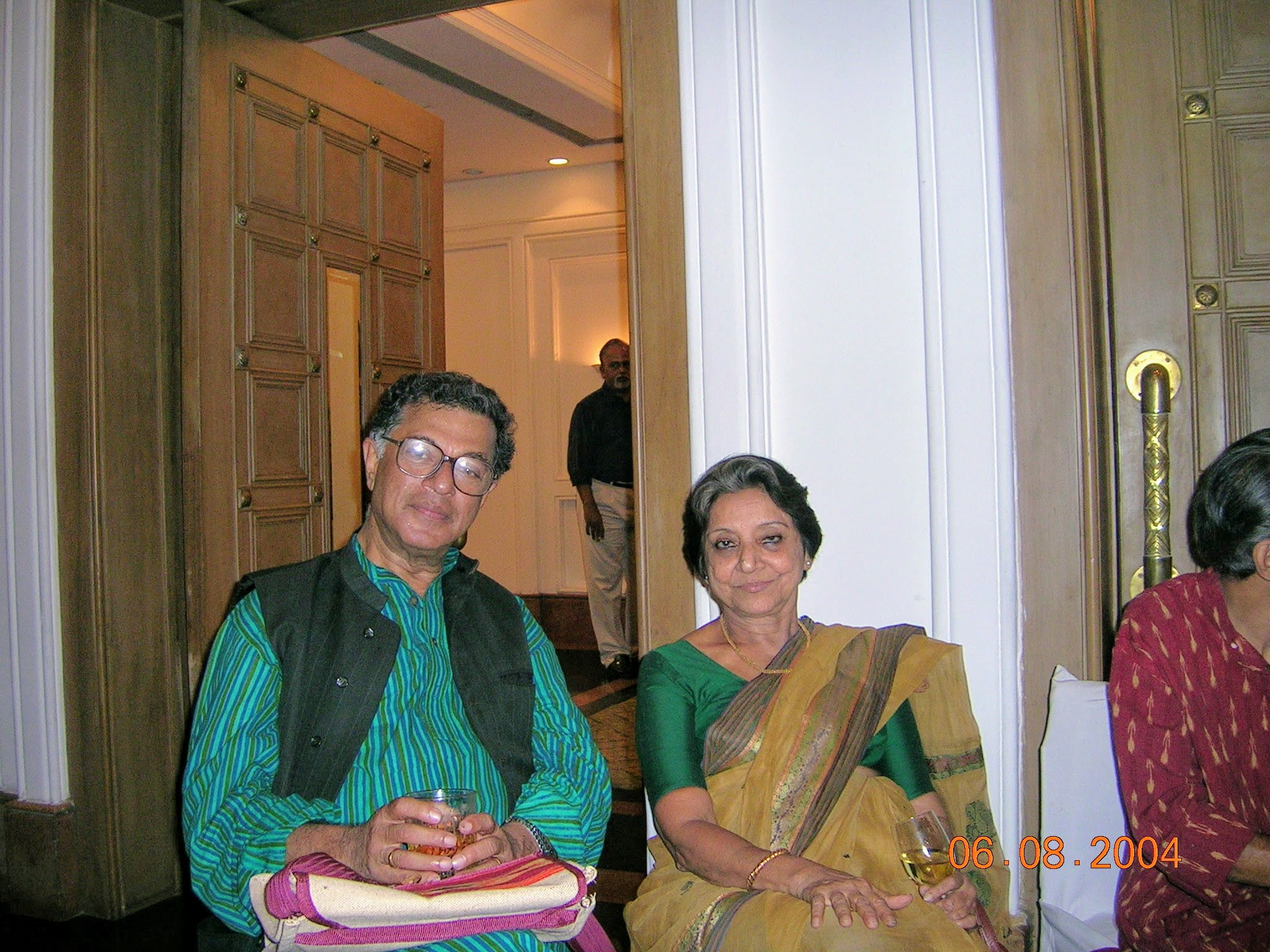
Girish Karnad (left) and Meenakshi Mukherjee, ACLALS Conference 2004, Hyderabad, India

Meenakshi Mukherjee (died 16 September 2009, aged 72) was a litterateur and Sahitya Akademi Award winner.

== Early life ==
Her book, "An Indian for all seasons", a biography of historian R.C. Dutt, published by Penguin, was to be released in Delhi. Mukherjee received the Sahitya Akademi award in 2003 for her book The Perishable Empire: Essays on Indian Writing in English. She taught English literature and Critical theory at several colleges in Patna, Pune, Delhi and University of Hyderabad. Her last and longest spell was as Professor of English in the Jawaharlal Nehru University, New Delhi. She was a visiting professor in several universities outside India, including the University of Texas at Austin, the University of Chicago, the University of California at Berkeley, Macquarie University (Sydney), the University of Canberra and Flinders University (Adelaide).

Her husband Sujit Mukherjee, was a teacher and a literary scholar. They had two daughters. They lived the final years of their lives in Hyderabad.
