= Memories of Rain =

Book by Sunetra Gupta

- Author: Sunetra Gupta
- Language: English
- Published: 1 April 1992
- Publication place: India
- Media type: print
- Pages: 256

Memories of Rain is an English-language book written by Sunetra Gupta. This was Gupta's debut novel and was first published in 1992. The book was awarded Sahitya Akademi Award in 1996.
