= Niharranjan Ray =

Indian historian (1903–1981)

- Born: 14 January 1903; Mymensingh, Bengal, British India
- Died: 30 August 1981 (aged 78); Kolkata, West Bengal, India
- Education: Murari Chand College; University of Calcutta; London University College
- Occupation: Historian
- Children: 3

Niharranjan Ray (14 January 1903 – 30 August 1981) was an Indian Bengali historian, well known for his works on the history of art and Indian history.

== Early life and education ==
He was born on 14 January 1903 in Kayetgram village of Mymensingh District in Bengal province of British India (in the present-day Bangladesh). He completed his initial studies at the Mrityunjaya School and Ananda Mohan College in Mymensingh. In 1924, he passed his B.A. examination in History from Murari Chand College, Sylhet. In 1926, he stood first in the M.A. examination in Ancient Indian History and Culture from the University of Calcutta. He received the Mrinalini Gold Medal in the same year for his Political History of Northern India, AD 600-900. In 1928, he received the Premchand Roychand Scholarship. In 1935, he passed his diploma in Librarianship from the London University College. He married Manika and had two sons and one daughter. His son, Pranabranjan Ray, is a historian. He died on 30 August 1981 at the age of 78 in Kolkata, West Bengal.

== Career ==
He was appointed the Chief Librarian in the Central Library of Calcutta University in 1936. In 1946, he was appointed Bageswari Professor of Fine Arts in Calcutta University and retired from the post in 1965. He was the General Secretary of the Asiatic Society, Calcutta from 1949 to 1950. In 1965, he became the First Director of the Indian Institute of Advanced Study, Shimla and remained in office till 1970. He was a member of the Third Pay Commission from 1970 to 1973.

== Political views ==
He was a nationalist and participated in the Quit India movement and was imprisoned from 1943 to 1944.

== Major works ==
His magnum opus in Bengali, Bangalir Itihas: Adiparba (History of the Bengali People: Early Period) was initially published in 1949. Later, an enlarged and revised edition was published by the Saksharata Prakashan in two volumes in 1980.

His other significant works include:

- Brahmanical Gods of Burma (1932)
- Sanskrit Buddhism in Burma (1936)
- Rabindra Sahityer Bhumika (An introduction to the works of Rabindranath Tagore) (1940)
- Theravada Buddhism in Burma (1946)
- An Introduction to the Study of Theravada Buddhism in Burma (1946)
- Maurya and Śuṅga Art (1947) (a revised and enlarged edition of the work was published in 1976 as Maurya and Post-Maurya Art)
- Art in Burma (1954)
- An Artist in Life; A Commentary on the Life and Works of Rabindranath Tagore (1967)
- Nationalism in India (1972)
- Idea and Image in Indian Art (1973)
- An Approach to Indian Art (1974)
- Mughal Court Painting: A Study in Social and Formal Analysis (1974)
- The Sikh Gurus and the Sikh Society (1975)
- Eastern Indian Bronzes (1986)

== Awards and honors ==
- First recipient of the Rabindra Puraskar, West Bengal (for his Bangalir Itihas: Adiparba in 1950).
- Padma Bhushan, 1969.
- Sahitya Akademi award (An Artist in Life).
