= Bhabani Bhattacharya =

Indian writer

- Born: 10 November 1906; Bhagalpur, Bengal Presidency, British India
- Died: 10 October 1988 (aged 81)
- Occupation: Writer
- Writing career
- Period: 20th century

Bhabani Bhattacharya (10 November 1906 – 10 October 1988) was an Indian writer, of Bengali origin, who wrote social-realist fiction. He was born in Bhagalpur, part of the Bengal Presidency in British India. Bhattacharya gained a bachelor's degree from Patna University and a doctorate from the University of London. He returned to India and joined the diplomatic service. Bhattacharya served in the United States, to which country he returned as a teacher of literary studies once he had left the service. He taught in Hawaii and later in Seattle. In his mid-thirties, Bhattacharya began writing fiction set in historically and socially realistic contexts. He wrote in English, his chosen medium following the advice of two prominent literary figures.

== Personal life ==
Bhattacharya was born in Bhagalpur, part of the Bengal Presidency of British India. His parents were Bengalis. Bhattacharya studied at Patna University and received a bachelor's degree in English literature. He subsequently completed his graduate studies in the United Kingdom. While his original choice was to do so in literature, a hostile attitude from one of the professors prompted him to switch to history. Bhattacharya received Master's (1931) and Doctoral degrees (1934) from the University of London.

As a graduate student, Bhattacharya became involved with Marxist circles and was also strongly influenced by Harold Laski, one of his teachers. He was also active in literary circles and had work published in various magazines and newspapers. Some of Bhattacharya's articles were published in The Spectator, and he developed a friendship with the editor, Francis Yeats-Brown. During this time, Bhattacharya also interacted with Rabindranath Tagore. He translated Tagore's poem The Golden Boat into English in 1930. Both Yeats-Brown and Tagore advised Bhattacharya to write his fiction in English, rather than Bengali.

On completion of his doctoral studies, Bhattacharya moved to Calcutta and soon got married. After a few years, he joined the diplomatic service, serving in the Indian Embassy in Washington, D. C. as a Press Attaché, returning to India after completing that service. Bhattacharya accepted an offer to join the University of Hawaii as visiting faculty, subsequently moving permanently to Seattle to take up a chair at the University of Washington.

== Literary review ==
=== Writing style and reception ===
Bhattacharya is described as belonging to the social realism school of Indo-Anglian literature. His writings exhibit the influence of Rabindranath Tagore and Mahatma Gandhi. Unlike other social realists like Premchand, Bhattacharya adopted a pedagogical approach to making novels out of ideas, utilizing satire and making his ideas more tangible through situational examples.

Among the range of South Indian writers who seem to dominate the scene of 'Gandhian Fiction' Bhabani Bhattacharya deserves to be mentioned for his first novel, 'So Many Hungers'(1947), published few months after Independence. Set in a context of the 1942-43 Bengal famine and Quit India Movement this complicated and didactic novel takes its characters through a rigorously Gandhian education. It is, at one level, the story of Kajoli, a village girl who righteously rejects the prostitution forced on her by the destitution of her family, to sell newspapers and so also to assume the persona of the Gandhian 'New Woman.' At another level, it deals with the spiritual and political growing up of Rahoul, a Cambridge-educated astrophysicist who simultaneously discovers the limits of intellectualism and Western civilization and renounces both in favour of nationalism and avillage-based economy. Much of his instruction comes by way of his grandfather, Devata, a saintly Gandhian figure with a penchant for the hunger strike, who is responsible for bringing satyagraha to the village of Baruni, where he lives like one of the peasants.

=== Awards ===
- Sahitya Akademi Award, 1967

== Notable works ==
- Some Memorable Yesterdays (Pustak Bhandar, 1941)
- So Many Hungers! (Hind Kitabs Limited, 1947)
- Indian Cavalcade (Nalanda Publications, 1948)
- Music for Mohini (Jaico Publishing House, 1952)
- He Who Rides a Tiger (Jaico Publishing House, 1955)
- The Golden Boat (Jaico Publishing House, 1956)
- Towards Universal Man (Visva Bharti Shantiniketan, 1961)
- Shadow from Ladakh (Hind Pocket Books Ltd., 1966)
- A Goddess Named Gold (Hind Pocket Books Ltd., 1967)
- Steel Hawk and Other Stories (Hind Pocket Books Ltd., 1968)
- Gandhi the Writer (National Book Trust, 1969)
- A Dream in Hawaii (The MacMillan Company of India Limited, 1978)
- Socio-Political Currents in Bengal: A Nineteenth Century Perspective (Vikas, 1980)

== Bibliography ==
- Sharma, Kaushal Kishore (1979). Bhabani Bhattacharya, His Vision and Themes (1 ed.). New Delhi, India: Abhinav Publications. ISBN 9780836405842. OCLC 6555357.
- Shimer, Dorothy Blair (1975). Bhabani Bhattacharya. Boston, MA: Twayne Publishers. ISBN 9780805721515. OCLC 1054263.
- Desai, S. K. (1995). Bhabani Bhattacharya. Makers of Indian literature. New Delhi, India: Sahitya Akademi. ISBN 9788172017729. OCLC 34850524.
- Chandrasekharan, K. R. (1974). Bhabani Bhattacharya. Indian Writers Series. Vol. 7. Arnold-Heinemann Publishers. OCLC 1176569.
- Srivastava, Ramesh K (1982). Perspectives on Bhabani Bhattacharya. Indo-English writers series. Vol. 4. Ghaziabad, India: Vimal. OCLC 9732652.
- Gupta, Monika (2002). The novels of Bhabani Bhattacharya. New Delhi, India: Atlantic Publishers & Distributors. ISBN 9788126900794. OCLC 49711417.
- Singh, Kh. Kunjo (2002). The Fiction of Bhabani Bhattacharya. Atlantic Publishers & Distributors. ISBN 9788126901838. OCLC 499823105.
- Desai, S. K. (1985). "Bhabani Bhattacharya: The Writer Who Rides a Tiger". In Madhukar K. Naik (ed.). Perspectives on Indian Fiction in English. Abhinav Publications. ISBN 9788170171997. OCLC 14176283.
