= Scholar Extraordinary =

Book by Nirad C. Chaudhuri

- Author: Nirad C. Chaudhuri
- Publisher: Chatto & Windus
- Publication date: 1974
- Publication place: India
- Media type: Print
- ISBN: 9780701119447
- OCLC: 1184908
- Dewey Decimal: 409.2/4 B
- LC Class: P85.M8 C5

Scholar Extraordinary is a biography of Max Müller published by Chatto & Windus in 1974. The book was written by Nirad C. Chaudhuri. In addition to detailing the life of Müller, Chaudhuri also places in context the social and psychological aspects of the era and handles Müller's actions with that backdrop.

The book won the Sahitya Akademi Award in 1975.

== Bibliography ==
- Mohan, Ramesh; Narayan, Shyamala (2004). "Awards (India)". In Eugene Benson (ed.). Encyclopedia of Post-Colonial Literatures in English. Routledge. ISBN 9780203484326. OCLC 874157271.
- Kulshreshtha, C. M. (1992). Mohan Lal (ed.). Encyclopaedia of Indian Literature: Sasay to Zorgot. Vol. 5. Sahitya Akademi. ISBN 9788126012213.
