= List of Sahitya Akademi Award winners for Marathi =

List of winners of a literary honor in India

Sahitya Akademi Award for Marathi
- Award for contributions to Marathi literature
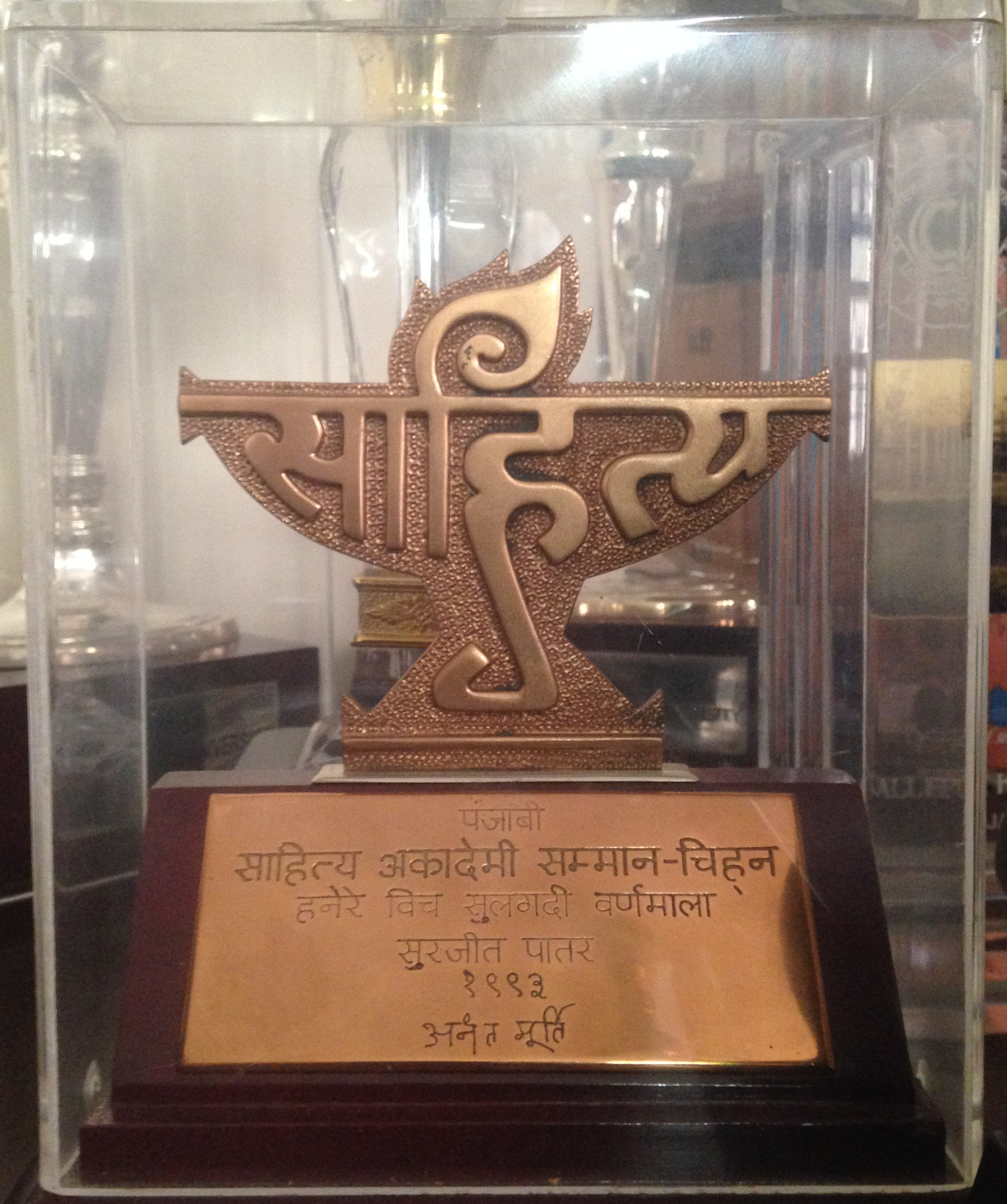
- Awarded for: Literary award in India
- Sponsored by: Sahitya Akademi, Government of India
- Reward: ₹1 lakh (US$1,100)
- First award: 1955
- Final award: 2024

Highlights
- Total awarded: 70
- First winner: Lakshman Shastri Joshi
- Most Recent winner: Sudhir Rasal
- Website: Official website

Part of a series on

Sahitya Akademi Awards
Category
Sahitya Akademi Award winners by language
- Assamese
- Bengali
- Bodo
- Dogri
- English
- Gujarati
- Hindi
- Kannada
- Kashmiri
- Konkani
- Maithili
- Malayalam
- Marathi
- Meitei (Manipuri)
- Nepali
- Odia
- Punjabi
- Rajasthani
- Sanskrit
- Santali
- Sindhi
- Tamil
- Telugu
- Urdu
Sahitya Akademi Translation Prizes
- Assamese
- Bengali
- Bodo
- Dogri
- English
- Gujarati
- Hindi
- Kannada
- Kashmiri
- Konkani
- Maithili
- Malayalam
- Marathi
- Meitei (Manipuri)
- Nepali
- Odia
- Punjabi
- Rajasthani
- Sanskrit
- Santali
- Sindhi
- Tamil
- Telugu
- Urdu
Sahitya Akademi Yuva Puraskar
- Assamese
- Bengali
- Bodo
- Dogri
- English
- Gujarati
- Hindi
- Kannada
- Kashmiri
- Konkani
- Maithili
- Malayalam
- Meitei (Manipuri)
- Marathi
- Nepali
- Odia
- Punjabi
- Rajasthani
- Sanskrit
- Santali
- Sindhi
- Tamil
- Telugu
- Urdu
Sahitya Akademi Bal Sahitya Puraskar
- Assamese
- Bengali
- Bodo
- Dogri
- English
- Gujarati
- Hindi
- Kannada
- Kashmiri
- Konkani
- Maithili
- Malayalam
- Meitei (Manipuri)
- Marathi
- Nepali
- Odia
- Punjabi
- Rajasthani
- Sanskrit
- Santali
- Sindhi
- Tamil
- Telugu
- Urdu
Related
- Eighth Schedule to the Constitution of India
- Official Languages Commission
- List of languages by number of native speakers in India

Sahitya Akademi Award is a literary honour given every year to a Marathi writer by Sahitya Akademi. No Award was conferred in 1957.

== Recipients ==
Following is the list of recipients of Sahitya Akademi Awards for their works written in Marathi. As of 2022, the award consists of an engraved copper plaque, a shawl and prize money of ₹1 lakh (US$1,100).

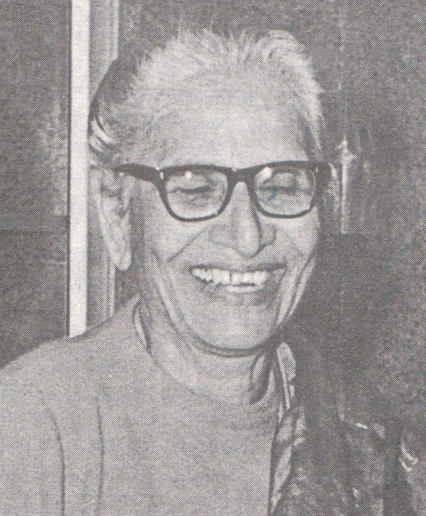
Irawati Karve was the first woman winner of this award.

Year	Author	Work title	Genre	References
1955	Lakshman Shastri Joshi	Vaidik Sanskruticha Vikas	Cultural history	
1956	B. S. Mardhekar	Saundarya Ani Sahitya	A study of Aesthetics	
1957	No Award			
1958	Chintaman Ganesh Kolhatkar	Bahurupee	Autobiography	
1959	G. T. Deshpande	Bharatiya Sahityashastra	A treatise on poetics	
1960	Vishnu Sakharam Khandekar	Yayati	Novel	
1961	D. N. Gokhale	Dr. Ketkar	Biography	
1962	Purushottam Yashwant Deshpande	Anamikachi Chintanika	Philosophical reflections	
1963	Shripad Narayan Pendse	Rathachakra	Novel	
1964	Ranjit Desai	Swami	Novel	
1965	Purushottam Laxman Deshpande	Vyakti Ani Valli	Sketches	
1966	Tryambak Shankar Shejwalkar	Shri Shiv Chhatrapati	Historical research	
1967	Narayan Govind Kalelkar	Bhasha : Itihas Ani Bhoogol	Linguistic study	
1968	Irawati Karve	Yugant	Interpretation of the Mahabharata	
1969	Shrinivas Narayan Banhatti	Natyacharya Deval	Biography	
1970	Narahar Raghunath Phatak	Adarsh Bharat Sevak	Biography	
1971	Durga Bhagwat	Pais	Essays	
1972	Godavari Parulekar	Jevha Manus Jaga Hoto	Autobiography	
1973	G. A. Kulkarni	Kajalmaya	Short Stories	
1974	Kusumagraj	Natasamrat	Play	
1975	R. B. Patankar	Soundarya Mimansa	Aesthetics	
1976	Gopal Nilkanth Dandekar	Smarangatha	Autobiographical Novel	
1977	Atmaram Ravaji Deshpande	Dashapadi	Poetry	
1978	Chintamani Tryambak Khanolkar	Nakshatranche Dene	Poetry	
1979	Sharchchandra Muktibodh	Srushti, Saundarya Ani Sahityamulya	Literary criticism	
1980	Mangesh Padgaonkar	Salaam	Poetry	
1981	Laxman Mane	Upara	Autobiography	
1982	Prabhakar Padhye	Saundaryanubhav	Literary criticism	
1983	Vyankatesh Madgulkar	Sattantar	Novel	
1984	Indira Sant	GarbhaReshami	Poetry	
1985	Vishram Bedekar	Ek Zad Ani Don Pakshi	Autobiography	
1986	Nagorao Ghanashyam Deshpande	Khoon-Gathi	Poetry	
1987	Ramchandra Chintaman Dhere	Shri Vitthal : Ek Mahasamanvay	Literary criticism	
1988	Laxman Gaikwad	Uchalya	Autobiography	
1989	Prabhakar Urdhwareshe	Haravlele Diwas	Autobiography	
1990	Anand Yadav	Zombi	Autobiographical Novel	
1991	Bhalchandra Nemade	Teeka Svayanwar	Criticism	
1992	Vishwas Patil	Zada-Zadati	Novel	
1993	Vijaya Rajadhyaksha	Mardhekaranchi Kavita	Literary criticism	
1994	Dilip Chitre	Ekun Kavita - 1	Poetry	
1995	Namdeo Kamble	Raghawa-Wel	Novel	
1996	Gangadhar Gopal Gadgil	Eka Mungiche Mahabharat	Autobiography	
1997	Madhukar Vasudev Dhond	Dnyaneshwaritil Laukik Srushti	Criticism	
1998	Sadanand More	Tukaram Darshan	Criticism	
1999	Ranganath Pathare	Tamrapat	Novel	
2000	Namdeo Dhondo Mahanor	Panzad	Poetry	
2001	Rajan Gavas	Tanakat	Novel	
2002	Mahesh Elkunchwar	Yugant	Play	
2003	T. V. Sardeshmukh	Dangora Eka Nagaricha	Novel	
2004	Sadanand Deshmukh	Baromas	Novel	
2005	Arun Kolatkar	Bhijaki Vahi	Poetry	
2006	Asha Bage	Bhoomi	Novel	
2007	G. M. Pawar	Charitra: Viththal Ramji Shinde	Biography	
2008	Shyam Manohar	Utsukatene Mee Zopalo	Novel	
2009	Vasant Abaji Dahake	Chitralipi	Poetry	
2010	Ashok Ramchandra Kelkar	Rujuvaat (रूजुवात)	Criticism	
2011	Manik Sitaram Godghate	Varyane Halate Raan	Collection of essays	
2012	Jayant Pawar	Phoenixchya Rakhetun Uthla Mor	Story stories collection	
2013	Satish Kalsekar	Vachanaryachi Rojanishee (वाचणाऱ्याची रोजनिशी)	Collection of essays	
2014	Jayant Narlikar	Chaar Nagranatale Maaze Viswa	Autobiography	
2015	Arun Khopkar	Chalat-Chitravyooh (चलत्-चित्रव्यूह)	Memoirs	
2016	Asaram Lomate	Aalok	Short Stories	
2017	Shrikant Deshmukh	Bolave Te Amhi	Poetry	
2018	Ma. Su. Patil	Sarjanprerana ani Kavitwashodh	Literary Criticism	
2019	Anuradha Patil	"Kadachit Ajoonahi"	Poetry	
2020	Nanda Khare	Udya	Novel	
2021	Kiran Gurav	Baluchya Avasthantarachi Diary	Short stories	
2022	Praveen Dashrath Bandekar	Ujavya Sondechya Bahulya	Novel	
2023	Krishnat Khot	Ringan	Novel	
2024	Sudhir Rasal	Vindanche Gadyaroop	Criticism	
2025	Raju Baviskar	Kalyanilya Resha	Autobiography	
