= List of Sahitya Akademi Translation Prize winners for Gujarati =

List of winners of a literary honor in India

Part of a series on

Sahitya Akademi Awards
Category
Sahitya Akademi Award winners by language
- Assamese
- Bengali
- Bodo
- Dogri
- English
- Gujarati
- Hindi
- Kannada
- Kashmiri
- Konkani
- Maithili
- Malayalam
- Marathi
- Meitei (Manipuri)
- Nepali
- Odia
- Punjabi
- Rajasthani
- Sanskrit
- Santali
- Sindhi
- Tamil
- Telugu
- Urdu
Sahitya Akademi Translation Prizes
- Assamese
- Bengali
- Bodo
- Dogri
- English
- Gujarati
- Hindi
- Kannada
- Kashmiri
- Konkani
- Maithili
- Malayalam
- Marathi
- Meitei (Manipuri)
- Nepali
- Odia
- Punjabi
- Rajasthani
- Sanskrit
- Santali
- Sindhi
- Tamil
- Telugu
- Urdu
Sahitya Akademi Yuva Puraskar
- Assamese
- Bengali
- Bodo
- Dogri
- English
- Gujarati
- Hindi
- Kannada
- Kashmiri
- Konkani
- Maithili
- Malayalam
- Meitei (Manipuri)
- Marathi
- Nepali
- Odia
- Punjabi
- Rajasthani
- Sanskrit
- Santali
- Sindhi
- Tamil
- Telugu
- Urdu
Sahitya Akademi Bal Sahitya Puraskar
- Assamese
- Bengali
- Bodo
- Dogri
- English
- Gujarati
- Hindi
- Kannada
- Kashmiri
- Konkani
- Maithili
- Malayalam
- Meitei (Manipuri)
- Marathi
- Nepali
- Odia
- Punjabi
- Rajasthani
- Sanskrit
- Santali
- Sindhi
- Tamil
- Telugu
- Urdu
Related
- Eighth Schedule to the Constitution of India
- Official Languages Commission
- List of languages by number of native speakers in India

Sahitya Akademi Translation Prizes are given each year to writers for their outstanding translations work in the 24 languages, since 1989.

== Recipients ==
Following is the list of recipients of Sahitya Akademi translation prizes for their works written in Gujarati. The award, as of 2019, consisted of ₹50,000.

Year	Translator	Title of the translation	Original Title	Original Language	Genre	Original Author	Ref.
1989	Nagindas Parekh	Na Hanyate	Na Hanyate	Bengali	Reminiscences	Maitreyi Devi	
1990	Ramanik Meghani	Gandevata	Ganadevata	Bengali	Novel	Tarashankar Bandyopadhyay	
1991	Ramanlal Soni	Kabuliwala	Galpaguchchha	Bengali	Short Stories	Rabindranath Tagore	
1992	Jaya Mehta	Suvarnamudra Ane...	Manasan Arbhat Ani Chillar	Marathi		G. A. Kulkarni	
1993	Anila Dalal	Prachchhanna	Prachchhanna	Bengali	Novel	Bimal Kar	
1994	Suresh Dalal	Manohar Chhe, Topun...	Ahe Manohar Tari	Marathi	Autobiography	Sunita Deshpande	
1995	Pratibha Dave	Mrityunjay	Mrityunjay	Marathi	Novel	Shivaji Sawant	
1996	Chandrakant Mehta	Jeevan Swad	Jeevan Swad	Bengali	Novel	Ashapurna Devi	
1997	Prasad Brahmabhatt	Amritasya Putri	Amritasya Putri	Bengali	Novel	Kamal Das	
1998	Bholabhai Patel	Iyaruingam	Iyaruingam	Assamese	Novel	B.K. Bhattacharyya	
1999	Sukanya Jhaveri	Ekvis Bengali Vartao	Ekushti Bangla Galpa	Bengali	Short Stories	Different Authors	
2000	Usha Sheth	Kosheto	Kosala	Marathi	Novel	Bhalchandra Nemade	
2001	Varsha Das	Shabdonu Akash	Sabdar Akash	Oriya	Poetry	Sitakant Mahapatra	
2002	Shakuntala Mehta	Bhat Bhat Ke Log	Vyakti Aani Valli	Marathi	Biography	P.L. Deshpande	
2003	Renuka Soni	Manoj Dasni Vartao	Collection	Oriya	Short Stories	Manoj Das	
2004	Mahesh Champaklal	Agni Ane Varsad	Agni Mattu Male			Girish Karnad	
2005	Uma Randeria	Nava Yugnu Parodh	Sey Samay	Bengali	Novel	Sunil Gangopadhyay	
2006	Sanjay Shripad Bhave	Upara	Upara	Marathi	Novel	Laxman Mane	
2007	Mohan Dandikar	Pahelo Girmitiyo	Pahala Girmitia	Hindi	Novel	Giriraj Kishore	
2008	Mohandas Patel	Kshitijmohan Sen Ane Ardhsatabdinun Santiniketan	Kshitijmohan Sen O Ardhashatabdira Santiniketan	Bengali	Biography	Pranati Mukhopadhyay	
2009	Ramanik Someshwar	Jalgeet	Jalgeetam	Telugu	Poetry	N. Gopi	
2010	Aruna Jadeja	Pulakit	Selection	Marathi	Essays	P.L. Deshpande	
2011	Darshana Dholakia	Karmelin	Karmelin	Konkani	Novel	Damodar Mauzo	
2012	Shalini Topiwala	Gujarati Sahityanu Anushilan	Studies In Gujarati Literature	English	Criticism	Jahangir Edalji Sanjana	
2013	No Award						
2014	Nageen G. Shah	Tarkarahasyadeepika	Tarkarahasyadeepika	Sanskrit	Essays	Gunaratna Suri	
2015	Sharifa Vijaliwala	Jene Lahor Nathi Joyun E Janmyo J Nathi	Jis Lahore Nahi Dekhya 0 Jamya E Nai	Hindi	Play	Asghar Wajahat	
2016	Shalini Topiwala	Gita Govinda	Gita Govinda	Sanskrit	Poetry	Jaydev	
2017	Harish Meenashru	Hampina Khadako	Evaregina Hilatena Kela	Kannada	Poetry	Chandrashekhara Kambara	
2018	Vinesh Antani	Mayadarpan	Collection	Hindi	Short Stories	Nirmal Verma	
2019	Bakula Ghaswala	Antarnad	The Voice of the Heart	English	Autobiography	Mrinalini Sarabhai	
2020	Kashyapi Maha	Paritapta Lankeshwari	Paritapta Lankeshwari	Hindi	Novel	Mridula Sinha	
2021	Sonal Parikh	Ba: Mahatmani Ardhangini	The Forgotten Woman	English	Biography	Arun Gandhi & Sunanda Gandhi	
2022	Vijay Pandya	Ayodhyakandam	Valmiki Ramayana Ayyodhyakandam	Sanskrit	Epic Poetry	Valmiki	
2023	Minal Dave	Swechcha	Swechcha	Telugu	Novel	P. Lalita Kumari	
2024	Ramnik Agrawat	Kumarjiv	Kumar Jiu	Hindi	Poetry	Kunwar Narayan	

== See also ==
- List of Sahitya Akademi Award winners for Gujarati
