= List of Sahitya Akademi Translation Prize winners for Kannada =

List of winners of a literary honor in India

Part of a series on

Sahitya Akademi Awards
Category
Sahitya Akademi Award winners by language
- Assamese
- Bengali
- Bodo
- Dogri
- English
- Gujarati
- Hindi
- Kannada
- Kashmiri
- Konkani
- Maithili
- Malayalam
- Marathi
- Meitei (Manipuri)
- Nepali
- Odia
- Punjabi
- Rajasthani
- Sanskrit
- Santali
- Sindhi
- Tamil
- Telugu
- Urdu
Sahitya Akademi Translation Prizes
- Assamese
- Bengali
- Bodo
- Dogri
- English
- Gujarati
- Hindi
- Kannada
- Kashmiri
- Konkani
- Maithili
- Malayalam
- Marathi
- Meitei (Manipuri)
- Nepali
- Odia
- Punjabi
- Rajasthani
- Sanskrit
- Santali
- Sindhi
- Tamil
- Telugu
- Urdu
Sahitya Akademi Yuva Puraskar
- Assamese
- Bengali
- Bodo
- Dogri
- English
- Gujarati
- Hindi
- Kannada
- Kashmiri
- Konkani
- Maithili
- Malayalam
- Meitei (Manipuri)
- Marathi
- Nepali
- Odia
- Punjabi
- Rajasthani
- Sanskrit
- Santali
- Sindhi
- Tamil
- Telugu
- Urdu
Sahitya Akademi Bal Sahitya Puraskar
- Assamese
- Bengali
- Bodo
- Dogri
- English
- Gujarati
- Hindi
- Kannada
- Kashmiri
- Konkani
- Maithili
- Malayalam
- Meitei (Manipuri)
- Marathi
- Nepali
- Odia
- Punjabi
- Rajasthani
- Sanskrit
- Santali
- Sindhi
- Tamil
- Telugu
- Urdu
Related
- Eighth Schedule to the Constitution of India
- Official Languages Commission
- List of languages by number of native speakers in India

Sahitya Akademi Translation Prizes are given each year to writers for their outstanding translations work in the 24 languages, since 1989.

== Recipients ==
Following is the list of recipients of Sahitya Akademi translation prizes for their works written in Kannada. The award, as of 2019, consisted of ₹50,000.

Year	Translator	Title of the translation	Original Title	Original Language	Genre	Original Author	References
1990	S.V. Parameshwara Bhatta	Kannada Kalidasa Mahasamputa	Collection of Kalidasa's Works	Sanskrit	Poetry & Drama	Kalidasa	
1991	H. S. Venkateshamurthy	Rithu Vilasa	Ritusamharam	Sanskrit	Poetry	Kalidasa	
1992	Saraswati Gajanan Risbud	Valmiki Ramayana Sapa Mattu Vara	Valmiki Ramayana Sapa Ani Vara	Marathi	Epic	Shripad Raghunath Bhide	
1993	Kirtinath Kurtakoti	Marathi Samskriti: Kelavu Samasyegalu	Marathti Sanskriti	Marathti	Criticism	Sham B. Joshi	
1994	Pradhan Gurudatta	Jaya Yaudheya	Jaya Yaudheya	Hindi	Novel	Rahul Sankrityayan	
1995	Thippeswamy	Nirmala	Nirmala	Hindi	Novel	Premchand	
1996	Seshanarayana	Hadinentaneya Aksharekhe	Padinettavadu Akshakkodu	Tamil	Novel	Ashokamitran	
1997	Neerpaje Beema Bhat	Kalhanana Rajatharangmi (Vol I & II)	Rajatarangini	Sanskrit	Poetry	Kalhana	
1998	C. Raghavan	Indulekha	Indulekha	Malayalam	Novel	O. Chandu Menon	
1999	Vaman D. Bendre	Kosala	Kosala	Marathi	Novel	Bhalchandra Nemade	
2000	L. Basavaraju	Buddha Charite	Buddhacharitam	Sanskrit	Epic	Aswaghosh	
2001	Bannanje Govindacharya	Aaveya Mannina Atada Bandi	Mrcchakatikam	Sanskrit	Play	Shudraka	
2002	Veena Shanteswara	Nadi Dweepagalu	Nadi Ke Dweep	Hindi	Novel	Agyeya	
2003	Snehalata Rohidekar	Vichitra Varna	Bichitra Barna	Odia	Short Stories	Rabi Pattanayak	
2004	Chandrakant M. Pokale	Mahanayaka	Mahanayak	Marathi	Novel	Vishwas Patil	
2005	Panchakshari Hiremath	Hemantha Ruthuvina Swaragalu	Patjhar Ki Awaz	Urdu	Short Stories	Qurratulain Hyder	
2006	R.S. Lokapur	Kannada Jnaneshwari	Jnaneswari	Marathi	Poetry	Jnaneshwar	
2007	R. Lakshminarayana	Kannada Vakrokti	Vakrokti Jivita	Sanskrit	Poetics	Kuntaka Nemade	
2008	Hasan Nayeem Surakoda	Raseedi Tikeetu	Raseedi Ticket	Punjabi	Autobiography	Amrita Pritam	
2009	D.N. Srinath	Bheeshma Sahniyavara Prathinidhika Kathegalu	Bhishma Sahni Ki Kahaniyan	Hindi	Short Stories	Bhisham Sahni	
2010	A. Janaki	Godana	Godan	Hindi	Novel	Premchand	
2011	Tamil Selvi	Naanu Avanalla... Avalu...!	Naan Sharavanan lllai. Vidya	Telugu	Autobiography	Living Smile Vidya	
2012	K.K.Nair & Ashok Kumar	Hagga (Part 1,2,3)	Kayar	Malayalam	Novel	Thakazhi Sivasankara	
2013	J.P. Dodamani	Mahatma Jyotirao Phule	Mahatma Jyotirao Phule	Marathi	Biography	Dhananjay Keer	
2014	G.N. Ranganatha Rao	Mohan Das: Ondu Satya Kathe	Mohan Das - A True Story of A Man, His People and an Empire	English	Biography	Rajmohan Gandhi	
2015	N. Damodara Shetty	Kochereti	Kochereti	Malayalam	Novel	Narayan	
2016	O.L. Nagabhushanaswamy	A.K. Ramanujan Aayda Prabandhagalu	Selected Essays Of A.K. Ramanujan	English	Essays	A. K. Ramanujan	
2017	H.S. Sreemathi	Mahashweta Devi Avara Katha Sahitya-1 & 2	Selected Stories Of Mahashweta Devi	Bengali	Short Stories	Mahasweta Devi	
2018	Giraddi Govindaraj	Jaya : Mahabharatha Sachitra Marukathana	Jaya: Retelling of The Mahabharata	English	Epic	Devdutt Pattanaik	
2019	Dr. Vithalrao T. Gaikwad	Dalita Saahityada Soundarya Prajne	Dalit Sahityache Soundarya Shastra	Marathi	Literary Criticism	Sharankumar Limbale	
2020	S. Nataraja Budalu	Sarahapada	Collections (Works. Philosophy & Dohas)	Apabhraṃśa	Dohas	Sarahapada	
2021	Guruling Kapse	Ondu Putada Kathe	Eka Panachi Kahani	Marathi	Autobiography	V. S. Khandekar	
2022	Padmaraj Dandavati	Sita Ramayanada Sachitra Maru Kathana	Sita - An Illustrated Retelling of Ramayana	English	Fiction	Devdutt Pattanaik	
2023	K. K. Gangadharan	Malayalam Kathegalu	Selected Malayalam Short Stories	Malayalam	Short Stories	Various Authours	
2024	Siddhaling Pattanashetti	Vidisha Prahasana	Mālavikāgnimitram	Sanskrit	Drama	Kalidasa	

== See also ==
- List of Sahitya Akademi Award winners for Kannada
