= List of Yuva Puraskar winners for Santali =

List of winners of a literary honor in India

Part of a series on

Sahitya Akademi Awards
Category
Sahitya Akademi Award winners by language
- Assamese
- Bengali
- Bodo
- Dogri
- English
- Gujarati
- Hindi
- Kannada
- Kashmiri
- Konkani
- Maithili
- Malayalam
- Marathi
- Meitei (Manipuri)
- Nepali
- Odia
- Punjabi
- Rajasthani
- Sanskrit
- Santali
- Sindhi
- Tamil
- Telugu
- Urdu
Sahitya Akademi Translation Prizes
- Assamese
- Bengali
- Bodo
- Dogri
- English
- Gujarati
- Hindi
- Kannada
- Kashmiri
- Konkani
- Maithili
- Malayalam
- Marathi
- Meitei (Manipuri)
- Nepali
- Odia
- Punjabi
- Rajasthani
- Sanskrit
- Santali
- Sindhi
- Tamil
- Telugu
- Urdu
Sahitya Akademi Yuva Puraskar
- Assamese
- Bengali
- Bodo
- Dogri
- English
- Gujarati
- Hindi
- Kannada
- Kashmiri
- Konkani
- Maithili
- Malayalam
- Meitei (Manipuri)
- Marathi
- Nepali
- Odia
- Punjabi
- Rajasthani
- Sanskrit
- Santali
- Sindhi
- Tamil
- Telugu
- Urdu
Sahitya Akademi Bal Sahitya Puraskar
- Assamese
- Bengali
- Bodo
- Dogri
- English
- Gujarati
- Hindi
- Kannada
- Kashmiri
- Konkani
- Maithili
- Malayalam
- Meitei (Manipuri)
- Marathi
- Nepali
- Odia
- Punjabi
- Rajasthani
- Sanskrit
- Santali
- Sindhi
- Tamil
- Telugu
- Urdu
Related
- Eighth Schedule to the Constitution of India
- Official Languages Commission
- List of languages by number of native speakers in India

Yuva Puraskar is given each year to young writers for their outstanding works in the 24 languages, since 2011.

== Recipients ==
Following is the list of recipients of Yuva Puraskar for their works written in Santali. The award comprises a cash prize of Rs. 50,000 and an engraved copper plaque.

Year	Author	Work	Type of Work	Reference
2011	Satilal Murmu	Jagron	Poetry	
2012	Shyam Charan Tudu	Jala Dak	Poetry	
2013	Lalchand Saren	Terang	Short Stories	
2014	Anpa Marndi	Namal	Poetry	
2015	Suchitra Hansda	Bera Ahla	Poetry	
2016	Parimal Hansdah	Dhunwa Otang Ag Kana	Poetry	
2017	Maina Tudu	Marsal Dahar	Poetry	
2018	Rani Murmu	Hopon Mayak Kukmu	Short Stories	
2019	Guhiram Kisku	Jarpi Disomrin Manmi	Poetry	
2020	Anjali Kisku	Anjle	Poetry	
2021	Kuna Hansdah	Sagai Ganade	Novel	
2022	Salge Hansdah	janam Disom ujarog kan	Novel	
2023	Bapi Tudu	Dusi	Short Stories	
2024	Anjan Karmakar	Jangbaha	Poetry	
2025	Fagu Baskey	Ạṛạ são iń	Poetry	

== See also ==
- List of Sahitya Akademi Award winners for Santali
- List of Sahitya Akademi Translation Prize winners for Santali
