= List of Sahitya Akademi Translation Prize winners for Bengali =

List of winners of a literary honor in India

Part of a series on

Sahitya Akademi Awards
Category
Sahitya Akademi Award winners by language
- Assamese
- Bengali
- Bodo
- Dogri
- English
- Gujarati
- Hindi
- Kannada
- Kashmiri
- Konkani
- Maithili
- Malayalam
- Marathi
- Meitei (Manipuri)
- Nepali
- Odia
- Punjabi
- Rajasthani
- Sanskrit
- Santali
- Sindhi
- Tamil
- Telugu
- Urdu
Sahitya Akademi Translation Prizes
- Assamese
- Bengali
- Bodo
- Dogri
- English
- Gujarati
- Hindi
- Kannada
- Kashmiri
- Konkani
- Maithili
- Malayalam
- Marathi
- Meitei (Manipuri)
- Nepali
- Odia
- Punjabi
- Rajasthani
- Sanskrit
- Santali
- Sindhi
- Tamil
- Telugu
- Urdu
Sahitya Akademi Yuva Puraskar
- Assamese
- Bengali
- Bodo
- Dogri
- English
- Gujarati
- Hindi
- Kannada
- Kashmiri
- Konkani
- Maithili
- Malayalam
- Meitei (Manipuri)
- Marathi
- Nepali
- Odia
- Punjabi
- Rajasthani
- Sanskrit
- Santali
- Sindhi
- Tamil
- Telugu
- Urdu
Sahitya Akademi Bal Sahitya Puraskar
- Assamese
- Bengali
- Bodo
- Dogri
- English
- Gujarati
- Hindi
- Kannada
- Kashmiri
- Konkani
- Maithili
- Malayalam
- Meitei (Manipuri)
- Marathi
- Nepali
- Odia
- Punjabi
- Rajasthani
- Sanskrit
- Santali
- Sindhi
- Tamil
- Telugu
- Urdu
Related
- Eighth Schedule to the Constitution of India
- Official Languages Commission
- List of languages by number of native speakers in India

Sahitya Akademi Translation Prizes are given each year to writers for their outstanding translations work in the 24 languages, since 1989.

== Recipients ==
Following is the list of recipients of Sahitya Akademi translation prizes for their works written in Bengali. The award, as of 2019, consisted of ₹50,000.

Year	Translator	Title of the translation	Original Title	Original Language	Genre	Original Author	Ref.
1989	Nileena Abraham	Patummar Chhagal O Balyaskhi	Pathummayude Adu and Balyakalasakhi	Malayalam	Short Stories	Vaikom Muhammad Basheer	
1990	Maitri Shukla	Unish Bigha Dui Katha	Chha Man Atha Guntha	Oriya	Novel	Fakirmohan Senapati	
1991	S. Krishnamoorthy	Raktabanya	Kurudtppunal	Tamil	Novel	Indira Parthasarathi	
1992	Maya Gupta	Kak O Kala Pani	Kavve aur Kalapani	Hindi	Short Stories	Nirmal Verma	
1993	Manabendra Bandyopadhyay	Vaikom Muhammad Bashirer Srestha	Collection	Malayalam	Short Stories	Vaikom Muhammad Basheer	
1994	Vina Alase	Gulamgiri	Gulamgiri	Marathi	Dialogues	Jyotiva Govindarao Phule	
1995	Kanailal Datta	Vinoba Bhave Rachanavali	Ahimsa Ki Talash	Hindi	Autobiographical Writing	Vinoba Bhave	
1996	Ranendranath Bandyopadhyay	Sarpa O Rajju	The Serpent and the Rope	English	Novel	Raja Rao	
1997	Rameswar Shaw Kabita	Bhabishyater	The Future Poetry	English	Essays	Sri Aurobindo	
1998	Jaya Mitra Dhara	Jipsy Nadir	Khanabadosh	Punjabi	Autobiography	Ajeet Kaur	
1999	Sankha Ghosh	Raktakalyan	Taledanda	Kannada	Play	Girish Karnad	
2000	Afsar Ahmed & Kalim Hazique	Sare Tin Hat Bhume	Do Gaz Zameen	Urdu	Novel	Abdus Samad	
2001	Nani Sur	Krishna Chanderer Nirbachita Galpa	Collection	Urdu		Krishan Chander	
2002	Usha Ranjan Bhattacharya	Mrityunjay	Mrityunjay	Assamese	Novel	B.K. Bhattacharyya	
2003	Malay Roy Choudhury	Suryer Saptam Asva	Suraj Ka Satwan Ghoda	Hindi	Novel	Dharmavir Bharati	
2004	Sujit Choudhury	Asamiya Galpa Sankalan	Collection	Assamese	Short Stories	Nirmalprabha Bardoloi	
2005	Ranjan Bandyopadhyay	Kabir Bijak O Ananya Kabita	Collection	Hindi	Poetry	Kabir	
2006	Jyoti Bhusan Chaki	Kaifi Ajmir Kabita	Collection	Urdu	Poetry	Kaifi Azmi	
2007	Subimal Basak	Amar Tomar Tar Katha	Meri Teri Uski Baat	Hindi	Novel	Yashpal	
2008	Bharati Nandi	Chitrata Andhakar	Patadei	Oriya	Short Stories	Binapani Mohanty	
2009	Ujjal Singha	Mitro Marjani	Mitro Marjani	Hindi	Novel	Krishna Sobti	
2010	Shyamal Bhattachrya	Kumari Harinir Chokh	Moon Di Akh	Punjabi	Short Stories	Mohan Bhandari	
2011	Jagat Debnath	Raghaber Dinrat	Raghav Vel	Marathi	Novel	Namdev Kamble	
2012	Oinam Nilkantha Singh	Bristi Ar Holo Na	Nongdi Tarak-Khidared	Manipuri	Short Stories	Keisham Priyokumar	
2013	Soma Bandyopadhyay	Gathanbad, Uttar-Gathanbad Ebang Prachya Kavyatattva	Sakhtiyat, Pas-Sakhtiyat Aur Mashriqi Sheriyat	Urdu	Criticism	Gopi Chand Narang	
2014	Binay Kumar Mahata	Ei Prithibi Paglagarad	Eh Batha Sansar	Maithili	Novel	Sudhangshusekhar Chowdhury	
2015	Mau Das Gupta	Anamdaser Puthi	Anamdas Ka Potha	Hindi	Novel	Hazari Prasad Dwivedi	
2016	Gita Chaudhuri	Satyer Anwesan	Satyana Prayogo	Gujarati	Autobiography	Mohandas Karamchand Gandhi	
2017	(Late) Utpal Kumar Basu	Kebal Atmai Jane Kibhabe Gan Gaite Hay: Nirbachita Kabita	Only The Soul Knows How To Sing	English	Poetry	Kamala Das	
2018	Mabinul Haq	Lep O Anyanyo Galpo	Lihaaf	Urdu	Short Stories	Ismat Chughtai	
2019	Tapan Bandyopadhyay	Bharatvarsa	Collection	Odiya	Poetry	Sitakant Mahapatra	
2020	Puspito Mukhopadhyay	Galib Patrabali	Khutut E Galib	Urdu	Collection of Letters by Mirza Ghalib	Khaliq Anjum	
2021	Neeta Sen Samarth	Yugant	Yugant	Marathi	Play	Mahesh Elkunchwar	
2022	Saubhik De Sarkar	Amar Baba Baliah	My Father Baliah	English	Autobiography	Y. B. Satyanarayana	
2023	Mrinmoy Pramanick	Dalit Nandantattwa	Dalit Sahitya Che Soundharya Shashtra	Marathi	Literary Criticism	Sharankumar Limbale	

== See also ==
- List of Sahitya Akademi Award winners for Bengali
