= List of Sahitya Akademi Translation Prize winners for Odia =

List of winners of a literary honor in India

Part of a series on

Sahitya Akademi Awards
Category
Sahitya Akademi Award winners by language
- Assamese
- Bengali
- Bodo
- Dogri
- English
- Gujarati
- Hindi
- Kannada
- Kashmiri
- Konkani
- Maithili
- Malayalam
- Marathi
- Meitei (Manipuri)
- Nepali
- Odia
- Punjabi
- Rajasthani
- Sanskrit
- Santali
- Sindhi
- Tamil
- Telugu
- Urdu
Sahitya Akademi Translation Prizes
- Assamese
- Bengali
- Bodo
- Dogri
- English
- Gujarati
- Hindi
- Kannada
- Kashmiri
- Konkani
- Maithili
- Malayalam
- Marathi
- Meitei (Manipuri)
- Nepali
- Odia
- Punjabi
- Rajasthani
- Sanskrit
- Santali
- Sindhi
- Tamil
- Telugu
- Urdu
Sahitya Akademi Yuva Puraskar
- Assamese
- Bengali
- Bodo
- Dogri
- English
- Gujarati
- Hindi
- Kannada
- Kashmiri
- Konkani
- Maithili
- Malayalam
- Meitei (Manipuri)
- Marathi
- Nepali
- Odia
- Punjabi
- Rajasthani
- Sanskrit
- Santali
- Sindhi
- Tamil
- Telugu
- Urdu
Sahitya Akademi Bal Sahitya Puraskar
- Assamese
- Bengali
- Bodo
- Dogri
- English
- Gujarati
- Hindi
- Kannada
- Kashmiri
- Konkani
- Maithili
- Malayalam
- Meitei (Manipuri)
- Marathi
- Nepali
- Odia
- Punjabi
- Rajasthani
- Sanskrit
- Santali
- Sindhi
- Tamil
- Telugu
- Urdu
Related
- Eighth Schedule to the Constitution of India
- Official Languages Commission
- List of languages by number of native speakers in India

Sahitya Akademi Translation Prizes are given each year to writers for their outstanding translations work in the 24 languages, since 1989.

== Recipients ==
Following is the list of recipients of Sahitya Akademi translation prizes for their works written in Odia. The award, as of 2019, consisted of ₹50,000.

Year	Translator	Title of the translation	Original Title	Original Language	Genre	Original Author	References
1989	Basanta Kumari Devi	Ganadebata, Parts I and II	Ganadebata	Bengali	Novel	Tarasankar Bandyopadhyay	
1990	Laxmi Narayan Mohanty	Banachari	Aranyak	Bengali	Novel	Bibhutibhushan Bandyopadhyay	
1991	Nilamani Mishra	Kete Nachaiba Gopal	Nachyau Bahut Gopal	Hindi	Novel	Amritlal Nagar	
1992	Srinivas Udgata	Soubhagya Noopur	Suhag ke Nupur	Hindi	Novel	Amritlal Nagar	
1993	Barendra Krushna Dhal	Samba	Shamba	Bengali	Novel	Samaresh Basu	
1994	V.P. Joglekar	Thumari	Thumri	Marathi	Poetry	Sukanta Bhattacharya	
1995	Nandini Satpathy	Revenue Tikat	Rasidi Tikat	Punjabi	Autobiography	Amrita Pritam	
1996	Jiwan Pani	Muhan-Sanjha	Aranazhika Neram	Malayalam	Novel	Parappurath	
1997	Jugal Kishor Dutta	Asami Hazir	Asami Hazir	Bengali	Novel	Bimal Mitra	
1998	Asit Mohanty	Adhyaya Ekabinsha	Collection	Miscellaneous	Short stories	Various authors	
1999	Chandra Sekhar Das Burma	Gotia Gadhara Atmakatha	Ek Gadhey Ki Atmakatha	Hindi	Novel	Krishan Chander	
2000	Amresh Patnaik	Tista Tatara Brutanta	Tista Parer Vrittanta	Bengali	Novel	Debes Ray	
2001	Janaki Ballav Patnaik	Bankima Upanyasmala (2 Volumes)	Collection	Bengali	Novel	Bankimchandra Chattopadhyay	
2002	Nrusingha Tripathy	Charu Chandralekha	Charu Chandralekha	Hindi	Novel	Hazari Prasad Dwivedi	
2003	Soudamini Nanda	Andha Yug	Andha Yug	Hindi	Play	Dharamvir Bharati	
2004	Hemakanta Misra	Barabula Debaduta	Awara Masiha	Hindi	Biography	Vishnu Prabhakar	
2005	Prabhakar Swain	Nirmal Vermanka Shreshtha Galpa	Collection	Hindi	Short stories	Nirmal Verma	
2006	Sudarshan Acharya	Katha Sarita Sagara – I & II	Kathasaritsagara	Sanskrit	fairy tales	Somadeva	
2007	Bipin Bihari Mishra	Antarjatra	Andha Yug	Hindi	Play	Dharamvir Bharati	
2008	Jyotsna Rout Biswal	Maharathi	Maharathi	Assamese	Novel	Chandra Prakash Saikia	
2009	Dharanidhara Panigrahi	Karan Singh: Atmajibani	Karan Singh: An Autobiography	Kannada	Play	Karan Singh	
2010	Amiyabala Patnaik	Renu Rachna Sanchayan	Renu Rachna Sanchayan	Hindi	Short stories	Phanishwar Nath Renu	
2011	Sangram Jena	Umrao Jan Ada	Umrao Jaan Ada	Urdu	Novel	Mirza Hadi Ruswa	
2012	Prasanta Kumar Mohanty	Sei Pakhitir Na Ruswa	Us Chiria Ka Nam	Hindi	Novel	Pankaj Bisht	
2013	Bilasini Mohanty	Anabruta Andhakar: Saadat Hasan Manton Ka Ardhasata Kahani	Collection	Urdu	Short stories	Saadat Hasan Manto	
2014	Rabindra Kumar Praharaj	Thilagharar Gehlapua	Alaler Gharer Dulal	Bengali	Novel	Peary Chand Mitra	
2015	Shakuntala Baliarsingh	Kaberi Bhali Jhiatia	Oru Kaberiyai Pola	Tamil	Novel	Tripurasundari Lakshmi	
2016	Monalisa Jena	Ashirbadara Ranga	Ashirbader Rang	Asamese	Novel	Arun Sarma	
2017	Suryamani Khuntia	Yuganta	Yuganta	Marathi	Short stories	Irawati Karve	
2018	Shradhanjali Kanungo	Srimayee Maa	Srimayee Maa	Bengali	Novel	Naba Kumar Basu	
2019	Ajoy Kumar Patnaik	Shrestha Hindi Galpa	Collection	hindi	Short stories	Various authors	
2020	Manju Modi	Kalyani	Kalyani	Hindi	Novel	Jainendra Kumar	
2021	Gourahari Das	Chheli Chareibara Dina	Aadujeevitham	Malayalam	Novel	Benyamin	
2022	Kamala Satpathy	Suneli Badala	Vendi Megham	Telugu	Novel	Syed Saleem	
2023	Bangali Nanda	Nelluri Keshavaswamynka Shrestha Galpa	Nelluri Keshavaswamy Uthama Kathalu	Telugu	Short Stories	Nelluri Keshavaswamy	
2024	Suvash Satpathy	Ruskin Bond Kokishialira Ekaka Nrutya Mo Atmajeebani	Lone fox Dancing	Telugu	Autobiography	Ruskin Bond	

== See also ==
- List of Sahitya Akademi Award winners for Odia
