= List of Yuva Puraskar winners for Bengali =

List of winners of a literary honor in India

Part of a series on

Sahitya Akademi Awards
Category
Sahitya Akademi Award winners by language
- Assamese
- Bengali
- Bodo
- Dogri
- English
- Gujarati
- Hindi
- Kannada
- Kashmiri
- Konkani
- Maithili
- Malayalam
- Marathi
- Meitei (Manipuri)
- Nepali
- Odia
- Punjabi
- Rajasthani
- Sanskrit
- Santali
- Sindhi
- Tamil
- Telugu
- Urdu
Sahitya Akademi Translation Prizes
- Assamese
- Bengali
- Bodo
- Dogri
- English
- Gujarati
- Hindi
- Kannada
- Kashmiri
- Konkani
- Maithili
- Malayalam
- Marathi
- Meitei (Manipuri)
- Nepali
- Odia
- Punjabi
- Rajasthani
- Sanskrit
- Santali
- Sindhi
- Tamil
- Telugu
- Urdu
Sahitya Akademi Yuva Puraskar
- Assamese
- Bengali
- Bodo
- Dogri
- English
- Gujarati
- Hindi
- Kannada
- Kashmiri
- Konkani
- Maithili
- Malayalam
- Meitei (Manipuri)
- Marathi
- Nepali
- Odia
- Punjabi
- Rajasthani
- Sanskrit
- Santali
- Sindhi
- Tamil
- Telugu
- Urdu
Sahitya Akademi Bal Sahitya Puraskar
- Assamese
- Bengali
- Bodo
- Dogri
- English
- Gujarati
- Hindi
- Kannada
- Kashmiri
- Konkani
- Maithili
- Malayalam
- Meitei (Manipuri)
- Marathi
- Nepali
- Odia
- Punjabi
- Rajasthani
- Sanskrit
- Santali
- Sindhi
- Tamil
- Telugu
- Urdu
Related
- Eighth Schedule to the Constitution of India
- Official Languages Commission
- List of languages by number of native speakers in India

Yuva Puraskar is given each year to young writers for their outstanding works in the 24 languages, since 2011.

== Recipients ==
Following is the list of recipients of Yuva Puraskar for their works written in Bengali. The award comprises a cash prize of Rs. 50,000 and an engraved copper plaque.

| Year | Author | Work | Type of Work | Reference |
|---|---|---|---|---|
| 2011 | Binod Ghoshal | Danawola Manus | Short Stories | |
| 2012 | Sadique Hossain | Sammohan | Short Stories | |
| 2013 | Subhro Bandopadhyay | Bouddho Lekhomala O Onyanyo Shraman | Poetry | |
| 2014 | Abhimanyu Mahato | Mati (Earth) | Poetry | |
| 2015 | Sudip Chakraborty | Premer Size Battirish | Poetry | |
| 2016 | Raka Dasgupta | Aparanha Downtown | Poetry | |
| 2017 | Shamik Ghosh | Elvis O Amolasundari | Short Stories | |
| 2018 | Samragnee Bandyopadhyay | Khelnabatir Din Sesh | Poetry | |
| 2019 | Moumita | Kuntal Fire Ase | Novel | |
| 2020 | Sayam Bandyopadhyay | Puranpurush | Novel | |
| 2021 | Gourob Chakraborty | Sreeman Sonnet | Poetry | |
| 2022 | Suman Patari | Likhe Kichu Hoy Na | Poetry | |
| 2023 | Hamiruddin Middya | Mathrakha | Short Stories | |
| 2024 | Sutapa Chakraborty | Deraje Halud Ful, Gatajanma | Poetry | |
| 2025 | Sudeshna Moitra | Ekrokha Chiruni Tollashi | Poetry | |

== See also ==
- List of Sahitya Akademi Award winners for Bengali
- List of Sahitya Akademi Translation Prize winners for Bengali
