= Prabodh Chandra Bagchi =

Indian Sino-Indologist

Prabodh Chandra Bagchi প্রবোধচন্দ্র-বাগচী
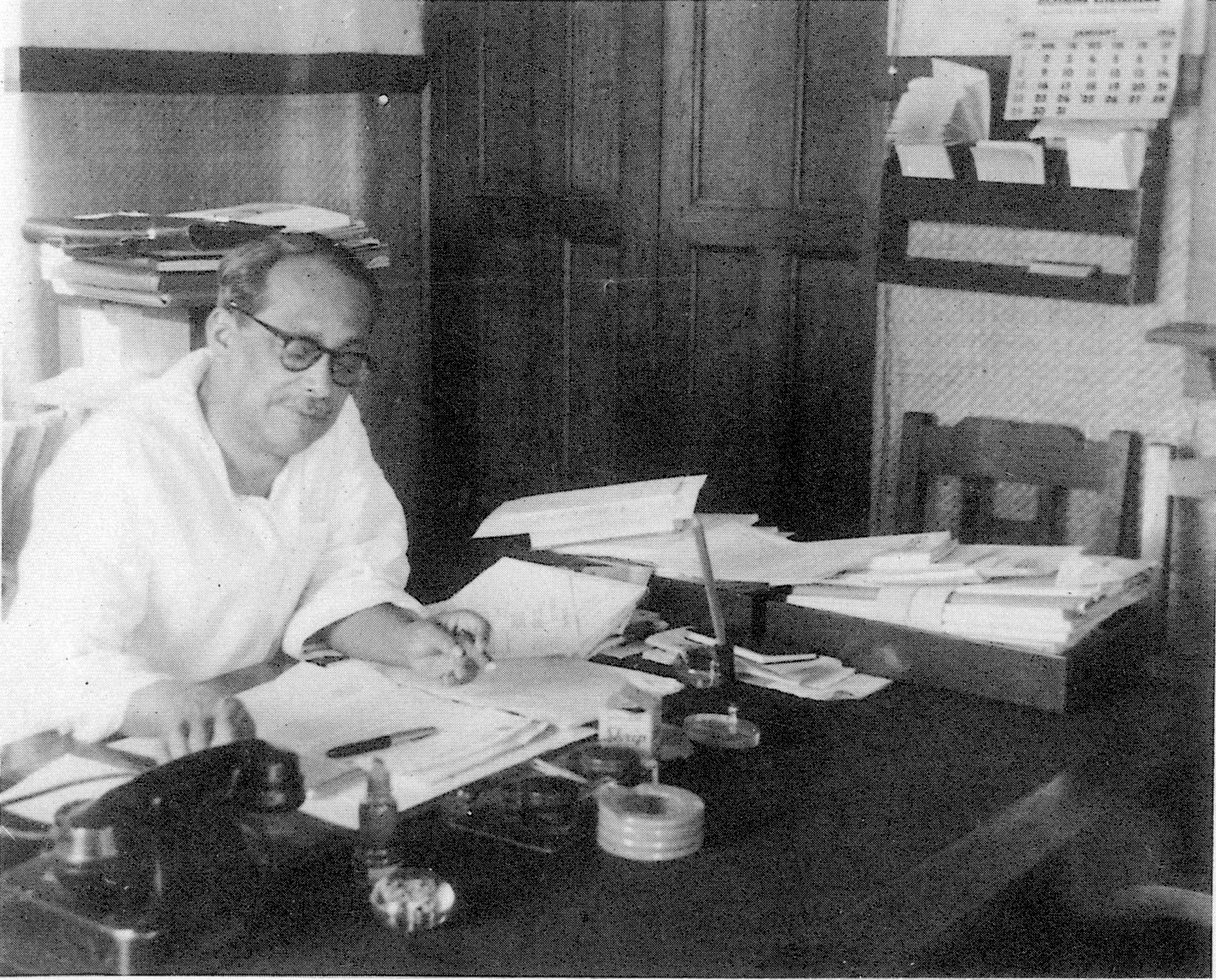
- Dr P.C. Bagchi in his office at Visva Bharati
- Born: 18 November 1898; Jessore, Bengal, British India (now Magura, Bangladesh)
- Died: 19 January 1956 (aged 57); Santiniketan, West Bengal, India
- Occupations: Sinologist, Indologist

Prabodh Chandra Bagchi (Bengali: প্রবোধচন্দ্র-বাগচী) (18 November 1898 – 19 January 1956) was one of the most notable Sino-Indologists of the 20th century. He was the third Vice-Chancellor of Visva-Bharati University.

== Early life and education ==
Prabodh Chandra Bagchi was born on 18 November 1898, the eldest son of Shri Harinath Bagchi and Smt Tarangini Devi in present-day Bangladesh in the Magura District. He lost his mother in early childhood. He completed his schooling in Srikole, Magura District. Bagchi was a brilliant student and a favorite of his teachers and Head Master who expected great things of him. In 1914, he appeared for the Matriculation examination. He graduated from Krishnagar Government College in 1918 with honors in Sanskrit. He stood first in his college and received the prestigious Mohini Mohan Roy award. Although he showed promise in Mathematics, he took Sanskrit, the classical language of India, because of his desire to study ancient Indian history. He joined Calcutta University for his post-graduation studies in Ancient History and Culture, obtaining a First Class M.A. in 1920. He was awarded a gold medal in the Religion Section and overall stood first in the university.

== Academic career and contributions ==
After his post-graduation from Calcutta University, he immediately joined the university as a lecturer after being called by Sir Ashutosh Mukherjee who told him to "Join from tomorrow" (In Bengali, as noted in his personal diary). The period from 1921 onwards was highly significant for Prabodh Chandra Bagchi in fulfilling his dream to become a true Orientalist. He realised the need for reconstructing ancient history and the multifaceted Indian cultural history more scientifically on a broader Asiatic perspective. With this lofty dream in mind, he started learning Chinese and Japanese from Professor Kimura and Professor Masuda of Calcutta University and German from Professor Taraporewala. Sir Ashutosh Mukherjee, the Vice-Chancellor deputed Prabodh Chandra to learn Chinese and Tibetan from Sylvain Lévi, the Professor of Sanskrit and Indian Civilization in the Sorbonne University, Paris who was in Santiniketan on an invitation from Rabindranath Tagore. It was also from Sylvain Lévi and the great poet Rabindranath that Prabodh Chandra imbibed a new approach to research on the Indian cultural history which renewed his endeavour to learn various foreign languages to have access to the original source materials. Instead of fragmented specialised studies he realised that ancient Indian history and culture should be viewed in its entirety so that many obscure areas would be brought into light.

In 1922, young Prabodh reached the first milestone of his career, when he accompanied Sylvain Lévi and Madame Lévi to Nepal. His painstaking work in exploring original manuscripts and the Tibetan and Chinese manuscripts of old Sanskrit texts which were lost in their originals but preserved in their translations at the Royal Durbar Library of Nepal resulted in his invaluable findings in the domain of Indological research. Among his findings the palm leaf manuscripts of Kaula-Jnana- Nirnaya and Sammoho Tantra need special mention as they throw light on mysticism, influence of Sakti-ism on later Buddhism and emergence of new religious creeds. In 1922, Prabodh reached another milestone when he was awarded Rashbehari Ghosh Travelling Fellowship for one year. He travelled to Indo-China, Cambodia, Cochin-China and Japan. He got the opportunity to work with Sylvain Lévi, Louis Finot, the founder of Ecole de Pali in Phnom Penh, George Groslier who established a renowned museum in Phnom Penh, National Museum of Cambodia, Henry Marshal, the head of Ecole Francaise d' extreme orient in Hanoi and Henri Permentier exponent of Khmer art and culture. Prabodh Chandra was enriched with their exploratory survey of the archaeological remains of Angkor Vat. He stayed in Hanoi and was fortunate to attend Chinese classes conducted by Prof. Auroussean. He visited Japan and benefited extensively from his stay at the Monastery of Koyasen. During the period between 1923 and 1926, Prabodh Chandra was in France on a government scholarship for higher studies. He worked on following areas during his time in France:

- on Sanskrit Buddhist literature with Sylvain Lévi,
- on the ancient remains of Indian civilisation in Central Asia with Paul Pelliot,
- on Buddhist literature in China with Henri Maspero,
- on the ancient Pali texts with Jules Bloch and
- on Avestan gathas with Antoine Meillet.

He was awarded the highest degree of Docteur es Letters (State Doctorate) by the Paris University.

Bagchi served the Department of Ancient History and Culture of Calcutta University during the period between 1926 and 1944. He contributed immensely to the enhancement of the research studies on humanities with his innumerable writings based on his own findings.

In 1929 and 1930, he was sent to Nepal again to carry on his research from the Chinese and Tibetan manuscripts on Tantrik Buddhism(Vajrayana), Buddhist Siddhacharyas and Charyagiti(Charyapada) and Dohakosa (Dohakosa of Tillopada and Sarahapada). In 1931, he along with Professors Suniti Kumar Chatterjee and Sukumar Sen formed an informal study circle at the Calcutta University for various deliberations on the discipline of historical linguistics, which was known as the science of comparative philology. Subsequently in the year 1938, this Philological Society merged with the Indian Linguistic Society with Dr. Sukumar Sen as its secretary and Dr. Bagchi as its treasurer.

Prabodh Chandra's residence at Ballygunge Place, Kolkata became a hub of cultural and intellectual activities. Parichayagosthi, an association of eminent literary persons like Hiran Kumar Sanyal, Bishnu Dey, Sudhin Datta and others had their gatherings at Prabodh's residence. Sarojini Naidu also attended this gathering. Pramatha Nath Chowdhury was a frequent visitor and was extremely fond of Prabodh Chandra Bagchi.

He presided over a number of conferences like Howrah Teachers' Conference and Divya Memorial Conference at Rangpur in 1937, Brihattara Banga Sahitya Sammelan (Greater Bengali Literary Conference) held in Guwahati, Assam and at Rangoon, Burma in 1939, Indian History Congress at Aligarh, All India Oriental Conference (section of Pali and Buddhism) in Nagpur in 1946.

Prabodh Chandra, who already established himself as an exponent in Sinology joined Visva Bharati University at Santiniketan as Director of Research Studies under the Chinese Cultural Studies Scheme on a special grant from the Chinese Government in the year 1945. He was still on deputation from Calcutta University. In the meantime, the government of India created a Chair Professorship at Peking University to promote Sino-Indian understanding and cultural ties. Prabodh Chandra was selected for this prestigious post for a period of two years. He fulfilled his new assignment successfully and his house at 41\M Legation Street in Peking became a hub of Indo-Chinese cultural activities. An international conference (23–24 November 2008) was held in Beijing to commemorate the 110th birth anniversary of Professors Prabodh Chandra Bagchi and Tan Yunshan by remembering their scholarly contribution to Sino-Indian studies. This conference which was inaugurated by Mrs. Nirupama Rao, then Indian Ambassador to China. A book on the collection of articles written by Prabodh Chandra was also released at the conference (India and China: Interactions through Buddhism and Diplomacy).

On his return from China, he resumed his work at Visva Bharati and took charge of Vidya Bhavana, the department of higher studies. In recognition of his valuable contributions to Oriental Studies, he was awarded the Honorary Diploma by Ecole Francaise d' Extreme Orient.

Between 1949 and 1951, Bagchi delivered a series of lectures at Jadavpur, Calcutta University as its Hemchandra Basu Mallik Professor. These highly illuminating lectures were on:

- the nomadic movements in early Central Asia
- the history of the relations between Tokharistan and Eastern Iran
- the history of the early states in the oases of Chinese Turkestan
- the uses of the Indian scripts and languages in Central Asia

These lectures were compiled into a book entitled "India and Central Asia" and published by Jadavpur, National Council of Education in 1955. To quote Professor B.N. Mukherjee, an eminent Orientalist evaluating this book and Bagchi's profound scholarship in the Centenary Volume "...he (Bagchi) was the first competent Indian scholar to delve into the past of Central Asia. He will always adorn a niche in the facade of Indo-Central Asian scholarship." In 1952, he was sent to China as a delegate of the first Indian cultural delegation from independent India, led by Smt. Vijaya Lakshmi Pandit.

== Visva Bharati and death ==
Bagchi had been involved with Visva-Bharati University since 1945 and had taken charge of Vidya Bhavana, the department of higher studies. He was appointed Vice – Chancellor (Upacharya) of Visva Bharati University in April 1954. As a recognition of his contribution to academics, Bagchi became the first full Vice-Chancellor from outside the Tagore family. This was short-lived tenure as he died on 19 January 1956 after a heart attack.

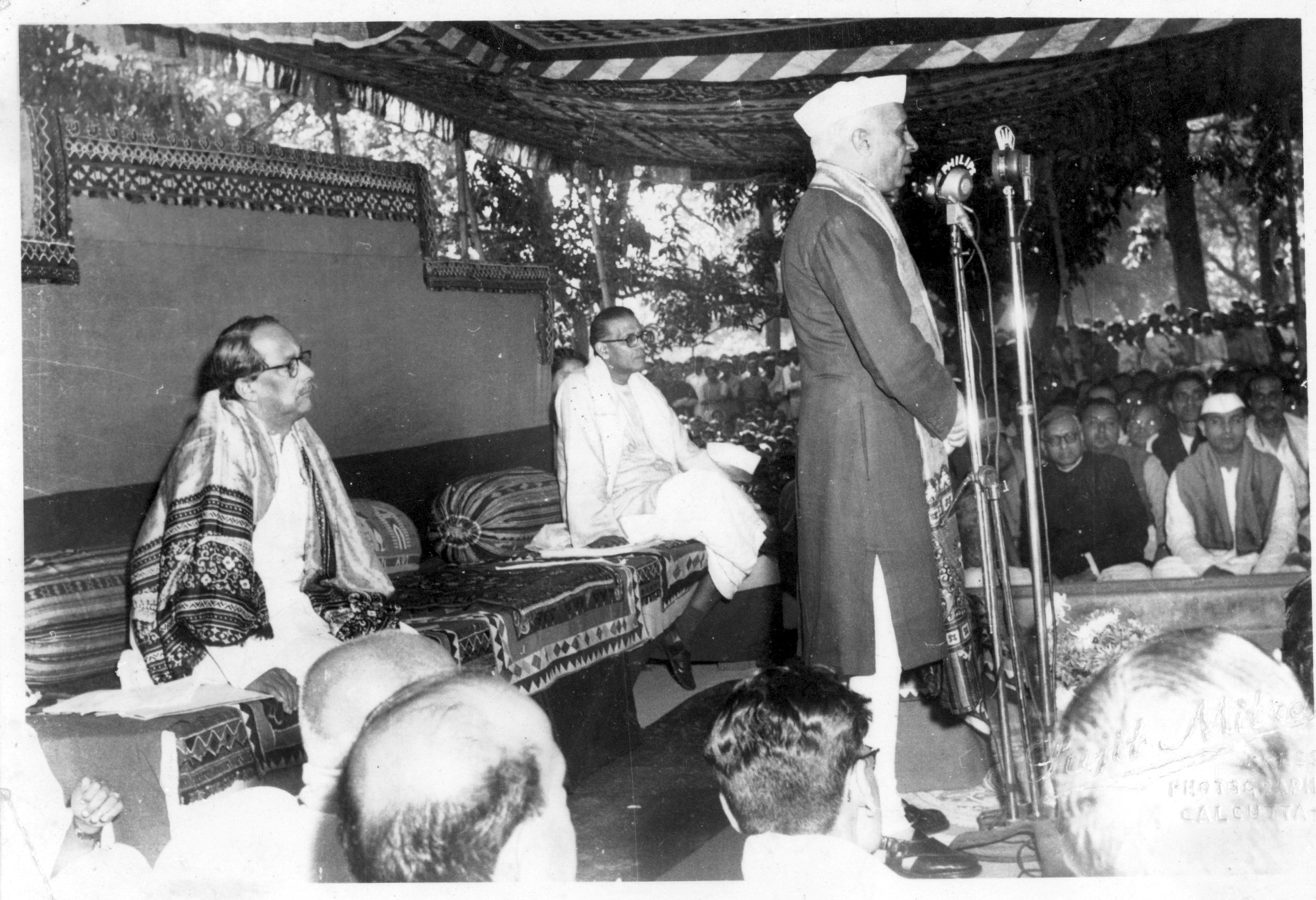
Pandit Nehru speaking at the convocation at the Visva Bharati. Dr PC Bagchi, Vice-Chancellor is seated in the left lower side of the picture.

Despite his brief term in his office, he proved to be an able administrator. The all round growth of Visva Bharati in keeping with the ideals of its founder, the great poet Rabindranath Tagore became his main thrust. He expanded spheres of activities in all the departments and introduced the three years' degree course in the graduation level with many other related changes in the curricula.

To make Visva Bharati a centre of studies of Eastern Humanities, he re-organised the Department of Indology and created higher posts of professorship in the Indo-Tibetan and Japanese Departments. The encouragement given to research by him despite institutional financial constraints was highly commendable. He personally used to guide the research students and make arrangements for their publication. He used to edit personally the Quarterly journals like Sino-Indian Studies, Visva Bharati Annals and Sahitya Prakashika.

He introduced many new technical subjects like Applied Mechanics, Metal work etc. in the curricula of Siksha Shatra, the nucleus of Sriniketan. To quote Prabodh Chandra: "Through sustained contacts with Sriniketan I have now arrived at the firm conclusion that without Sriniketan, Santiniketan is incomplete. If Sriniketan is kept aloof from Santiniketan then we could not live up to the ideals of Gurudeva."

Bagchi kept up his prolific academic work during his tenure as Vice-Chancellor. In 1954, Bagchi delivered a series of scholarly lectures in memory of Adhar Chandra Mukherjee at the Calcutta University on the obscure field of India and South East Asia. In the same year P.C. Bagchi was invited by the Government of India to lead a cultural delegation to China which he declined due to his preoccupation with the administrative work of Visva-Bharati.

Even whilst carrying out his administrative duties as Vice-Chancellor and despite his failing health, Bagchi carried out his research work late into the night. Many unfinished works were found on his study table after his sudden death. Out of these, only She-Kia-Fang-Che was posthumously published by the Visva-Bharati University in 1959. This treatise, translated from old Chinese into English for the first time by Bagchi, was written by Tao-Siuan, a disciple of the famous Chinese monk and pilgrim Xuanzang (Hiuen-Tsang) who lived between A.D.596 and 667. This book is of immense value as one of the major sources of our knowledge about the ancient geography, prevailing Buddhism and the travel account of Xuanzang. To quote Professor B. N. Mukherjee "Though published without any critical introduction or notes, obviously due to the translator's sudden and unexpected demise in course of the preparation of the publication, the translation may be included among Professor Bagchi's greatest contribution to the study of Central Asia." Centenary Volume India and Asia.

Prabodh Chandra's sudden death was a great shock for Visva Bharati and the educational fraternity. Visva Bharati wrote in its news: "Dr. Bagchi's earthly pilgrimage is over. His name and fame now belong to history. Although this is an irreparable loss, we shall be proud to recollect that he was our own...A man of letters, he will certainly live more than his years." The Ministry of Education, Government of India resolved: "This meeting...the Ministry of Education in the Government of India places on record its deep sense of loss at the untimely and sudden passing away of Dr.P.C.Bagchi, Vice-Chancellor, Visva Bharati, Santiniketan. Dr. Bagchi's death is a loss not only to Visva Bharati with which he was connected over a period of years, but to the cause of scholarship throughout the country. In him the nation has lost a distinguished scholar, Indologist, Sinologist and a worker who strived steadfastly for the ideals of Satyam, Shivam and Sundaram, which have been the motto of the university since its inception."

What stood out in his scholarship was his holistic approach to his research and indeed, to his life.

== Personal life ==
In 1921, he married Panna Rani Devi, the daughter of Rai Saheb Taraknath Moitra and Hemangini Devi from Pabna. She managed the family's daily life and supported her husband’s academic work. She also took care of her home while he traveled for research or spent time in his library. She was also present while he worked on his Remington typewriter to record his observations. She was known for her hospitality and tender nature and was popular with his colleagues, students and friends. They had a son (Pratip) and five daughters (Chitra, Krishna, Gopa, Ratna, Indrani).

Prabodh Chandra Bagchi was a man of sensitivity which is evident from his love for animals, music, aesthetics and refined life style. His compassion for the have-nots knew no bounds. He used to contribute a considerable amount every month from his own salary as scholarships to the needy yet deserving students.

== Bagchi the patriot ==
Whilst at Paris, the young Bagchi also made his mark as an organiser. He was one of the founders of "Association des Etudiante Hindous de France (Association of Indian Students of France). He was loved by Indian students and whenever required, he was ready to extend his helping hand. The scientist, Satyendra Nath Bose personally benefited from an introductory letter to Madame Marie Curie by Prof. Sylvain Lévi at the request of Bagchi. Satyendra Nath Bose has given an illuminating account of the significant role played by the young Bagchi, a man of 'exemplary integrity' in a chapter in his Bengali compilation of essays.

This organisation under the guidance of Prabodh Chandra gave shelter to the Indian freedom fighters who were branded as anti-government by the British authorities. The Association was involved in revolutionary activities with its branches in various European cities and its headquarters at 17, Rue de Sommerard in Paris.

Even early in his life, during his post-graduate studies, he was actively associated with the Anushilan Samiti, an organisation to trigger anti-British nationalistic activities. This was founded in Dacca by Pramathanath Mitra, better known as Barrister P. Mitra, on whom Vivekananda made an indelible impact. Later on, this organisation was transferred to Calcutta.

== Some eminent students ==
Bagchi left behind a rich legacy through several of his students who went on to gain pre-eminence in their field. Some are listed here:

- Pratap Chandra Chunder- a prominent educationist, who became Union Minister of Education in the Morarji Desai Ministry
- Prof Dilip Kumar Biswas, former president of The Asiatic Society
- Prof Biswanath Bannerjee, former president of The Asiatic Society
- Emeritus Prof Kalyan Kumar Sarkar, Windsor University, Ontario, Canada
- Prof Narayan Sen, noted Sinologist
- Prof Biswadeb Mukherjee noted Sinologist specialising in Chinese Buddhism

== Centenary year commemoration ==
Bagchi's immense contribution to his field was highlighted with Centenary Celebrations at

- Visva-Bharati University – a souvenir edited by Prof. Dilip Kumar Ganguly was published
- Ancient Indian History Department, Calcutta University
- Indian Museum, Kolkata – a book titled Tribute to PC Bagchi: Prabodhochandradaya was published edited by Prof Shyamal Kanti Chakravarty
- The Asiatic Society, Kolkata – a book titled Contributions of PC Bagchi on IndoTibetology edited by Prof Haraprasad Ray (ISBN 81-7236-117-3, ISBN 978-81-7236-117-4),
- National Library of India, Kolkata with an excellent exhibition
- Paschimbanga Bangla Akademi, Kolkata – Prabodh Chandra Bagchi a biography written by Ratna Sinha, Prof Kalyan Kumar Sarkar, Prof Suniti Pathak, Prof Haraprasad Ray and, Prof BN Mukherjee was published alongside Prabandha Samgraha (a collection of essays) by Probodhchandra Bagchi (ISBN 81-7751-019-3)edited by Prof Jyoti Bhusan Chaki.
- India and Asia: PC Bagchi Centenary Volume edited by Prof BN Mukherjee, published by Progressive Publishers in 2009 (ISBN 978-81-8064-116-9)

== Works ==
He published a large number of books in English, French and Bengali. He contributed to academic and other journals. His best known work that is still acclaimed as a classical work even today is India and China, (ISBN 81-215-1197-6, ISBN 978-81-215-1197-1), which was first published in 1944. A second edition was brought out in 1950. This book was revised by Haraprasad Ray and published in the fifth edition in 2008.Publisher's page

His other major works were:

- Le canon bouddhique en Chine. Les traducteurs et les traductions. Geuthner, Paris 1927–1938 (2 vol.)
- Deux lexiques sanskrit-chinois. Fan yu tsa ming (《梵語雜名》)de Li Yen (禮言) et Fan yu ts'ien tseu wen (《梵語千字文》) de Yi-tsing (義凈). 2 vol. P. Geuthner, Paris 1929–1937
- Studies in the Tantras. Calcutta. University of Calcutta, 1939

== Select Bibliography ==
Here is a list of books written by Bagchi:

=== Books in French ===
1.Le Canon Bouddhique en Chine les traducteurs et les traductions, Tome 1, pp. lii, 436; Tome II pp. vi 437–742, 1927 : Paris, Librarie Orientaliste Paul Geuthner 1938, Sino-Indica Publications de L'universite de Calcutta

2.Deux Lexiques Sanskrit Chinois Fan Yu Tsa Ming De Li Yen et Fan Yu Ts'ien Tsen Wen De Yi-Tsing : Tome I, pp. iv, 336 : Tome II, pp. viii, 337–590, 1929, Paris, Librarie Orientaliste Paul Geuthner 1937, Sino-Indica Publications de L'universite de Calcutta

=== Books in English ===
3. Pre-Aryan and Pre-Dravidian In India 1929, Calcutta University 1968, Reprinted by Calcutta University

4. Kaula-Jyana-Nirnaya and some Minor Texts of the School of Matsyendranath Calcutta Sanskrit Series, 1934, pp. viii, 92–148, Metropolitan Printing and Publishing House: Calcutta

5. Studies In The Tantras Part-I, 1939 : Calcutta University

6. India and China: a thousand years of cultural relations. Published in Greater India Society, Bulletin 2, Calcutta in 1927 First Edition 1944, China Press, Calcutta Second Edition 1950, Hind Kitab, Bombay

Third Edition 1951, Philosophical Library, New York

Fourth Edition 1981, Saraswat Library, Calcutta

Fifth Edition 2008, Munshiram Manoharlal Publishers Pvt Ltd, New Delhi. ISBN 978-81-215-1197-1.

Chinese Translation "Zhong-Yin Qiannian Shi" 2008, Indian Embassy, Beijing. ISBN 978-81-215-1197-1.

7. India and Central Asia: 1955, National Council of Education, Jadavpur, Calcutta

8. Caryagiti Kosa : P. C. Bagchi & Shanti Bhiksu Sastri 1956, Visva Bharati

9. She-Kia-Fang-Che 1959, Visva Bharati

10. Indological Studies-A collected works of Dr. P. C. Bagchi, vol. I, 1982, Visva Bharati

11. The Second City of the Empire. Editor

=== Books in Bengali ===
Visva Bharati Press

12. Bouddha Dharma O Sahitya

13. Bharat O Indo Chin

14. Bharat O Chin

15. Bharat O Madhya Asia

Bangla Academy

16. Probondho Shamgraho
