= Kaushalya Bannerji =

Canadian poet

Kaushalya Bannerji (born Calcutta) is a Canadian poet, visual artist, and occasional essayist.

A resident of Toronto since the 1970s, Kaushalya Bannerji is the daughter of sociologist, philosopher, and professor Himani Bannerji and professor, translator, and writer, Manabendra Bandyopadhyay (1938–2020). In her pioneering article "A Lotus of Another Color", she delved into the cultural complexities sexuality adds to one's sense of self, especially coming from a socially conservative society. To Bannerji, this dilemma is enhanced by the willingness of many lesbians of the global South to keep their cultural identity and roots, while confronting jaundiced/misogynist and lesphobic opinions that their societies may have about sexuality.

== Selected bibliography ==
- 1993: "No Apologies" in A Lotus of Another Color: An Unfolding of the South Asian Gay and Lesbian Experience, ed. Rakesh Ratti (Boston: Alyson Publications, Inc., ) 59–64.
- 1995: A New Remembrance: Poems, (Toronto: TSAR, ).
- 1996: Pearls of Passion: A Treasury of Lesbian Erotica (Ed. Makeda Silvera et al.) (Toronto: Sistervision Press, )
- 1998: Kaushalya Bannerji (1998-11-11). The faces of five o'clock. Sister Vision Press. ISBN 978-1-896705-10-1.
- 2007: Let the Guitar Raise Her Hand, Selected Lyrics of Silvio Rodriguez (Translation from Spanish) (Kolkata: Tarjama Press, )
- 2012: Grandfather's Kingdom, the Prose Poems of Josefina de Diego (Translation from Spanish) (Kolkata:Tarjama Press, )
