= R. B. Patankar =

Rajaram Bhalchandra Patankar (1 January 1927 – 24 May 2004), generally known as R. B. Patankar, was a Marathi critic and scholar of modern aesthetics, who wrote both in Marathi and English. He received the Sahitya Akademi Award in 1975 for his scholarly work Saundarya Mimansa (1974).

== Biography ==
Patankar was born on 9 January 1927 in Maharashtra. He completed his Master of Arts in English literature from the University of Pune. He earned Ph.D. for his thesis Communication in Literature. He taught at different colleges in Maharashtra and Gujarat during 1951–1964. In 1964, he joined the University of Bombay as a reader in English department and became Head of the department in 1978. He taught aesthetics and criticism there till 1986. He died on 24 May 2004.

== Works ==
Patankar wrote both in Marathi and English. His major works was published in Marathi related to Marathi literature and criticism. Aesthetics and Literary criticism, his first book was published in 1969, followed by three books in Marathi, entitled Saundarya Mimansa (1974), Croceche Saundarya Shastra: Ek Abhyas (1974) and Kantche Saundaryamimansa (1977). Saundarya Mimansa, considered as the monumental works in Marathi literature, deals with the western aesthetics from Plato and Aristotle to Wittgenstein and Sartre, and with Indian tradition from the Sanskrit text to modern Marathi critics.

He wrote Muktibodhanche Sahitya (1986), which evaluates Sharchchandra Muktibodh's contribution to literature. Patankar also published some poems under the pen-name 'Ariel'.

Prabhakar Padhye has written a book on Patankar's theories and principles of aesthetics, namely Patankaranchi Saundarya Mimansa (1977).

== Award ==
Patankar Received Sahitya Akademi Award in 1957 for his book Sahitya Mimansa.
