= Peddibhotla Subbaramayya =

Peddibhotla Subbaramayya (also spelled as Peddibhotla Subbaramaiah; 1938 –18 May 2018) was a Telugu short-story writer from Vijayawada. His short story collection Peddibhotia Subbaramayya Kathalu (Vol. 1) was selected for Sahitya Akademi Award in Telugu for 2012.

== Early life ==
Subbaramayya was born in Guntur in 1938, the son of a railway station master. He went to school in Ongole. For college he came to Vijayawada and became a student of Viswanatha Satyanaryana, the author of Veyipadagalu, and a lecturer of SRR and CVR College. Subbaramayya served as a lecturer in Andhra Loyola College for 40 years and retired in December 1996. He started writing in 1959. "The plight, and the jealousies of the middle class are the raw material of my stories", he says. The author has written more than 200 stories.

== Works ==
- His first novel "Dhruva tara" was published in the weekly Andhra Patrika. He later wrote stories and two novels for Bharati magazine.
- Peddibhotia Subbaramayya Kathalu (Vol. 1)
- Peddibhotla Subbaramayya Kathalu – 2

== Awards ==
- Ravi Sastry Smaraka Sahitya Nidhi
- Gopichand Memorial
- Appajosyula Vishnubhotla Kandalam Foundation Award.
- Sahitya Akademi Award in Telugu, 2012
