= Bandi Narayanaswamy =

Author and teacher

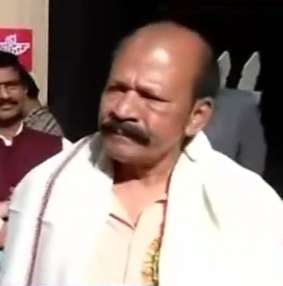
- Bandi Narayanaswamyin 2020
- Born: 3 June 1952 (age 74); Old town, Anantapur district
- Education: Sri Venkateswara University
- Occupations: Writer, Novelist, Teacher
- Awards: Sahitya Akademi Award (2019), Telugu Association of North America Award (2017), NTR Award (2005), YSR Lifetime Achievement Award (2021), AJVB Foundation Award, Telugu University Award, Kathakokila, Kolakaluri Awards.

Bandi Narayanswamy is a Telugu writer, novelist and a teacher. He won the Sahitya Akademi Award in 2019 for his novel Saptabhoomi. He published the novel in 2017 and got the Telugu Association of North America Award for the same.

== Early life and career ==
He was born on 3 June 1952 in Anantapur to an agricultural family. He studied at the PG Center in Sri Venkateswara University.

After completing his education, he worked as a teacher for various government primary and high schools in remote villages.

His other novels are Rendu Kalala Desam, Meerajyam Meerelandi and Gaddalaadatandayi.
