= Gadiyaram Ramakrishna Sarma =

Gadiyaram Ramakrishna Sarma (6 March 1919 - 25 July 2006) was a Telugu writer, Sanskrit scholar, researcher, reformist and historian. Sarma won the Kendra Sahitya Academy Award in Telugu for the Year 2007 for his autobiography: Satapatram ("A Hundred Petals"). In his Hundred Petals, Sarma devoted very little space to write about himself but penned what he had seen during his nine-decade-long life. His autobiography emerged as an authentic work on contemporary social, political and cultural conditions. Sarma presented his Hundred Petals to his wife Kammalamma with a word of praise for her patience.

== Early life ==
Sarma was born on 6 March 1919 in a traditional Telugu Brahmin family in Anantapur district and later migrated to Alampur in Mahabubnagar district in his childhood along with his family and made the historical town his home.

== Works ==
Sarma produced nearly 37 books, including many on the historical backgrounds of temples.

- Madhava Vidyaranya Charita (which was later translated into Kannada)
- Hindu Dharmam
- Alampura Kshethra Mahatyam
- Copper Plate of Vinayaditya at Pallepadu
- Keyurabahu Charitra
- Vignana Vallari
- Mana Vaastu Sampada

== Preservation advocacy ==
He devoted half of his life for the revival of Jogulamba temple at Alampur, which was in ruins and fought for construction of flood protection wall to save the historic temple complex.

== Awards ==
- Sarma was posthumously (died 25 July 2006) awarded Kendra Sahitya Academy Award in Telugu for the Year 2007 for his autobiography- SATAPATRAMULU(A Hundred Petals).
