= Kethu Viswanatha Reddy =

Indian writer (1939–2023)

- కేతు విశ్వనాథరెడ్డి
- Born: 10 July 1939; Rangasaipuram, Kamalapuram, Kadapa district, Andhra Pradesh
- Died: 22 May 2023 (aged 83); Ongole, Andhra Pradesh, India
- Occupations: Writer, novelist and essayist

Kethu Viswanatha Reddy (10 July 1939 – 22 May 2023), also known as Ketu Visvanathareddi, was an Indian short story writer, novelist, and essayist. He won the Sahitya Akademi Award in Telugu in 1996 for his short story Kethu Viswanatha Reddy Kathalu.

== Life and career ==
Kethu Viswanatha Reddy was a writer whose works have been translated into modern Indian languages such as Hindi, Bengali, Kannada, Malayalam, as well as into English and Russian.

Reddy worked many variations on the theme of rural transformation in southern Andhra Pradesh, including its famines, factions, and industrialization. His first short story Anaadivaallu was published the journal Savyasaachi.

Kethu Viswanatha Reddy Kathalu (1998 – 2003), Japthu, and Ichhagni are among his best-known collections of short stories. His novels include Verlu and Bodhi, while his essays were collected in Dristi and Deepadaarulu. His six books Kethu Viswanatha Reddy kathalu, Kethu Viswanatha Reddy kathalu 2, Parichayam, Patrikeyam, Sangamam, and Mana Kodavatiganti were released on the occasion of his AVKF life-time achievement award in January 2009. He had also edited the collections of Kodavatiganti Kutumba Rao's writings. He received a Ph.D degree for his research work Kadapa jilla graama namaala charitra (The history of village names of Kadapa district). A related book, voollu, pearlu, was published later.

Reddy received awards from various organisations including the Central Sahitya Academy (New Delhi), Bhartiya Bhasa Parishad (Calcutta), and Telugu University (Hyderabad). Other awards include the Raavi Shastry Award for Literature and the Best Teacher Award for University Teachers from the Government of Andhra Pradesh.

Reddy retired as director of Dr. B. R. Ambedkar Open University. Dr. Reddy held responsibilities such as the chief editor of ‘Eebhoomi’, the Telugu socio-political weekly managed by film producer sri CC Reddy.

Kethu Viswanatha Reddy died in Ongole on 22 May 2023, at the age of 83.

== Literary works ==
- Anaadivaallu
- Kethu Viswanatha Reddy Kathalu (1998 - 2003)
- Verlu - Bodhi (1994)
- Icchagni (1996)
- Japtu (1974)
- Drishti
- Deepadaarulu
- Parichayam
- Patrikeyam
- Sangamam
- Mana Kodavatiganti

== Awards and honours ==
=== For Literature ===
- Sahitya Akademi Award in Telugu, 1996
- Bhartiya Bhasa Parishad 1996 (Calcutta) Award
- Raavi Shastry Award
- 1992 Tummala Venkata Ramaiah Gold Medal for Literature
- 1994 Telugu University Award
- 1995 Pulupula Venkata Sivaiah Award for Literature
- 1996 Humanscape's Short Story Award
- 1999 Visala Sahiti Award
- 2001 Raavi Shastry Award
- 1974 Prize for the Textbooks for Adults
- 1982 Sri Venkateswara University Endowment Prize

=== As Teacher ===
- Best Teacher Award for University Teachers from Government of Andhra Pradesh.
- 1992 - 1993 Recipient of Best Teacher Award for University Teachers
- 1993 Visiting Fellow, Sri Padmavathi Mahila University, Tirupati, A. P.
- 1998 Visiting Fellow, Sri Venkateswara University, Tirupati (A.P.)
- 2000 - 2001 Visiting Fellow, Sri Venkateswara University, Tirupati, (A.P.)
