= Sadique Hossain =

Indian writer and graphic designer

- Born: 11 December 1981 (age 44); Maheshtala, South 24 Parganas, West Bengal, India
- Occupations: Writer, Graphic designer

Sadique Hossain is an Indian writer of Bangla language and graphic designer from West Bengal. He won Yuva Puraskar in 2012.

== Biography ==
Hossain was born on 11 December 1981 in Maheshtala, South 24 Parganas, West Bengal, India. He was a student of Rizwanur Rahman and he was a witness of his marriage too. After that, he was threatened he was asked to write that Rizwanur Rahman forced him to become his marriage witness.

Hossain started writing poems when he was a graduate student and started writing short stories in 2007. For his short story collection Sammohan, he was awarded Yuva Puraskar in 2012.

== Bibliography ==
=== Poetry ===
- Debota O Poshupakhi (2007)

=== Short stories collection ===
- Sammohan (2009)
- Giyas Alir Prem O Tar Nijoswo Somoy (2013)
- Refugee Camp (2017)
- Harur Mahabharat (2019)

=== Novel ===
- Momen O Momena (2010)
