= Ashok Ramchandra Kelkar =

Indian Marathi writer (1929–2014)

- Born: 22 April 1929; Pune, India
- Died: 2014 (aged 84–85)
- Education: Savitribai Phule Pune University, Cornell University
- Occupations: Linguist; Writer; Professor
- Awards: Padma Shri (2002), Sahitya Akademi Award (2010)

Ashok Ramchandra Kelkar (1929–2014) was a linguist and critical Marathi writer from Maharashtra, India. He was honoured with the Padma Shri in 2002 and Sahitya Akademi Award for Marathi in 2010.

== Biography ==
Kelkar was born on 22 April 1929 in Pune. He did his schooling from New English School and then from Ferguson College. As he was fond of grammar and had interest in linguistic puzzles, he graduated from Ferguson in English and Philosophy. He received a master's degree in English and French literature from Pune University. He also studied linguistics (1956–58) from Rockfeller and Comparative Literature and Review from Lily Institute in 1958 and received scholarships there. In the period of 1958–62, he served the Agra University teaching linguistics. During 1962–67, he served as a reader at Pune University, and during the next 22 years, he served as professor of Linguistics and later as director of the Centre of Advanced Studies and Linguistics at Deccan College in Pune. He also had a PhD in Linguistics and Anthropology from Cornell University in the USA. He used to guide the students of linguistics completing their M.Phil. and PhD He took retirement from academics in 1989.

Kelkar founded the Marathi Abhyas Parishad and served as its director. There he started the trimonthly Bhasha Ani Jeewan (भाषा आणि जीवन) in 1982 and served as its editor until 1989.

Kelkar was honored with the Padma Shri from the Indian government in 2002 for his literary accomplishments. In 2008, he received the Sahitya Akademi Award for Marathi for his book Rujuvaat (रूजुवात). His book Prachin Bhartiya Sahitya Mimansa – Ek Aakalan (प्राचिन भारतीय साहित्य मीमांसा – एक आकलन) was translated into Hindi and won a national award.

Kelkar had a son and a daughter. He died on 20 September 2014 at Aurangabad where he lived with his daughter Roshan Ranade since two years.

== Bibliography ==
Marathi

- Vaikhari – Bhasha Aani Bhashavyavhar (वैखरी – भाषा आणि भाषाव्यवहार), Majestic, 1983
- Rujuvaat (रूजुवात), Lokvangmaygruha Pvt. Ltd., 2008
- Kaviteche Adhyapan (कवितेचे अध्यापन), Godavari Prakashan
- Bhedvilopan Ek Aakalan (भेदविलोपन एक आकलन), Pradnyapaathshala Mandal
- Madhyama (मध्यमा), Mehta Publishing House
- Uttam Adhyapanachi Rahasye (उत्तम अध्यापनाची रहस्ये, Secrets of Good Teaching) Diamond Publication, 2012, ISBN 9788184830347
- Aaswad Mimansa (आस्वाद मीमांसा)
- Chinha Mimansa (चिन्ह मीमांसा)
- Sanskrutik Maanav Vidnyan (सांस्कृतिक मानव विज्ञान)
- Triveni (त्रिवेणी)
- Marathi Bhashecha Aarthik Sansar (मराठी भाषेचा आर्थिक संसार)
- Prachin Bhartiya Sahitya Mimansa – Ek Aakalan (प्राचिन भारतीय साहित्य मीमांसा – एक आकलन)

English

- The Phonology and Morphology of Marathi, Cornell University, 1958
- Studies in Hindi-Urdu Language in a Semiotic Perspective, Deccan College, 1968
- From a Semiotic Point of View
- Language in a Semiotic Perspective: The Architecture of a Marathi Sentence, Shubhada-Saraswat Prakashan, 1997, ISBN 8186411259
- The Scope of a Linguistic Survey
- Phonemic and morphophonemic frequency count in Oriya, Central Institute of Indian Languages, 1994
- Prolegomena to an Understanding of Semiosis and Culture, Central Institute of Indian Languages, 1980
