= List of Sahitya Akademi Award winners for Telugu =

List of winners of a literary honor in India

Sahitya Akademi Award for Telugu
- Award for contributions to Telugu literature
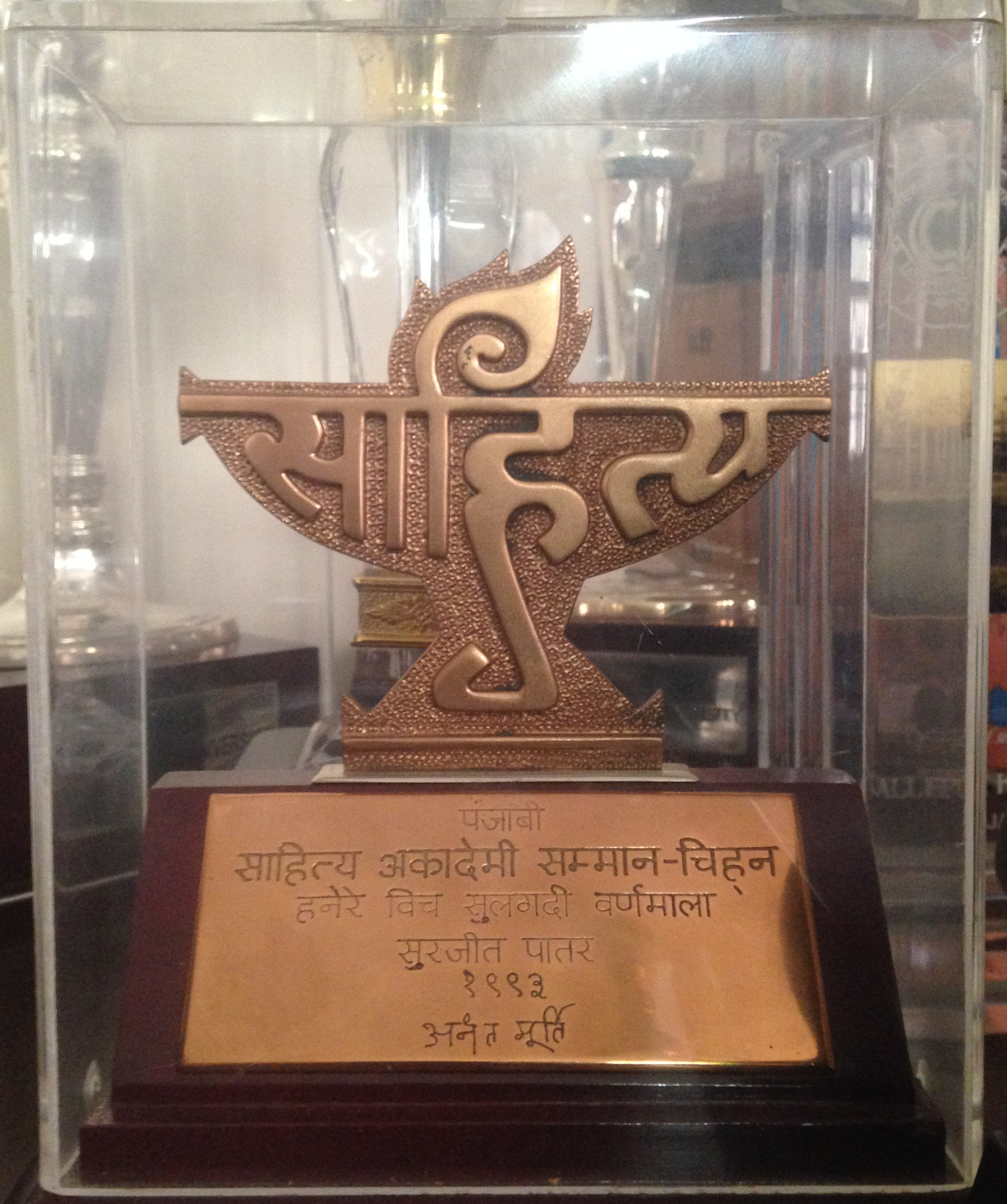
- Awarded for: Literary award in India
- Sponsored by: Sahitya Akademi, Government of India
- Reward: ₹1 lakh (US$1,100)
- First award: 1955
- Final award: 2024

Highlights
- First winner: Suravaram Pratapa Reddy
- Most Recent winner: Penugonda Lakshminarayana
- Total awarded: 65
- Website: Official website

Part of a series on

Sahitya Akademi Awards
Category
Sahitya Akademi Award winners by language
- Assamese
- Bengali
- Bodo
- Dogri
- English
- Gujarati
- Hindi
- Kannada
- Kashmiri
- Konkani
- Maithili
- Malayalam
- Marathi
- Meitei (Manipuri)
- Nepali
- Odia
- Punjabi
- Rajasthani
- Sanskrit
- Santali
- Sindhi
- Tamil
- Telugu
- Urdu
Sahitya Akademi Translation Prizes
- Assamese
- Bengali
- Bodo
- Dogri
- English
- Gujarati
- Hindi
- Kannada
- Kashmiri
- Konkani
- Maithili
- Malayalam
- Marathi
- Meitei (Manipuri)
- Nepali
- Odia
- Punjabi
- Rajasthani
- Sanskrit
- Santali
- Sindhi
- Tamil
- Telugu
- Urdu
Sahitya Akademi Yuva Puraskar
- Assamese
- Bengali
- Bodo
- Dogri
- English
- Gujarati
- Hindi
- Kannada
- Kashmiri
- Konkani
- Maithili
- Malayalam
- Meitei (Manipuri)
- Marathi
- Nepali
- Odia
- Punjabi
- Rajasthani
- Sanskrit
- Santali
- Sindhi
- Tamil
- Telugu
- Urdu
Sahitya Akademi Bal Sahitya Puraskar
- Assamese
- Bengali
- Bodo
- Dogri
- English
- Gujarati
- Hindi
- Kannada
- Kashmiri
- Konkani
- Maithili
- Malayalam
- Meitei (Manipuri)
- Marathi
- Nepali
- Odia
- Punjabi
- Rajasthani
- Sanskrit
- Santali
- Sindhi
- Tamil
- Telugu
- Urdu
Related
- Eighth Schedule to the Constitution of India
- Official Languages Commission
- List of languages by number of native speakers in India

The Sahitya Akademi Award is given to poets and writers for their outstanding contributions to Indian and Telugu literature. It has been given every year since 1955 by the Sahitya Akademi (India's National Academy of Letters).

== Winners ==
Year	Portrait	Author	Work	
1955		Suravaram Pratap Reddy	Andhrula Sanghika Charitamu (	Social History
1956	—	Bulusu Venkateswarlu	Bharatiya Tattva Sastramu (	
1957	—	Swami Chirantanananda	Sri Ramakrishnuni Jeevita Charitra	Biography
1958		No Award		
1959		No Award		
1960	—	Ponangi Srirama Apparavu	Natyasastramu (A History of Bharata's Natyasastra)	History of Bharata's Natya Shastra
1961		Balantrapu Rajanikanta Rao	Andhra Vaggeyakara Charitramu (A History of Telugu composers and songwriters)	History of Telugu composers and song writers
1962		Viswanatha Satyanarayana	Viswanadha Madhyakkarulu (Poetry)	Poetry
1963		Tripuraneni Gopichand	Panditha Parameswara Sastry Veelunama (Novel)	Novel
1964		Gurram Joshua	Kreestu Charitra (Poetry)	Poetry
1965	—	Rayaprolu Subbarao	Misra Manjari (Poetry)	Poetry
1966		No Award		
1967		No Award		
1968		No Award		
1969	—	Tummala Seetharama Murthy	Mahatma Katha (Poetry)	Poetry
1970	—	D. Balagangadhar Tilak	Amrutham Kurisina Rathri (Poetry)	Poetry
1971		Thapi Dharma Rao	Vijayavilasamu: Hrudayollasavyakhya (Commentary)	Commentary
1972		Srirangam Srinivasarao	Sri Sri Sahityamu (Poetry)	Poetry
1973		C. Narayana Reddy	Mantalu Manavudu (Poetry)	Poetry
1974		Dasaradhi	Thimiram Tho Samaram (Poetry)	Poetry
1975	—	Boyi Bhimanna	Gudiselu Kalipotunnai (Poetry)	Poetry
1976		No Award		
1977	—	Kundurti Anjaneyulu	Kundurti Kritulu (Poetry)	Poetry
1978	—	Devulapalli Venkata Krishna Sastry	Collected Works of Krishna Sastri (6 vols.)	Collected works
1979	—	P. Narayanacharya	Janapriya Ramayanamu (Poetry)	Poetry
1980		No Award		
1981	—	Narla Venkateswara Rao	Seeta Josyam (Play)	Play
1982	—	Illindala Saraswati Devi	Swarna Kamalaalu (Short stories)	Short stories
1983		Ravuri Bharadhwaja	Jeevana Samaram (Sketches)	Sketches
1984	—	Aluri Bairagi	Aagama Geeti (Poetry)	Poetry
1985	—	Palagummi Padmaraju	Gaalivana (Short stories)	Short stories
1986	—	G. V. Subramanyam	Andhra Sahitya Vimarsa Angla Prabhavam (Literary criticism)	Literary Criticism
1987		Arudra	Gurazada Gurupeetham (Essays)	Essays
1988	—	Rachamallu Ramachandra Reddi	Anuvaada Samasyalu (Criticism)	Criticism
1989	—	S. V. Joga Rao	Manipravalamu (Essays)	Essays
1990		K. Siva Reddy	Mohana-o-Mohana (Poetry)	Poetry
1991	—	Bhamidipati Ramagopalam	Itlu, Mee Vidheyudu (Short stories)	Short stories
1992		Malathi Chendur	Hrudaya Netri (Novel)	Novel
1993	—	Madhuranthakam Rajaram	Madhuranthakam Rajaram Kathalu (Short stories)	Short stories
1994		Gunturu Seshendra Sharma	Kala Rekha (Criticism)	Criticism
1995		Kalipatnam Ramarao	Yajnam To Tommidi (Short stories)	Short stories
1996	—	Kethu Viswanatha Reddy	Kethu Viswanatha Reddy Kathalu (Short stories)	Short stories
1997	—	Penumarthi Viswanatha Sastri (Ajanta)	Swapna Lipi (Poetry)	Poetry
1998	—	Balivada Kantha Rao	Balivada Kantha Rao Kathalu (Short stories)	Short stories
1999	—	Vallampati Venkata Subbaiah	Katha Silpam (Essays)	Essays
2000		N. Gopi	Kalanni Nidra Ponivvanu (Poetry)	Poetry
2001	—	Tirumala Ramachandra	Hampi Nunchi Harappa Daka (Autobiography)	Autobiography
2002	—	Chekuri Ramarao	Smrti Kinankam (Essays)	Essays
2003	—	Utpala Satyanarayanacharya	Sri Krishna Chandrodayamu (Poetry)	Poetry
2004		Ampasayya Naveen	Kala Rekhalu (Novel)	Novel
2005	—	Abburi Chayadevi	Tana Margam (Short Stories)	Short stories
2006	—	Munipalle Raju	Astitvanadam Aavali Teerana (Short Stories)	Short stories
2007	—	Gadiyaram Ramakrishna Sarma	Satapatramu (Autobiography)	Autobiography
2008	—	Chitiprolu Krishna Murthy	Purushottamudu (Poetry)	Poetry
2009		Yarlagadda Laxmi Prasad	Draupadi (Novel)	Novel
2010	—	Syed Saleem	Kaluthunna Poolathota (Novel)	Novel
2011		Samala Sadasiva	Swaralayalu (Essays)	Essays
2012	—	Peddibhotla Subbaramaiah	Peddibhotla Subbaramaiah Kathalu Vol-1 (Short Stories)	Short stories
2013	—	Katyayani Vidmahe	Sahityaakasamlo Sagam (Essays)	Essays
2014	—	Rachapalem Chandrasekhara Reddy	Mana Navalalu - Mana Kathanikalu (Literary Criticism)	Literary criticism
2015		Volga	Vimuktha (Short Stories)	Short stories
2016		Papineni Sivasankar	Rajanigandha (Poetry)	Poetry
2017	—	Devi Priya	Gaali Rangu (Poetry)	Poetry
2018		Kolakaluri Enoch	Vimarsini (Essay)	Essay
2019		Bandi Narayanaswamy	Sapta Bhoomi (Novel)	Novel
2020	—	Nikhileshwar	Agniswaasa (2015-2017) (Poetry)	Poetry
2021		Goreti Venkanna	Vallanki Taalam (Poetry)	Poetry
2022	—	Madhuranthakam Narendra	Manodharmaparagam (Novel)	Novel
2023	—	T. Patanjali Sastry	Rameswaram Kaakulu Marikonni Kathalu (Short Stories)	Stories
2024	—	Penugonda Lakshminarayana	Deepika (Criticism)	Criticism
2025		Nandini Sidha Reddy	Animesha	Poetry

Bala Sahitya puraskar winners and their works in Telugu language

Year	Author	Work
2010	Kaluvakolanu Sadananda	Adavi Thalli (Children's Novel)
2011	M. Bhoopal Reddy	Uggupaalu (Children short stories)
2013	D. Sujatha Devi	Aatalo Aratipandu (Stories)

== See also ==
- List of Sahitya Akademi Translation Prize winners for Telugu
