= Kundurti Anjaneyulu =

- Born: 16 December 1922; Kotavaripalem, Guntur district
- Died: 1982 (aged 59–60)
- Citizenship: India
- Education: Andhra Christian College, Guntur (B.A.)
- Spouse: Sundaramma
- Writing career
- Genre: Writer
- Notable work: Kundurti Kritulu
- Notable awards: Sahitya Akademi Award

Kundurti Anjaneyulu (Telugu: కుందుర్తి ఆంజనేయులు) (16 December 1922 – 1982) was a Telugu poet. He was a winner of the Sahitya Akademi Award. He is also known as "Vachana Kavitha Pitamahudu" (Father of prose poetry).

== Literary works ==
- Souptikam
- Rasadhuni
- Amavaasya
- Naa Preyasi
- Nayaagara
- Telangana
- Dandi Yaatra
- Asha
- Nagaramlo Vaana
- Naaloni Vaadaalu
- Hamsa Egiripoyindi
- Teera Nenu Kaasta Egiripoyaaka
- Meghamaala
- Idi Naa Jenda
- Kundurti Peethikalu
- Kundurti Vyaasaalu
- Batuku Maata

== Awards ==
- Recipient of Sahitya Akademi Award to Telugu Writers in 1977.

== Free Verse Trust ==
The group, "Free Verse Front", was founded by him and has been giving prizes since 1967. Free Verse Front Prize Trust was founded on 31 July 1979 in Hyderabad.
