= Syed Saleem =

- Born: Ongole, Andhra Pradesh, India
- Citizenship: Indian
- Occupations: Writer, novelist
- Awards: Sahitya Akademi Award,2010

Syed Saleem is a Telugu writer. He has written thirty eight novels, about 350 short stories and more than 150 poems. His fiction has been translated into English, Hindi, Marathi, Oriya, Malayalam, Kannada, Kosli and Tamil languages. His work is characterised by his humanitarianism and poetic expression. His novel Kaluthunna Poolathota won the Sahitya Akademi Award in Telugu, 2010.

== Early life ==
Saleem was born in Throvagunta village near Ongole. He began writing poetry while in school. He earned an M.Sc. (Tech) degree from Andhra University.

== Career ==
Saleem began writing short fiction in 1980; his first story was "Manishi". His stories have been adapted as a television serial, Saleem Kathalu, which has aired on the Telugu language television channel DD Yadagiri. One of his stories, "Aaro Alludu" has been included in the second volume of World Best Stories, published by Bangalore University.

'Abhyudaya Sahiti Puraskaram' was presented to him in 2012 at the cultural festival ‘Sampradaya Sanskritika Vaibhavam-4'.

Many of Saleem's stories have been translated into Kannada, Hindi, Oriya and Marathi. Twenty selected stories were translated into English and published as Ocean and Other Stories by Prism Publications, Bangalore. Another twenty stories were published as Three Dimensions and Other Stories, also by Prism Publications. His novels Vendimegham and Kaluthunna Poolathota have been translated into several languages.

Saleem works as an additional commissioner of income tax in Nagpur.

== Works ==
=== Published poetry collections ===
- Neeloki Choosina Gnapakam, 1999
- Aakulu Raale Drusyam, 2005
- Vishada Varnam, 2013

=== Collections of short stories ===
- Swathi Chinukulu, 1996
- Nissabda Sangeetham, 1999
- Roopayi Chettu, 2004
- Chadarapu Yenugu, 2006
- Raanigari Kathalu, 2008
- Ontari Sareeram, 2009
- Rekkala Harivillu, 2011
- Antarganam, 2014
- Neeti Putta, 2017
- Maya Jalatharu, 2018
- Needa, 2023
- Evariki Telusu?, 2024
- Budidarangu Aakasam, 2026
- Gulabi Rangu Roddu, 2026
- Bahumati Kathalu, 2026

=== Novels ===
- Jeevanmrutulu, 2001
- Vendimegham, 2003
- Kanchana Mrugam, 2006
- Kalutuhunna Poolathota, 2006
- Padaga Needa, 2009
- Marana kanksha, 2012
- Gurrapu dekka, 2013
- Anoohya Pelli, 2013
- Anaamika Diary, 2014
- Aranyaparvam, 2015
- Kaavyanjali, 2016
- Mounaraagam, 2016
- Aparaajita, 2016
- Medha 017, 2017
- Anveshana, 2017
- Doodipinjalu, 2017
- Little Julie, 2017
- Edari Poolu, 2018
- Garbhagudi, 2018
- Pagadapu Deevi, 2018
- Guhalo Okaroju, 2019
- Padileche Keratam, 2019
- Operation Kitin, 2019
- Rendu Aakasala Madhya, 2020
- Manogna, 2020
- Angaraka Graham Meeda Antima Vijayam, 2021
- Lopali Vidhwamsam, 2021
- Mission Epiticia, 2022
- Loha Mudra, 2023
- Cheekati Chivarna Velturu, 2023
- Chandruniko Noolupogu, 2024
- Voorul Lenollu, 2024
- Ekantha Samoohalu, 2024
- Grahanthara Anveshana,2024
- Andamaina Kanuka, 2025
- Formula D 2025
- Rendo Jeevitham,2025
- Voodarngu samudram, 2026

=== Works in translation ===
Original title	Original year of publication	Translated title	Language translated to	Translator	Year translation published
Kaluthunna Poolathota	2006	NayeeImarath Ke Khandhar	Hindi	Śāntā Sundarī	2009
Stories in Telugu		Ocean and Other Stories	English	Bhargavi Rao and Sujatha Gopal	2009
Stories in Telugu		Teen Baju Aani Itara Gosthi	Marathi	Kamalakara Dharap	2013
Stories in Telugu		Ocean and Other Stories	English	Bhargavi Rao and Sujatha Gopal	2009
Stories in Telugu		Talaaq AaniItara Katha	Marathi	Kamalakara Dharap	2015
Stories in Telugu		Kāḍuva kategaḷu	Kannada	Devakavi Na Dhanapala	2014
Telugu Stories		Three Dimensions and Other Stories	English	Sujatha Gopal	2009
Veṇḍi mēghaṃ	2003	Sunahara Baadal	Hindi	Kommiśeṭṭi Mohana	2010
Veṇḍi mēghaṃ	2004	Soneri Megh	Marathi	Makarand Kulakarni	2013
Kaluthunna Poolathota	2006	Silent Storm	English	P. Jayalaxmi	2011
Kaluthunna Poolathota	2006	Uriya Tiruva Hobana	Kannada	G. Veerabhadra Gowda	2018
Gurrapuḍekka	2013	A Dove from the Hillock	English	P. Jayalaxmi	2016
Gurrapuḍekka	2013	Jangal Ke Phool	Hindi	Kommiśeṭṭi Mohana	2017
Padaga Needa	2010	Shadow of Hood	English	S.V. Subba Rao	2016
Jeevanmruthulu	2001	Jeevanmrutaru	English	Devakavi Na Dhanapala	2017
Maranakanksha	2012	Maran Detaka Koyi	Marathi	Kamalakara Dharap	2016
Maranakanksha	2012	Marana kankshe	Kannada	G. Veerabhadra Gowda	
Maranakanksha	2012	A Desire for Death	English	Syed Saleem	2013
Rāṇīgāri kathalu	2008	Sunahari Dhoop	Hindi	Śāntā Sundarī	2014
Rāṇīgāri kathalu	2008	Ranichi Gosthi	Marathi	Kamalakara Dharap	2016
Rāṇīgāri kathalu	2008	A Ray of Sunshine	English	P. Jayalaxmi	2017
Rāṇīgāri kathalu	2008	Rani Kathe Galu	Kannada	G. Veerabhadra Gowda	
Anūhya peḷḷi	2016	Seven Steps to Your Heart	English	R. H. Saraswati	2018
Anamika Diary	2018	Soaring on Broken Wings	English	Syed Saleem	2018
Medha 017	2017	Medha 017	Kannada	Devakavi Na Dhanapala	2018
Aparajitha	2017	Aparajitha	Kannada	Devakavi Na Dhanapala	2018
Eḍāri pūlu	2018	Deserted Flowers	English	Indira Bobbelapati	2020
Eḍāri pūlu	2018	Registhan Ke Phool	Hindi	Kommiśeṭṭi Mohana	2021
Eḍāri pūlu	2018	Udhwastha Asiyana	Marathi	Kamalakara Dharap	2021
Aranyaparvam	2019	Struggling to Survive	English	Indrasena Reddy Kancharla	2021
Lopali Vidhwamsam	2021	Devastation Within	English	Indrasena Reddy Kancharla	2022
Reṇḍu ākāśāla madhya	2022	Two Skies	English	Indrasena Reddy Kancharla	2022
Reṇḍu ākāśāla madhya	2022	Do ākāśa	Hindi	Kommiśeṭṭi Mohana	2022
Paḍilēcē keraṭaṃ	2020	Fall and Rise of a Tidal Wave	English	Indrasena Reddy Kancharla	2023

== Awards ==
- Sahitya Akademi Award in Telugu for the novel Kaaluthunna Poolathota in the year 2010.
- Saahitee Award from Potti Sreeramulu Telugu University for the novel Vendimegham in 2005
- Raashtriya Vikas Shiromani Award from Delhi Telugu Akademy in 2005
- Bhasha Puraskaram from the Government of Andhra Pradesh in 2003
- Madabhushi Rangachari Award for Roopayi Chettu in 2003
- Dhrmanidhi Puraskaram from Potti Sreeramulu Telugu University for short stories
- Chaso Literary Award in 2008 for storywriting
- Vasireddy Sitadevi Sahitya Puraskaram for novel writing in 2007
- Kovvali Literary Award for novel writing in 2009
- Nayee Imaarat Ke Khandhar, the Hindi version of the novel Kaluthunna Poolathota, won the National Human Rights Commission of India Award in 2009
