= Mahesh Champaklal =

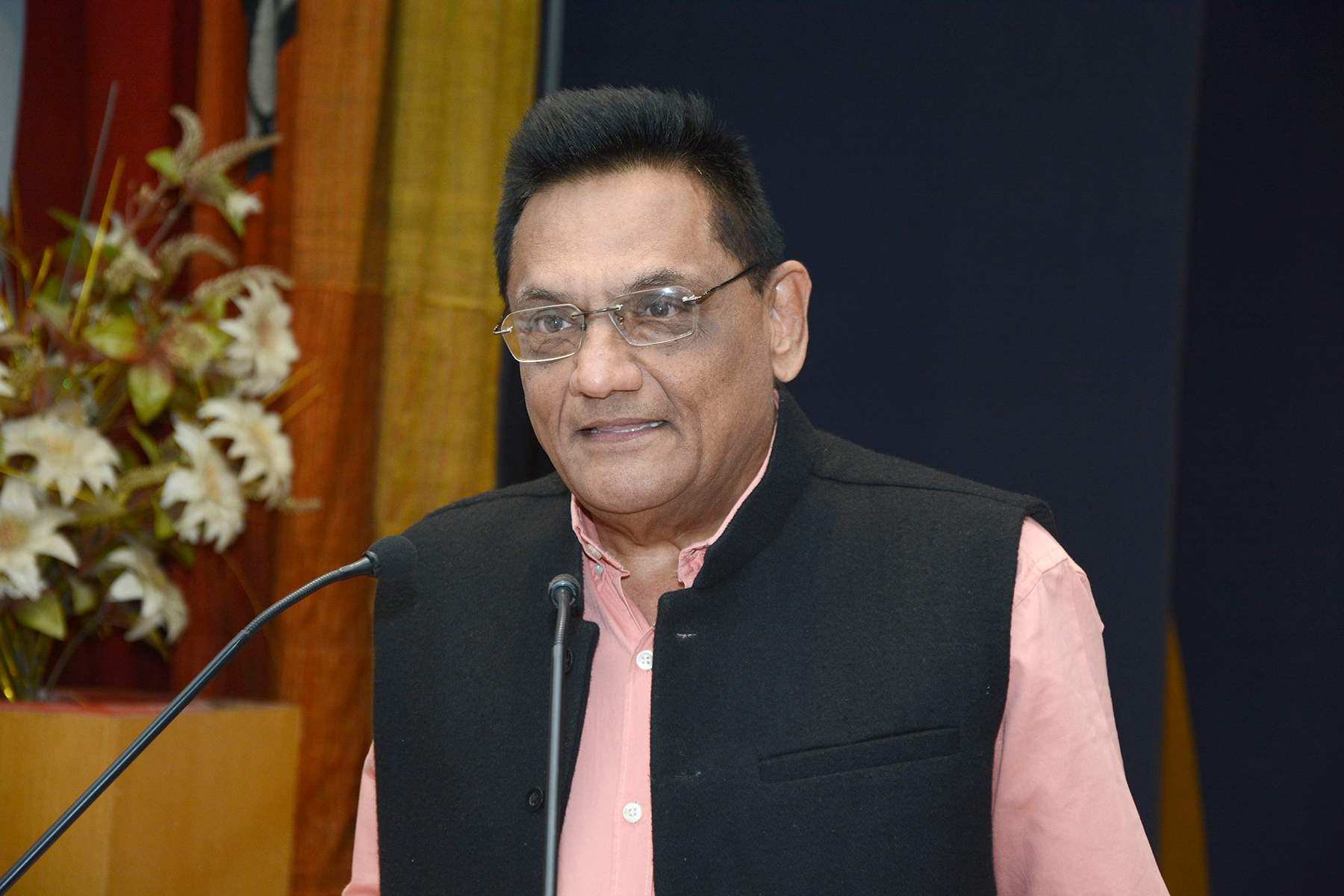
- Champaklal at Gujarat Vishwakosh Trust, January 2018
- Born: 25 October 1951 (age 74); Mbale, Uganda, East Africa
- Occupations: Dramatist, stage actor and director
- Writing career
- Language: Gujarati

Signature
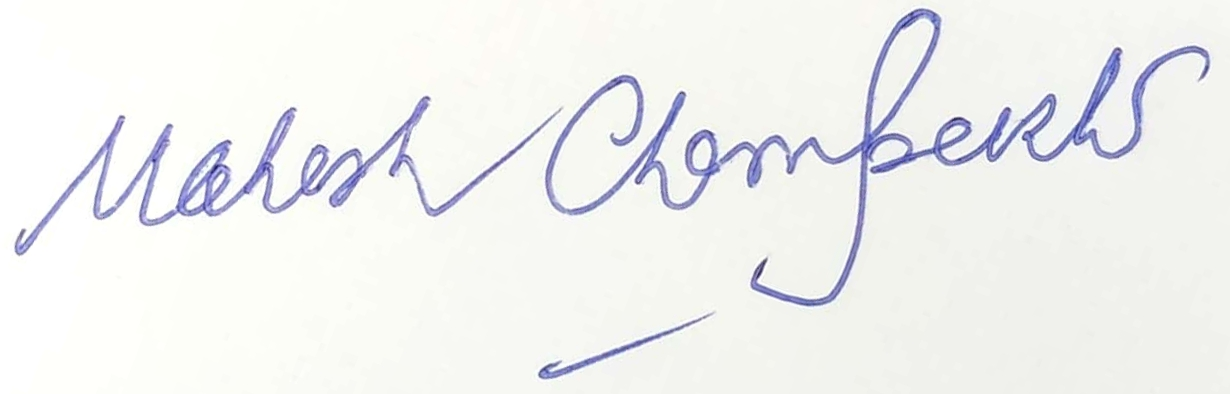

Mahesh Champaklal (born 25 October 1951) is an Indian dramatist, stage actor and director from Gujarat, India. After working for some years in the commercial Gujarati theatre, he joined and taught dramatics at the Maharaja Sayajirao University of Baroda.

== Biography ==
Mahesh Champaklal was born in Mbale in East Africa.

He was associated with the commercial Gujarati theatre in Bombay (now Mumbai) from 1973 to 1981. He acted in plays produced by the Indian National Theatre and the Bahuroopi working with several directors including Pravin Joshi, Arvind Joshi, Vijay Dutt, Vishnukumar Vyas.

He left the commercial theatre and in 1981 joined Maharaja Sayajirao University of Baroda (M. S. University) as a professor of dramatics. In 1987, he received a PhD in dramatics for his thesis on Bharatmunino Abhinaysiddhant from the M. S. University. In 1996, he also received a PhD in Gujarati literature for his thesis Natakma Bhasha (Language in Plays). He served as the head of the Department of Dramatics (1995-1999, 2003-) as well as the Dean of the Faculty of Performing Arts (2002-2003, 2005-). Along with studies and teaching, he was active as a writer, actor and director in the experimental theatre. He acted in several acclaimed productions including Paritran, Shatkhand, Raktabeej, Chhadechwok, Kayapalat, Maladevi, Moksh, Snehadheen, Parakh, Agni Ane Varsad, Param Maheshwar and Sikandar Sani. His role of Amir Khusrow in Sikandar Sani was appreciated and the play was performed at various state level and national level stage festivals. For directing Grahan, written by Sitanshu Yashaschandra, he was selected as a Young Stage Talent by the Sangeet Natak Akademi.

His Bharat Natyashastra - Abhinay, Bharat Natyashastra - Natyaprayog and Bharat Natyashastra - Adhunik Sandarbho are published by the University Granth Nirman Board. These works were awarded by the Gujarati Sahitya Parishad. His Adhunik Gujarati Natak: Prat Ane Prayog and Rangdwar were awarded by the Gujarat Sahitya Akademi. He translated Girish Karnad's play The Fire and the Rain in Gujarati as Agni Ane Varsad which received the Sahitya Akademi Translation Prize, as well as the translation prize from the Gujarat Sahitya Akademi. He was awarded Best Stage Actor by the Gujarat Sangeet Natak Akademi for his performance as Kapil in the play Hayvadan directed by Jagdish Bhatt. He also received the Jayshankar 'Sundari' Award for this. Later he served as a member of the Gujarat Sangeet Natak Akademi from 1992 to 1998. He was a Fellow of the Indian Institute of Advanced Study from 2014 to 2016.

== See also ==
- List of Gujarati-language writers
