= Vishwas Patil =

Indian author and historian

- Born: 28 November 1959 (age 66); Nerle, Kolhapur, India
- Citizenship: Indian
- Education: Shivaji University (M.A. L.L.B)
- Occupations: Writer, IAS Officer
- Works: • Zadazadati • Panipat • Mahanayak • Chandramukhi
- Awards: Sahitya Akademi Award (1992)

Vishwas Patil (born 28 November 1959) is an Indian author and an officer in the Indian Administrative Service. He was born in the village of Nerle in Kolhapur district. He completed his MA in literature from Shivaji University Kolhapur. He completed his masters M.A. in English Literature and a degree in Law.

== Works ==
- Lust for Lalbaug, novel about the Great Bombay textile strike, published by Rajhans Prakashan, 2015
- Panipat, novel about the Third Battle of Panipat
- Sambhaji, biographical novel about Sambhaji
- Ranangan, play based on novel Panipat
- Chandramukhi, novel based on relations between a politician and a "tamasha" dancer
- Not gone with the wind, novel based on the film industry personalities
- Pangira, novel about hardship of village people
- Mahanayak, biographical novel about Netaji Subhash Chandra Bose
- Zadazadati (novel), a touching story of people displaced due to infrastructure projects like dams, awarded the Sahitya Akademi Award in 1992,

== Awards ==
- 1989 Nath Madhav Award for Panipat
- 1990 Priyadarshini National Award for Zadazadati, Bhartiya Bhasha Parishad Award for Panipat, Vikhe Patil Award for Zadazadati
- 1992 Sahitya Akademi Award for Zadazadati
- 1998 Gadakri Award for Mahanayak
- 2026 Presidentship of 99th Akhil Bharatiya Marathi Sahitya Sammelan at Satara
