= Satilal Murmu =

Santali writer and Yuva Puraskar recipient

Satilal Murmu is a Santali language Indian writer. He received the Sahitya Akademi Yuva Puraskar in 2011 for his work Jagron.

== Awards ==
- Sahitya Akademi Yuva Puraskar (2011) – for Jagron (Santali)
