= Shyam Charan Tudu =

Santali writer and Yuva Sahitya Akademi Award recipient

- ᱥᱭᱟᱢ ᱪᱚᱨᱚᱬ ᱴᱩᱰᱩ
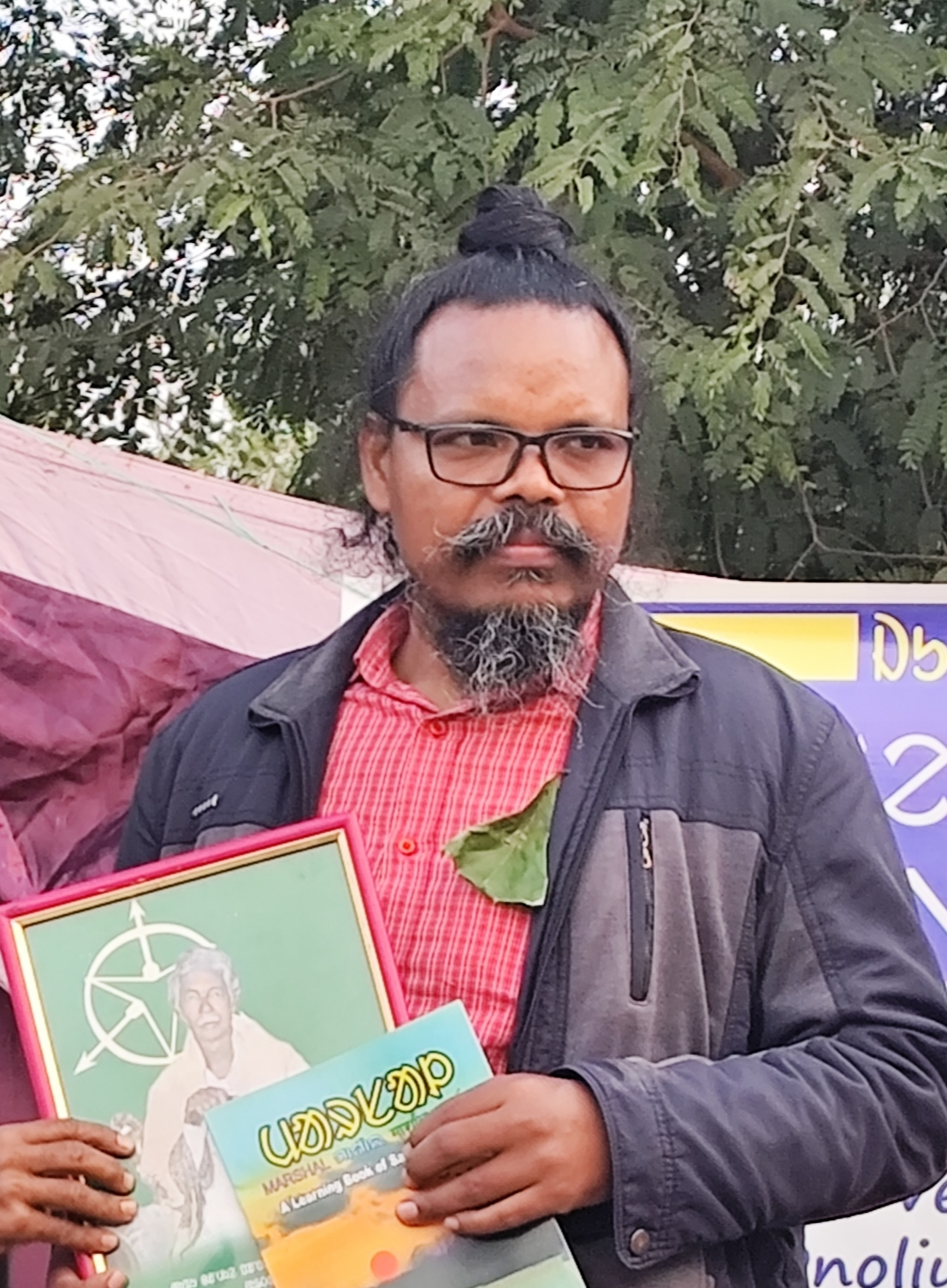
- Born: Jharkhand, India
- Occupation: Writer
- Writing career
- Language: Santali
- Genre: Poetry
- Notable works: Jala Dak, Olchiki Chemed
- Notable awards: Yuva Sahitya Akademi Award (2011)

Shyam Charan Tudu is an Indian Santali writer. He received Sahitya Akademi Yuva Puraskar in 2012 for his poetry collection Jala Dak.

== Early life ==
Shyam Charan Tudu hails from Dabanki village in the East Singhbhum district of Jharkhand, India

== Awards ==
- Sahitya Akademi Yuva Puraskar in 2011 for poetry collection Jala Dak.

== See also ==
- Santali literature
- Ol Chiki script
- Sahitya Akademi
