= Asaram Lomate =

Indian Marathi-language writer

Aasaram Lomate
- Born: Guguli Dhamangaon, Taluka Selu, District Parbhani, (Maharashtra, India)
- Education: Ph.D
- Occupation: Journalist
- Writing career
- Language: Marathi
- Genre: Short story
- Notable works: इडा पिडा टळो (कथासंग्रह, २०१०), आलोक (कथासंग्रह २०१०), धूळपेर (लेखसंग्रह, २०१७)
- Notable awards: Sahitya Academy Award

Aasaram Lomate, is a Marathi-language writer. He resides in Parbhani and works as a journalist in daily Loksatta.

He was awarded with Sahitya Akademi Award in 2016 for his short story collection Aalok. Published in 2010, Alok is a collection of six stories that largely reflect rural life and people.
