= Mahanayak (novel) =

2005 novel by Vishvas Patil

- Author: Vishvas Patil
- Original title: महानायक
- Language: Marathi
- Subject: Non-fiction
- Genre: Biographical, Historical novel
- Publisher: Rajhans Prakashan
- Publication date: 2005
- Publication place: India
- English publication date: 2005
- Media type: Print
- Pages: 800

Mahanayak (Marathi: महानायक, romanized: mahānāyak, lit. 'Great Hero') is a Marathi historical novel on the life of Subhas Chandra Bose, written by prominent Marathi author Vishvas Patil. This novel is translated into many other Indian and foreign languages.
