= Asha Bage =

Indian writer

- Occupation: writer
- Writing career
- Language: Marathi
- Notable work: Bhoomi
- Notable awards: Sahitya Akademi Award

Asha Bage (born 28 July 1939) is a Marathi writer of short-stories and novels. She has published 7 novels, 13 collections of short stories, and two collections of literary works. She is famous for writing about the experiences and emotions of the middle-class Marathi women.

Her novel Bhoomi based on the 2004 Tsunami devastations in India earned her the Sahitya Akademi Award for Marathi for the year 2006. She also received the Janasthan Puraskar from Kusumagraj Pratishthan in Nashik which is given to litterateurs for their contribution to the field of Marathi literature. In 2004, she was chosen as the president of the first Lekhika Sammelan (Women Writers' Conference) organized by the Vidarbha Sahitya Sangh.

== Early life and education ==
Asha Bage was born to Waman Deshpande and Kusum Deshpande in Nagpur. She attended New English High School in Mahal, Nagpur. Later, she attended Lady Amrutbai Daga College in Nagpur where she obtained the Master of Arts degree in Marathi and Music.

== Selected works ==
=== Books of short stories ===
- Marwa (1984)
- Attar (1986)
- Pooja (1989)
- Chandan (1993)
- Mandav (1993)
- Anant (1994)
- Darpan (1997)
- Nisatlele (1999)
- Rutuvegale (1999)
- Pani (2003)
- Paulvatevaral Gaon (2005)
- Pratidvandvi (2005)

=== Novels ===
- Manasvini (1979)
- Zumbar (1984)
- Utsav (1994)
- Tridal (1994)
- Dharmakshetre-Kurukshetre (1996)
- Setu (2000)
- Bhoomi (2004)
