= Sutapa Chakraborty =

- Born: 1991 (age 34–35)
- Citizenship: India
- Writing career
- Language: Bengali
- Notable works: Deraje Halud Ful, Gatajanma
- Notable awards: Sahitya Akademi Yuva Puraskar; 2024

Sutapa Chakraborty is a Bengali poet. She is the first person from Assam to receive the Yuva Puraskar for literary work in Bengali language.

Chakraborty was honored with the Yuva Puraskar by Sahitya Akademi in 2024 for her poetry collection Deraje Halud Ful, Gatajanma.

== Education life ==
Chakraborty completed her undergraduate studies in Bengali literature from Karimganj College under Assam University and obtained Bachelor of Arts. She felt drawn to poetry from her college days. Later, she did her Postgraduate studies from Assam University. After focusing on research, she obtained her doctorate in 2022.

== Works ==
Sutapa Chakraborty developed an interest in poetry from the time she was studying in college. Her works of poetry published are Bhramarayan, Mayabidya and Deraje Halud Ful, Gatajanma. The poems of Mayabidya are written in sonnet-poetic form, which is a collection of hundred sonnets. Deraje Halud Ful, Gatajanma was published by Kolkata-based Adam Publications in 2022; most of the poems were written during the COVID-19 pandemic.
