= Laxman Mane =

Marathi writer

- Born: 1 June 1949 (age 77)
- Occupations: Writer, social activist.
- Works: Upara
- Spouse: Shashi Mane
- Awards: • Sahitya Akademi Award (1981) • Padma Shri (2009)

Laxman Bapu Mane (born 1 June 1949) is a Marathi writer and a social activist from Maharashtra, India. Mane came to sudden fame after publishing his autobiography Upara (An Outsider), in 1980. Upara was considered as a milestone in Marathi Dalit literature and received Sahitya Akademi Award in 1981 and Padma Shri in 2009. He is a former member of Maharashtra's legislative council.

== Early life ==
Mane was born on 1 June 1949 in a small village Somanthali, Phaltan (Maharashtra) in a nomadic tribe in India. He wrote his autobiography (Upara) in 1980, for which he received the Sahitya Akadami award in 1981.

== After Upara ==
His autobiography Upara (उपरा) brought to the attention of the public in Maharashtra the problems of nomadic tribes arising out of their social and economic conditions. Under a two-year grant from the Ford Foundation for field work among nomadic tribes in Maharashtra, Mane wrote in 1984 his second book Band Darwaja (Closed door, 1984).

== Conversion to Buddhism ==
Mane converted to Buddhism along with his followers from his community.

He received a Homi Bhabha Fellowship during 1986-88 for his continued social work.

Mane served for some time in the following capacities:

- Acting President of the- Indian Institute for research in the developmental problems of nomadic and denotified communities, Satara
- Secretary of- Bhartiya bhatke vimukt vikas va sanshodhan sanstha
- General secretary of- Mahatma Jyotirao Phule Samata Pratishthan
- A Senator- of Shivaji University's administration.

Mane is the president of the- Bhatkya Ani Vimukth Jamati Sanghatana, Maharashtra, and a founder member of the Yashwantrao Chavan Pratishthan. ......

== Allegations of sexual exploitation ==
A case was registered against Mane for allegedly sexually exploiting three women employees of a residential school. He is the working president of the organisation that runs this school. He was accused of having sex with them in return of providing them permanent employment in the establishment, or under threats of transferring the employees to another location. This exploitation took place between 2003 and 2010. Subsequent to the registration of this case, three more women registered similar complaints against him. Mane was absconding since 5 March 2013 the day the first two complaints were filed against him. After rejection of his anticipatory bail plea Mane surrendered to the police on 8 April 2013. On 9 April, Mane was remanded to police custody. Mane has appealed to the state's high court seeking that charges against him be squashed, claiming that he has been falsely implicated.
