= Manabendra Bandyopadhyay =

Indian writer (1938–2020)

Manabendra Bandyopadhyay (1938–2020) was an Indian writer and translator, best known for his translations of Latin American literature and world poetry into the Bengali language. He was born in 1938 in Sylhet (in modern Bangladesh) and studied comparative literature at Jadavpur University under the tutelage of Buddhadev Bose. He later taught at Jadavpur.

== Works ==
Among the many authors he translated into Bengali are:

- Gabriel García Márquez
- Juan Rulfo
- Alejo Carpentier
- Nicanor Parra
- Jules Verne
- Aime Cesaire
- Hans Magnus Enzensberger
- Stanislav Lem
- Edward Lear
- Arthur Conan Doyle
- La Fontaine
- Edward Bond
- Charles Perrault
- Miroslav Holub
- Edgar Allan Poe
- Czeslaw Milosz

== Death ==
He died from COVID-19 complications in 2020. He is survived by his daughter, Kaushalya Bannerji.
