= Upara =

Marathi autobiography published in 1980

- Author: Laxman Mane
- Original title: उपरा
- Cover artist: Subhash Awchat
- Language: Marathi language
- Genre: Autobiography
- Publisher: Granthali
- Publication date: 1980
- Media type: Print
- ISBN: 978-8-126-00231-3

Upara (Marathi: उपरा meaning outsider) is an autobiography written by Laxman Mane, a writer who lives in the state of Maharashtra, India. It is written in the Marathi language. It was first published in 1980. It has been translated into English by A. K. Kamat and titled "Upara - An Outsider". Arjun Dangle sees it as a remarkable example of a "Dalit" autobiography. It finds mention in Encyclopaedia of Indian Literature under the genre Autobiography (Marathi). It has won the Sahitya Academy Award for the year 1981. According to Braj B. Kachru et al. it is a path breaking work in the domain of Marathi literature. The Cambridge Companion to Modern Indian Culture (2012) considers it to be a "landmark publication".
