= Jyoti Bhusan Chaki =

Indian linguist

- Born: 1925; Dinajpur, British India (Present Bangladesh)
- Died: March 27, 2008 (aged 82–83); Kolkata, India
- Occupations: Teacher, writer
- Known for: Polyglot
- Spouse: Prakriti Chaki (m. 1946)
- Parent(s): Ahibhushan Chaki (Father); Jyotsnarani Chaki (Mother)
- Awards: Vidyasagar Award (2003); Sahitya Akademi Award (2006)

Jyoti Bhushan Chaki (1925 – 27 March 2008) was an Indian Bengali linguist, academic and polyglot. He had proficiency with 18 different languages.

== Biography ==
Jyoti Bhushan Chaki was born in 1925 at his maternal home in the Dinajpur district, now located in Bangladesh. His father’s name was Ahibhushan Chaki, and his mother’s name was Jyotsnarani Chaki.. He came Kolkata for education in 1945. At first Chaki worked as a teacher in Modern School in 1954. Then he worked as a teacher in a school of Kolkata named Jagadbandhu Institution. He wrote several books on linguistic. He had proficiency with 18 different languages. He was also a member of Akademi Banan Upo-Samiti or Akademi Spelling Sub-Committee. He died on 27 March 2008 in a hospital in Kolkata following brain haemorrhage.

== Bibliography ==
- Bangla Bhashar Byakoron (in Bengali) Ananda Publishers
- Bagortho koutuk (in Bengali) Ananda Publishers
- Ek Jhank Golpo: Arabi, Pharshi o Sanskrit Chirayata Kahini ISBN 9787012400028

== Recognitions ==
- Vidyasagar award
- Bhasha Bhushan from Bharatiya Bhasha Parishad
- Honorary D Litt from Jadavpur University

== See also ==
- Ziad Fazah
