= Sharchchandra Muktibodh =

Marathi Poet

Sharchchandra Muktibodh (1921 – 21 November 1984) was a Marathi poet, novelist and literary critic from Maharashtra, India.

== Biography ==
Muktibodh was born in 1921. He completed his Master of Arts in 1947 from Nagpur University. He started his career as a deputy director in the language department of government. In 1957, he joined Nagpur Mahavidyalaya as a lecturer, from where he retired in 1979.

Muktibodh died on 21 November 1984. His elder brother Gajanan Madhav Muktibodh was also a poet and writer of Hindi literature.

== Literary works ==
=== Novels ===
- Sarahadda (सरहद्द)
- Jan He Wolatu Jethe (जन हे वोळतु जेथे)
- Kshipra (क्षिप्रा)

=== Collections of poems ===
- Nawi Malawat (नवी मळवाट)
- Satyachi Jat (सत्याची जात)
- Yatrik (यात्रिक)
- Muktibodhanchi Niwadak Kavita (मुक्तिबोधांची निवडक कविता)

== Awards ==
Muktibodh received the Sahitya Akademi Award in 1979 for his critical work Srushti, Saundarya Ani Sahityamoolya (सृष्टि, सौंदर्य आणि साहित्यमूल्य).
