= Nanda (surname) =

Nanda is an Indian surname. It is found among the Khatris of Punjab (mostly from the Pothohar and Hazara regions) and the Brahmins of Odisha.

Notable people bearing the surname, who may or may not be associated with the clan, include:

- Agastya Nanda (born 2000), Indian actor
- Ajay Nanda (born 1967), Indian politician
- Ananya Nanda, Indian playback singer and winner of Indian Idol Junior
- Ashish Nanda, Director of IIM Ahmedabad
- Bal Ram Nanda (1917–2010), Indian historian and biographer
- Biddanda Chengappa Nanda (1931–2018), Indian Army General
- Chetanya Nanda (born 1979), Indian cricketer
- Govind Nanda (born 2001), American tennis player
- Gulshan Nanda (1929–1985), Indian novelist and screenwriter
- Gulzarilal Nanda (1898–1998), former Indian Prime Minister
- Har Prasad Nanda (1917–1999), Indian automotive industrialist
- Ishwar Chander Nanda (1892–1965), Indian academic and dramatist, father of Punjabi drama
- Jimmy Nanda, Indian actress and model, Mrs India 2007
- Kiranmoy Nanda (born 1944), politician
- Meera Nanda (born 1954), Indian writer, historian and philosopher of science
- Nabin Nanda, Indian politician
- Nikhil Nanda (born 1974), Indian businessman, Joint Managing Director of Escorts Group
- Pintu Nanda (1977–2023), Indian actor
- Prashanta Nanda (born 1947), movie actor from Odisha
- Ramakrushna Nanda (1906–1994), Indian writer in the Odia language
- Ratish Nanda (born 1973), Indian conservation architect
- Ravindra Nanda (born 1943), HOD of Craniofacial Sciences at Division of Orthodontics
- Sanjeev Nanda, son of Suresh Nanda and grandson of SM Nanda, accused in the 1999 Delhi hit-and-run case
- Sardarilal Mathradas Nanda (1915–2009), Indian Navy Admiral
- Seema Nanda, American government official
- Seema Nanda, Indian mathematician
- Serena Nanda (born 1938), American author and anthropologist
- Shweta Bachchan Nanda (born 1974), Indian author, journalist and model
- Suresh Nanda (born 1941), Indian businessman and retired Lieutenant Commander in the Indian Navy
- Srabani Nanda (born 1991), Indian sprinter
- Swati Nanda, Indian actress and model
- Vartika Nanda, Indian journalist and campaigner
- Ved Prakash Nanda (1934–2024), Indian American academic
- William Nanda-Bissell (born 1966), Chairman at FabIndia
