= SHL =

SHL may refer to:

== Industry ==
- SHL Medical, a Swiss medical technology company
- SHL (motorcycle), a Polish motorcycle brand from 1938 to 1970
- Huta Ludwików (often abbreviated SHL), a Polish manufacturer of metal parts

== Sports ==
- Supreme Hockey League
- Southern Hockey League (disambiguation)
- Slovak Hockey League (Slovak: Slovenská hokejová liga), the second highest ice hockey league in Slovakia
- Swedish Hockey League (Swedish: Svenska hockeyligan), the highest ice hockey league in Sweden
- Swiss Handball League (German: Swiss Handball League), the two highest handball leagues in Switzerland

== Transportation ==
- Shillong Airport, IATA code SHL, Meghalaya, India
- Siu Hong stop, MTR station code SHL, Hong Kong
- Southern Highlands Line, an intercity rail service in New South Wales, Australia

== Other ==
- The x86 command for shift left
- Sacred Himalayan Landscape (SHL), a conservation area located mostly in Nepal
- Schmidt hammer lassen, a Danish architecture firm
- Senate House Libraries, a former grouping of academic libraries in Bloomsbury, London, in existence from 2011 to 2013
- Student Homophile League (SHL), former name of Columbia Queer Alliance, Columbia University, New York City, U.S.
