= List of Sahitya Akademi Translation Prize winners for Meitei =

List of winners of a literary honor in India

Part of a series on

Sahitya Akademi Awards
Category
Sahitya Akademi Award winners by language
- Assamese
- Bengali
- Bodo
- Dogri
- English
- Gujarati
- Hindi
- Kannada
- Kashmiri
- Konkani
- Maithili
- Malayalam
- Marathi
- Meitei (Manipuri)
- Nepali
- Odia
- Punjabi
- Rajasthani
- Sanskrit
- Santali
- Sindhi
- Tamil
- Telugu
- Urdu
Sahitya Akademi Translation Prizes
- Assamese
- Bengali
- Bodo
- Dogri
- English
- Gujarati
- Hindi
- Kannada
- Kashmiri
- Konkani
- Maithili
- Malayalam
- Marathi
- Meitei (Manipuri)
- Nepali
- Odia
- Punjabi
- Rajasthani
- Sanskrit
- Santali
- Sindhi
- Tamil
- Telugu
- Urdu
Sahitya Akademi Yuva Puraskar
- Assamese
- Bengali
- Bodo
- Dogri
- English
- Gujarati
- Hindi
- Kannada
- Kashmiri
- Konkani
- Maithili
- Malayalam
- Meitei (Manipuri)
- Marathi
- Nepali
- Odia
- Punjabi
- Rajasthani
- Sanskrit
- Santali
- Sindhi
- Tamil
- Telugu
- Urdu
Sahitya Akademi Bal Sahitya Puraskar
- Assamese
- Bengali
- Bodo
- Dogri
- English
- Gujarati
- Hindi
- Kannada
- Kashmiri
- Konkani
- Maithili
- Malayalam
- Meitei (Manipuri)
- Marathi
- Nepali
- Odia
- Punjabi
- Rajasthani
- Sanskrit
- Santali
- Sindhi
- Tamil
- Telugu
- Urdu
Related
- Eighth Schedule to the Constitution of India
- Official Languages Commission
- List of languages by number of native speakers in India

Sahitya Akademi Translation Prizes are given each year to writers for their outstanding translations work in the 24 languages, including Meitei language (officially known as Manipuri language), since 1989.

== Recipients ==
Following is the list of recipients of Sahitya Akademi translation prizes for their works written in Manipuri. The award, as of 2019, consisted of ₹50,000.

Year	Translator	Title of the translation	Original Title	Original Language	Genre	Original Author	References
1989	T. Thoibi Devi	Drishtipath	Drishtipath	Bengali	Novel	Binay Mukhopadhyay	
1990	A Shyamsundar Singh	Krishnakantagee Uil	Krishna Kanter Uil	Bengali	Novel	Bankimchandra Chattopadhyay	
1991	Kalachand Shastri	Manipuri Mahabharat	Mahabharatam	Sanskrit	Epic	Vyasa	
1992	H. Guno Singh	Bangla Sahityagi Itihas	History of Bengali Literature	English	-	Sukumar Sen	
1993	L. Raghumani Sharma	Charitraheen	Charitraheen	Bengali	Novel	Sarat Chandra Chattopadhyay	
1994	E. Dinamani Singh	Hayavadana	Hayavadana	Kannada	Play	Girish Karnad	
1996	Aribam Krishna Mohan Sharma	Shivanigi Kishnuli	Collection	Hindi	Short Stories	Shivani	
1997	Ch. Nishan Ningtamba	Premchandgi Akhannbawari	Collection	Hindi	Short Stories	Premchand	
1998	I.S. Kangjam	Mahaakkee Waaree Amashung Atei Waareemachaashing	Uska Faisla Tatha Anya Kahaniyan	Hindi	Short Stories	Jawahar Singh	
1999	Aribam Radhamohan	Dashopanishad	Dashopanishad	Sanskrit	Text	Veda vyasa	
2000	Kshetri Rajeswar	Madhusala	Madhushala	Hindi	Poetry	Harivansh Rai Bachchan	
2001	Rajkumar Mani Singh	Yuganta	Yuganta	Marathi	Essays	Irawati Karve	
2002	Meghachandra Heirangkhongjam	Atoppa Dronacharya Ama	Ek Aur Dronacharya	Hindi	Play	Shanker Shesh	
2003	A. Kumar Sharma	Numitki Tarretsuba Sagol	Suraj Ka Satwan Ghoda	Hindi	Novel	Dharamvir Bharati	
2004	Nongthombam Kunjamohan Singh	Gora	Gora	Bengali	Novel	Rabindranath Tagore	
2005	I.R. Babu Singh	Lamijingba	The Guide	English	Novel	R. K. Narayan	
2006	B.S. Rajkumar Babu Singh	Netaji Subhaschandra Bose	Netaji Subhaschandra	English	Biography	Sisir Kumar Bose	
2007	A. Bhanumati Devi	Khunushinggi	A Flight of Pigeons	English	Novel	Ruskin Bond	
2008	Y. Ibomcha Singh	Sanskar	Samskara	Kannada	Novel	U. R. Ananthamurthy	
2009	S. Brajeshwor Sharma	Tamthiba Nonglei	Kaali Aandhi	Hindi	Novel	Kamleshwar	
2010	Birendra Kumar Sharma	Trainna Pakistan Tamna	Train to Pakistan	English	Novel	Khushwant Singh	
2011	S. Nandakishor Singh	Kiri Mangkhre Kari Phankhre	Kya Khoya Kya Paya	Hindi	Poetry	Atal Bihari Vajpayee	
2012	E. Sonamani Singh	Dharma Tattwa	Dharma Tattwa	Bengali	Prose	Bankim Chandra	
2013	Ibocha Soibam	Khambi Meigi Mashashing	Wings of Fire	English	Autobiography	A. P. J. Abdul Kalam	
2014	Ibotombi Mangang	Hi Irakpa	Noukadubee	Bengali	Novel	Rabindranath Tagore	
2015	Naorem Khagendra	Lishing Ama Supna Mariphumarigi Mama	Hajar Churashir Maa	Bengali	Novel	Mahasweta Devi	
2016	Anita Ningombam	E-Ba Loishinkhidraba Punshi Waari	Adha Lekha Dastavej	Assamese	Autobiography	Indira Goswami	
2017	Naorem Bidyasagar Singha	Manimahesh	Manimahesh	Bengali	Travelogue	Umaprasad Mukhopadhyay	
2018	Rajkumar Mobi Singh	Mapung Phadaba	Aadhe Adhure	Hindi	Play	Mohan Rakesh	
2019	Kh. Prakash Singh	Lalhouba Amasung Atei Sheirengshing	Bidrohi O Anyanya Kavita	Bengali	Poetry	Kazi Nazrul Islam	
2020	H. Shyamsundar Singh	Athum-Ahao Yonba Nupa	The Vendor of Sweets	English	Novel	R. K. Narayan	
2021	M.M. Ahmad	Umrao Jan Ada	Umrao Jaan Ada	Urdu	Novel	Mirza Hadi Ruswa	
2022	Salam Tomba	Angouba Kei	The White Tiger	English	Novel	Aravind Adiga	
2023	Laishram Somorendro	Mittangba Sagolgee Mingda Angamba Katpiyu	Anhe Ghore Da Daan	Punjabi	Novel	Gurdial Singh	
2024	Soibamcha Indrakumar	Yurangbi	Madhushala	Hindi	Poetry	Harivansh Rai Bachchan	

== See also ==
- List of Sahitya Akademi Award winners for Meitei
- List of Yuva Puraskar winners for Meitei
- List of epics in Meitei language
- Meitei literature
- Meitei Language Day
