= SHL M11 =

Polish motorcycle

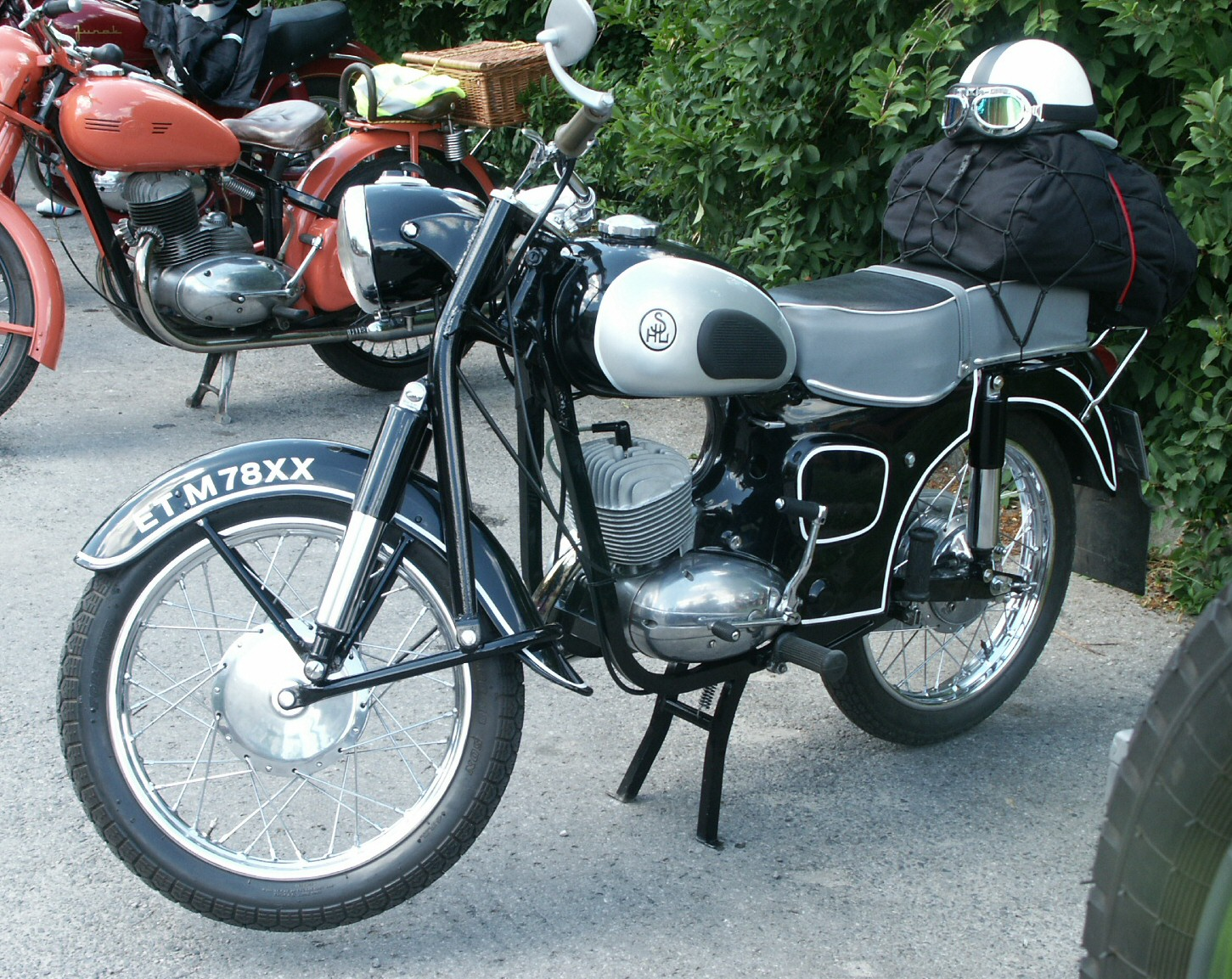
- Manufacturer: SHL
- Production: 1961-1968
- Predecessor: SHL M06
- Successor: SHL Gazela
- Engine: S-32/S-32U: 173 cm³ two-stroke, 9/10 HP (M11); W-2A Wiatr: 174 cm³ two-stroke, 12 HP (M11W)
- Bore / stroke: 61.5 mm × 58 mm (2.42 in × 2.28 in) (M11); 61 mm × 59.5 mm (2.40 in × 2.34 in) (M11W)
- Compression ratio: 6.9:1
- Top speed: 90 km/h (56 mph) (M11); 100 km/h (62 mph) (M11W)
- Power: 9 hp (6.7 kW) at 4850 rpm (M11 S32); 10 hp (7.5 kW) at 5000 rpm (M11 S32U); 12 hp (8.9 kW) at 5450 rpm (M11W)
- Tires: 3.00x19" or 3.00x18"
- Wheelbase: 1,290 mm (51 in)
- Dimensions: L: 2,010 mm (79 in); W: 660 mm (26 in); H: 960 mm (38 in)
- Seat height: 760 mm (30 in)
- Weight: 115 kg (254 lb) (dry)
- Fuel capacity: 13 litres (2.9 imp gal; 3.4 US gal)

SHL M11 was a Polish motorcycle 175 cc class, manufactured in 1961 to 1968 by SHL in Kielce.

== History ==
SHL M11 was a development of SHL M06 150 cc motorcycle. The main change was introduction of a bigger 173 cc engine S-32. The design was also strengthened, revised and improved. A visible difference was adding sheet metal side panels, covering a carburettor, battery and air filter.

The 173 cc S-32 engine was developed in Poland, basing upon S-06 150 cc engine, which in turn was developed from German DKW RT 125. A capacity was increased by increasing bore, and other changes were applied. The engine was produced by Warszawska Fabryka Motocykli (WFM) in Warsaw. Later an improved variant S-32U was introduced, with a power increased by 1 hp. From 1967 there was a new model M11W produced, with a new Polish-designed engine W-2A Wiatr, 174 cc capacity. Its power was increased by 2 hp, to 12 hp. W-2A engines were produced by Metal Works Dezamet in Nowa Dęba. In spite of its rather limited capacity, it was the second Polish motorcycle at that time, as regards to the capacity and power, after the SFM Junak, and the first Polish motorcycle 175 cc class.

Prototypes of the M11 were constructed in 1959. A production started in May 1961. From 1965 smaller 18 in wheels replaced 19 in wheels. From 1967 until July 1968, M11W model was produced, with W-2A Wiatr engine. Also a small series of rally variant M11R, with a telescopic fork was made. Nearly 180,000 were made, including 26,000 M11W.

Most motorcycles were sold in Poland, but they were also exported, among others to the USA. In 1962 a licence were sold to Escorts Group in India, where they were produced until 2005 as Rajdoot Excel-T.
