= Bachchan family =

Indian film family

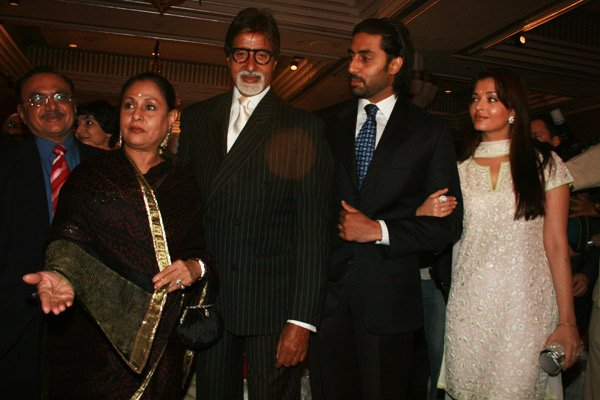
- From left to right: Jaya Bachchan, Amitabh Bachchan, Abhishek Bachchan, and Aishwarya Rai Bachchan in 2007
- Current region: Mumbai, Maharashtra, India
- Origin: Babupatti, Raniganj tehsil, Pratapgarh district, United Provinces of Agra and Oudh, British India (present-day Uttar Pradesh, India)
- Members: Harivansh Rai Bachchan; Teji Bachchan; Amitabh Bachchan; Abhishek Bachchan; Shweta Bachchan Nanda
- Connected members: Jaya Bachchan; Aishwarya Rai Bachchan; Nikhil Nanda; Kunal Kapoor
- Connected families: Kapoor family
- Traditions: Hinduism
- Estates: Jalsa Bungalow; Mumbai, Maharashtra, India

The Bachchan family is a prominent Indian show business family, associated with and involved in the Hindi film industry and Indian politics.

Notable members of the family include actor and former politician Amitabh Bachchan, his nephew, Bhuvanesh Tripathi, his wife, actress and Rajya Sabha MP Jaya Bachchan; his parents, poet Harivansh Rai Bachchan and social activist Teji Bachchan; their daughter, author Shweta Bachchan Nanda; their son, actor Abhishek Bachchan; and Abhishek's wife, actress Aishwarya Rai. In 2007, Time listed Amitabh Bachchan, Abhishek Bachchan and Aishwarya Rai on its list of most influential Indians.

== Overview ==
The Bachchan family are Indian Awadhi Hindu Chitraguptavanshi Kayasthas fluent in several Hindustani languages (Awadhi, Hindi, Urdu) as well as Persian. The family also has Punjabi ethnic roots through patriarch Amitabh's mother Teji Bachchan (née Suri), who comes from a Sikh family from Lyallpur (in present-day Pakistan), and Bengali ethnic roots through Amitabh's wife, Jaya (née Bhaduri). The Bachchan family also is connected to the Mangalore region of South India through Amitabh's daughter-in-law Aishwarya Rai Bachchan who hails from the Tulu Bunt community.

The family has two houses, Jalsa and Pratiksha, in Mumbai and resides in Jalsa.

== Members of the Bachchan family ==
=== First generation ===
- Harivansh Rai Bachchan - Hindi poet, father of Amitabh and Ajitabh.
- Shyama Bachchan - A social activist, first wife of Harivansh Rai Bachchan.
- Teji Bachchan - Second wife of Harivansh Rai Bachchan, mother of Amitabh and Ajitabh.

=== Second generation ===
- Amitabh Bachchan - Indian actor, Harivansh and Teji's elder son.
- Jaya Bachchan - Indian actress, wife of Amitabh. Daughter of Tarun Kumar Bhaduri and Indira Bhaduri.
- Ajitabh Bachchan - Indian businessman, Harivansh and Teji's younger son.
- Ramola Bachchan - An entrepreneur, wife of Ajitabh.

=== Third generation ===
- Shweta Bachchan Nanda - A columnist and author, Amitabh and Jaya's daughter, wife of Nikhil Nanda, a businessman, and grandson of Raj Kapoor.
- Abhishek Bachchan - Indian actor, Amitabh and Jaya's son, married to Aishwarya Rai Bachchan.
- Aishwarya Rai Bachchan - Indian actress, wife of Abhishek Bachchan.
- Nilima Bachchan - An aeronautical engineer, Ajitabh and Ramola's daughter.
- Namrita Bachchan - A painter and graphic designer, Ajitabh and Ramola's daughter
- Naina Bachchan - An investment banker, Ajitabh and Ramola's daughter, wife of Kunal Kapoor, an Indian film actor.
- Bhim Bachchan - An investment banker, Ajitabh and Ramola's son

=== Fourth generation ===
- Navya Naveli Nanda - An entrepreneur, Nikhil and Shweta's daughter
- Agastya Nanda - Indian actor, Nikhil and Shweta's son
- Aaradhya Bachchan - Abhishek and Aishwarya's daughter

== Gallery ==
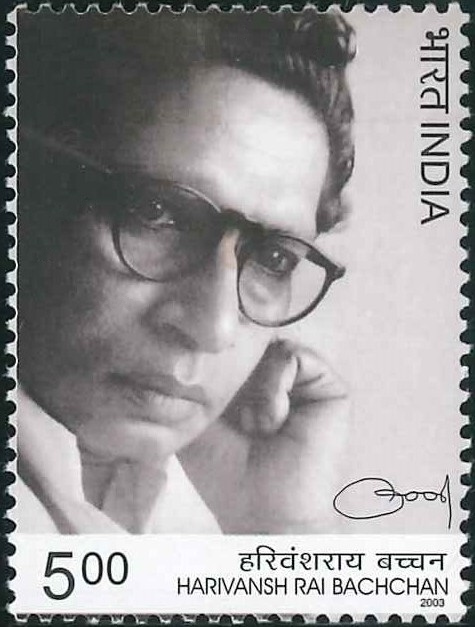
Harivansh Rai Bachchan

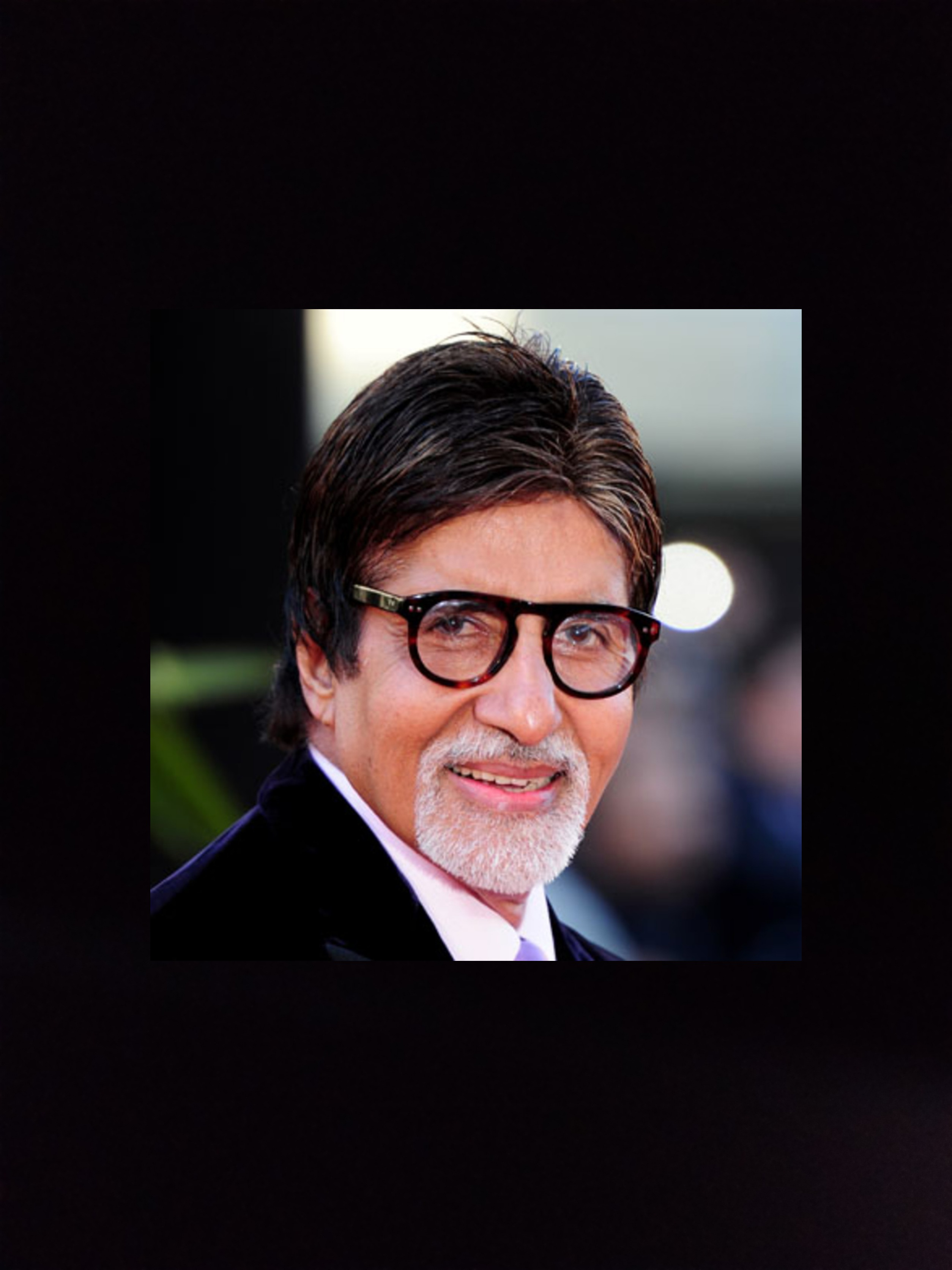
Amitabh Bachchan

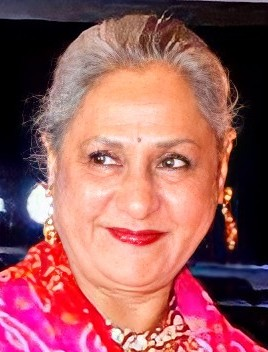
Jaya Bachchan

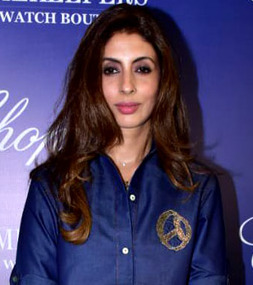
Shweta Bachchan Nanda

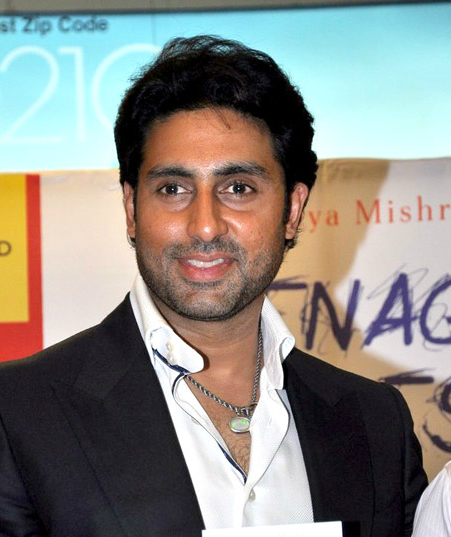
Abhishek Bachchan

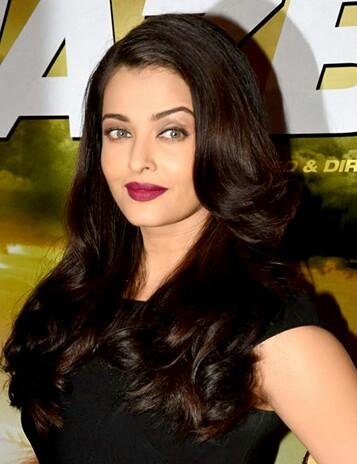
Aishwarya Rai Bachchan

== See also ==
- List of Hindi film families
