= Agastya Nanda =

Indian actor (born 2000)

- Born: 23 November 2000 (age 25); Mumbai, Maharashtra, India
- Occupation: Actor
- Years active: 2023–present
- Parents: Nikhil Nanda (father); Shweta Bachchan (mother)
- Relatives: Kapoor family Bachchan family

Agastya Nanda (born 2000) is an Indian actor who works in Hindi films. Born to businessman Nikhil Nanda and columnist-author Shweta Bachchan Nanda, he has played Archie Andrews in The Archies (2023), which marked his screen debut.

== Early life and background ==
Nanda was born in Mumbai in 2000. His father is businessman Nikhil Nanda, son of Rajan Nanda (son of Har Prasad Nanda) and Ritu Nanda (née Kapoor, elder daughter of actor Raj Kapoor), and his mother is columnist and author Shweta Bachchan Nanda, daughter of actors Amitabh and Jaya Bachchan. He has an elder sister, entrepreneur Navya Naveli Nanda.

From his mother's side he belongs to the Bachchan family and is the nephew of actors Abhishek Bachchan and Aishwarya Rai Bachchan. He is related to the Kapoor family through his father and paternal grandmother. Businesswoman Nitasha Nanda is his aunt, and the actors Ranbir Kapoor, Karisma Kapoor and Kareena Kapoor are his father's first cousins.

He studied at the Sevenoaks School in the United Kingdom.

== Career ==
Nanda did not go to acting school and made his film debut with The Archies, portraying Archie Andrews, a guitarist and singer. The film was released on Netflix in December 2023. Shilajit Mitra of The Hindu noted, "Agastya, a decent lead, delivers his lines in a hushed, far-off way. It’s as if Archie is always non-committal about what he says or feels." Udita Jhunjhunwala of Scroll.in stated, "Agastya Nanda is likeable though a touch diffident in his timbre. Unlike some of his peers, he appears to have made an effort to play a singer." Nanda felt his first film did not work.

He was next be seen in Sriram Raghavan's war film Ikkis, in which he plays army officer Arun Khetarpal. Anuj Kumar of The Hindu wrote, "In a breakout role, Agastya conveys the resolve, innocence, and restlessness of a young soldier through his deep, vulnerable eyes. Sometimes, in a single frame. The boy’s anguish is very Bachchanesque and demands attention". Other reviewers felt that he slipped into the character well.

Apart from films, he has been a partner with the restaurant Project Hum in Mumbai for four years.

== Filmography ==
=== Films ===
Year	Title	Role	Notes	Ref.
2023	The Archies	Archie Andrews		
2025	Ikkis	Arun Khetarpal		
