= Yamaha RX-King 135 =

Yamaha RX-King 135 / RX-K 135
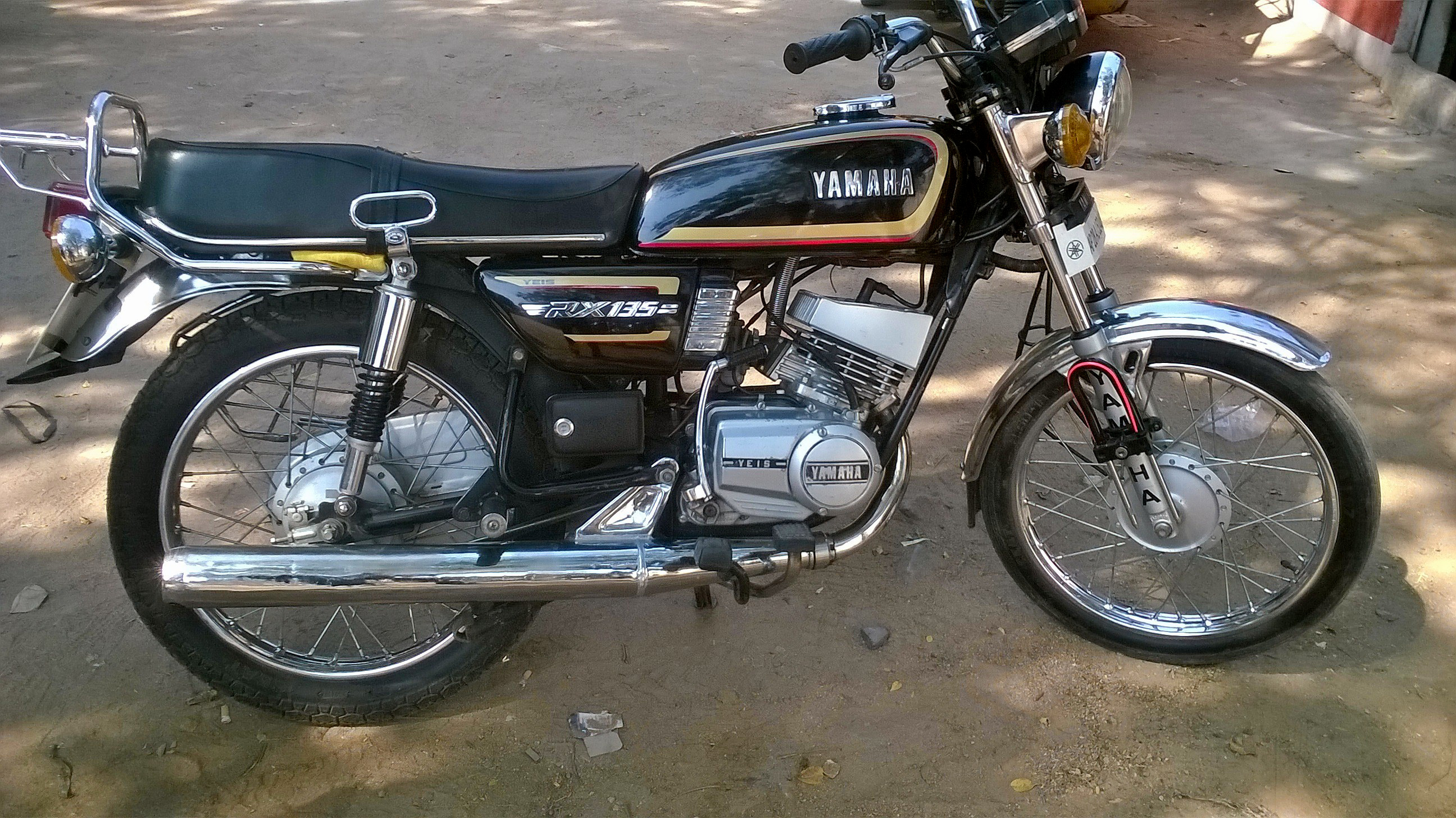
- Manufacturer: Yamaha Motor Company
- Also called: RXT 135 (Philippines); RX-Concorde (Thailand); RX-135 (India)
- Parent company: Yamaha Corporation
- Production: 1980–2009
- Class: Standard/sport bike
- Engine: 132 cc (8.06 cu in) air-cooled 2-stroke Reed-valve single-cylinder)
- Bore / stroke: 58.0 mm × 50.0 mm (2.3 in × 2.0 in)
- Transmission: 5-speed constant mesh
- Frame type: Double Cradle
- Suspension: Front: Conventional telescopic fork Rear: swingarm with twin shock
- Brakes: Front: Dual-piston caliper Rear: Drum brake
- Tires: Front: 2.75-18-4 PR; Rear: 3.00-18-4 PR
- Wheelbase: 1,245 mm (49.0 in)
- Dimensions: L: 1,970 mm (78 in); W: 735 mm (28.9 in); H: 1,065 mm (41.9 in)
- Seat height: 770 mm (30 in)
- Fuel capacity: 9.5 L (2.1 imp gal; 2.5 US gal)
- Oil capacity: 1 L (0.22 imp gal; 0.26 US gal)
- Related: Yamaha RX-Z; Yamaha RX-S/RX-Special 115; Yamaha RX-R 115; Yamaha RX-100/125; Yamaha YT-115

The Yamaha RX-K 135 is a two-stroke engine motorcycle manufactured by the Yamaha Motor Company in Southeast Asia. It was also known as RX-King in Indonesia, RX-K in Malaysia and Singapore, RXT 135 in the Philippines, and as RX-135 in India.

== Model history ==
Before the RX-K, there was the RX 125 (1976) and the RX 100. The RX line was originally developed for the Indian market, where it was manufactured by Rajdoot and Yamaha. the RX name signifies "Rajdoot X". The original RX-K 135 was released in 1980, and was fitted with a bikini fairing and imported to Indonesia fully built-up. This model has a maximum power output of 17.5 PS (12.9 kW) at 8,750 rpm and 14.8 N⋅m (10.9 lb⋅ft) of torque at 8,000 rpm, and weighs 99 kg (218 lb). There was also the similar RX-S (later RX-Special), fitted with a 115 cc engine and also imported CBU. In 1983, the RX-K was updated to become the locally built RX-King.

== Overview ==
In Indonesia the RX-King 135 was produced by Yamaha Indonesia Motor Manufacturing beginning in 1983. The first RX-King had a new reshaped petrol tank and updated seat; because of the raised handle bars this was nicknamed "Cobra" in Indonesia. The first generation was particularly desirable as it was fitted with an imported, Japanese-made engine (engine codes Y1 and Y2) producing 18.2 PS (13.4 kW) and 15.1 N⋅m (11.1 lb⋅ft) of torque at 8,000 rpm. The engine had a Yamaha Energy Induction System (YEIS), developed after customer surveys suggested that Indonesian buyers preferred good fuel economy.

A locally manufactured engine replaced the imported version after 1991, with the new model being nicknamed the RX-King "Master". Maximum power crept up to 18.5 PS (13.6 kW) at 9,000 rpm. The Master was remoelled in 1997.

In 2002 a new version, the "New RX-King", was produced with a round headlight replacing the old square unit. The rear light was also changed, and the instrumentation was redesigned, and it was compliant with the stricter emissions requirements if the time. From 2006 the RX-King in Indonesia used a catalytic converter, which allowed it to pass Euro 2 regulations.

The motorcycle has had a negative association with snatchers (jambret) and pickpockets as they showed a preference for using the RX-King as a getaway motorcycle. Songs have also been written about it, such as "RX-King Senggol Dong" Boss By Jigo and "Numpak RX-King" by Sodiq Monata. There were four generations of the motorcycle, sold in Indonesia from 1980 to 2009.
