= SHL (motorcycle) =

SHL is a brand of Polish motorcycles, produced from 1938 until 1970, first by Huta Ludwików in Kielce, then WFM in Warsaw, and finally by KZWM Polmo-SHL in Kielce.

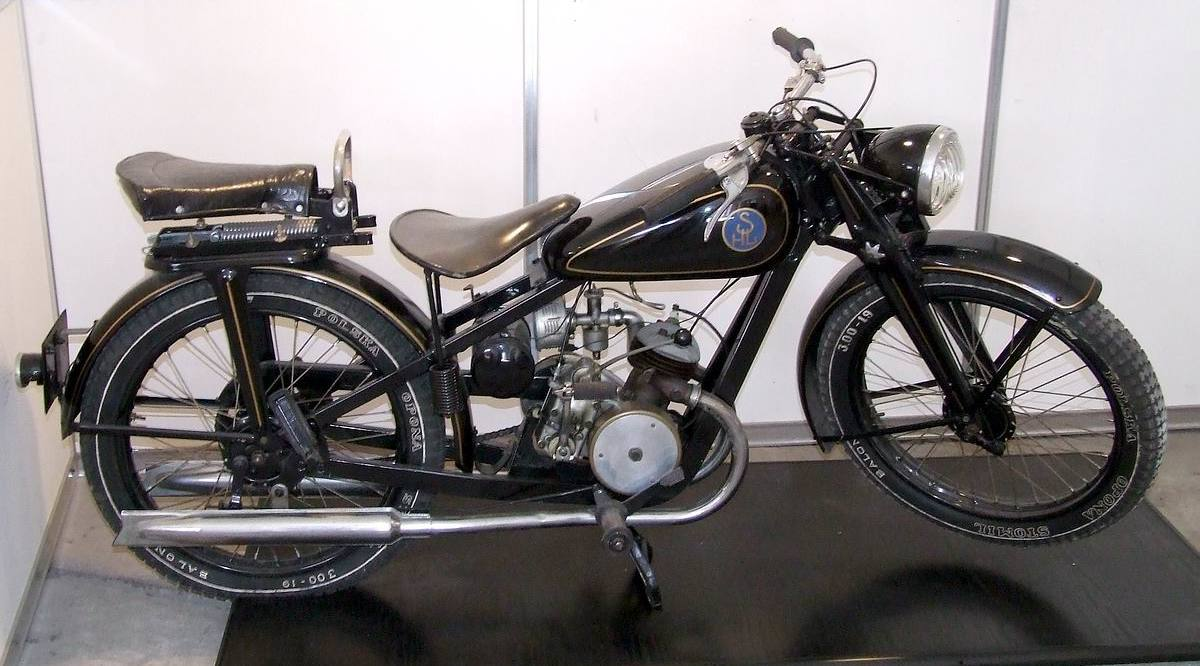
SHL 98 in Muzeum Techniki in Warsaw

== Pre-war ==
The Huta Ludwików (Ludwików Ironworks), founded in 1919 in Kielce, at first produced hardware and agricultural machines. From 1938 it started production of a light motorcycle of its own design, using imported 98 cm³ British Villiers engines, with parts of engines locally manufactured. The motorcycle was named SHL 98 – SHL being short for Suchedniowska Huta Ludwików (Suchedniów Ludwików Ironworks, as the works were initially owned by a foundry in Suchedniów). Fewer than 1,000 motorcycles were manufactured before the outbreak of World War II in 1939 and the German occupation of Poland.

== Postwar beginnings ==
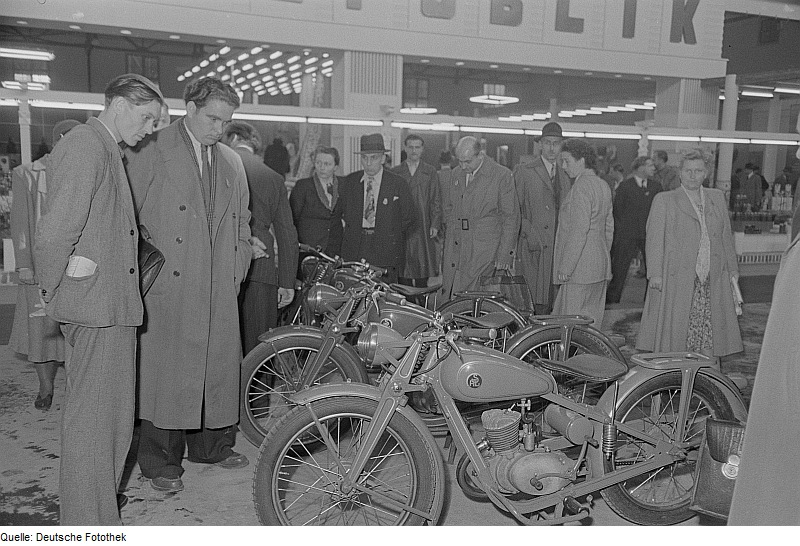
SHL M04 motorcycles at the Autumn 1952 Leipzig Trade Fair

After the war the looted works were nationalized and it was decided that motorcycle production would continue. The first postwar model SHL 125 – M02 of 1947 was a mix of pre-war SHL parts and frames and the German DKW RT 125 design, using a copy of the RT 125 engine, produced by PZL Psie Pole in Wrocław. A small series of 203 motorcycles was manufactured in State Automobile Workshops Nr.2 in Warsaw (later WFM – Warsaw Motorcycle Factory) and was similar to Sokół 125 of the same factory.

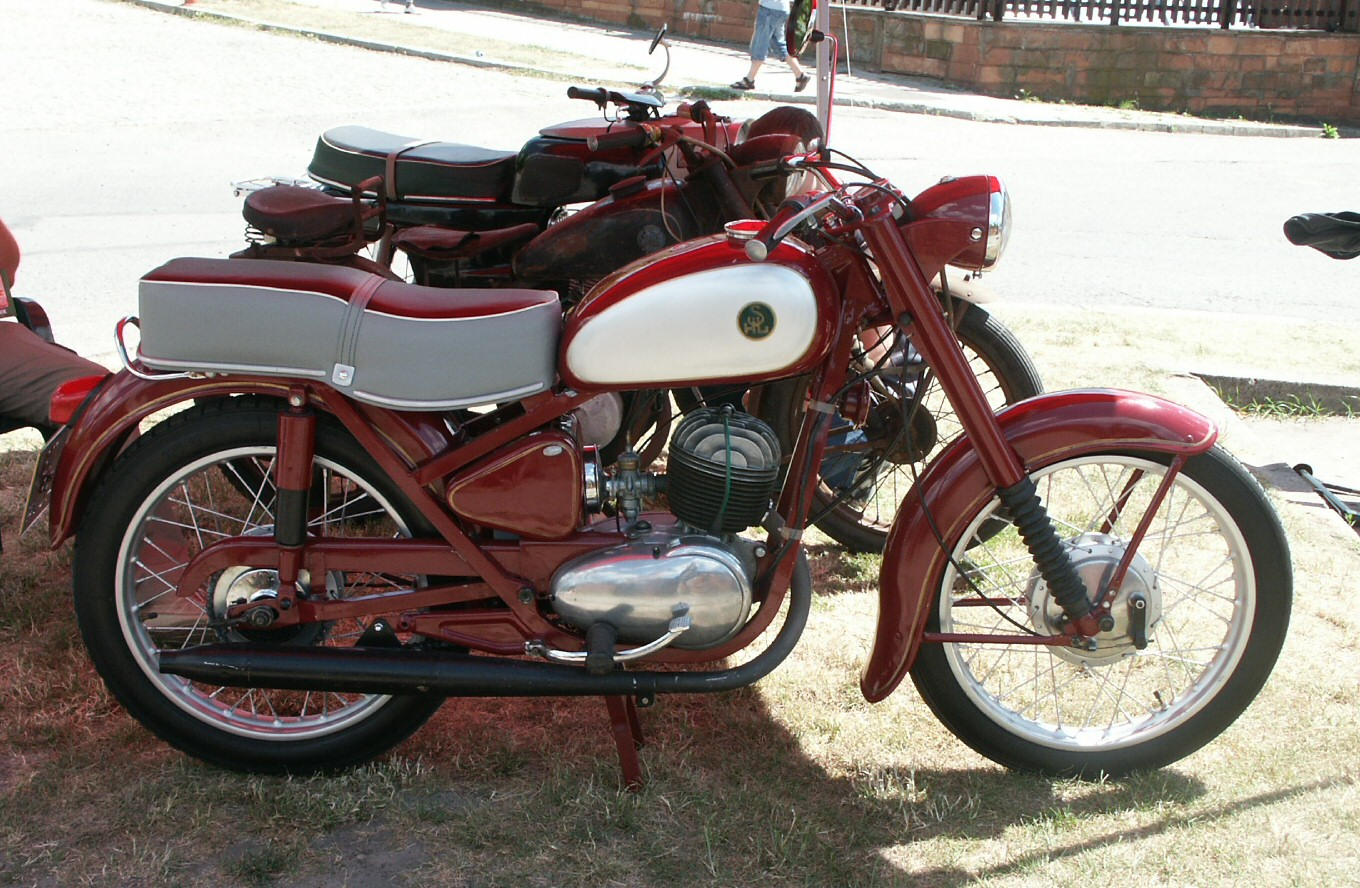
SHL M06U

The first model to be produced in Kielce again was improved SHL M03 of 1948, and then SHL M04 of 1949. In 1948 the name of Huta Ludwików was changed to KZWM Polmo-SHL (Kieleckie Zakłady Wyrobów Metalowych – Kielce Metal Works). The communist authorities decided to keep pre-war SHL brand, which was not a rule. Some 18,500 motorcycles had been made in Kielce so far. In 1951, however, it was decided that motorcycle production in Kielce would cease, and the production of SHL M04 was moved to WFM in Warsaw, where it was continued until 1954. It was followed then by a short series of SHL M05 in 1955, with telescopic front suspension. All these motorcycles were improvements of one design, related to the DKW RT 125, with 125 cc engines. Then, the SHL brand disappeared for a short time, replaced by the WFM brand.

== Production summit ==
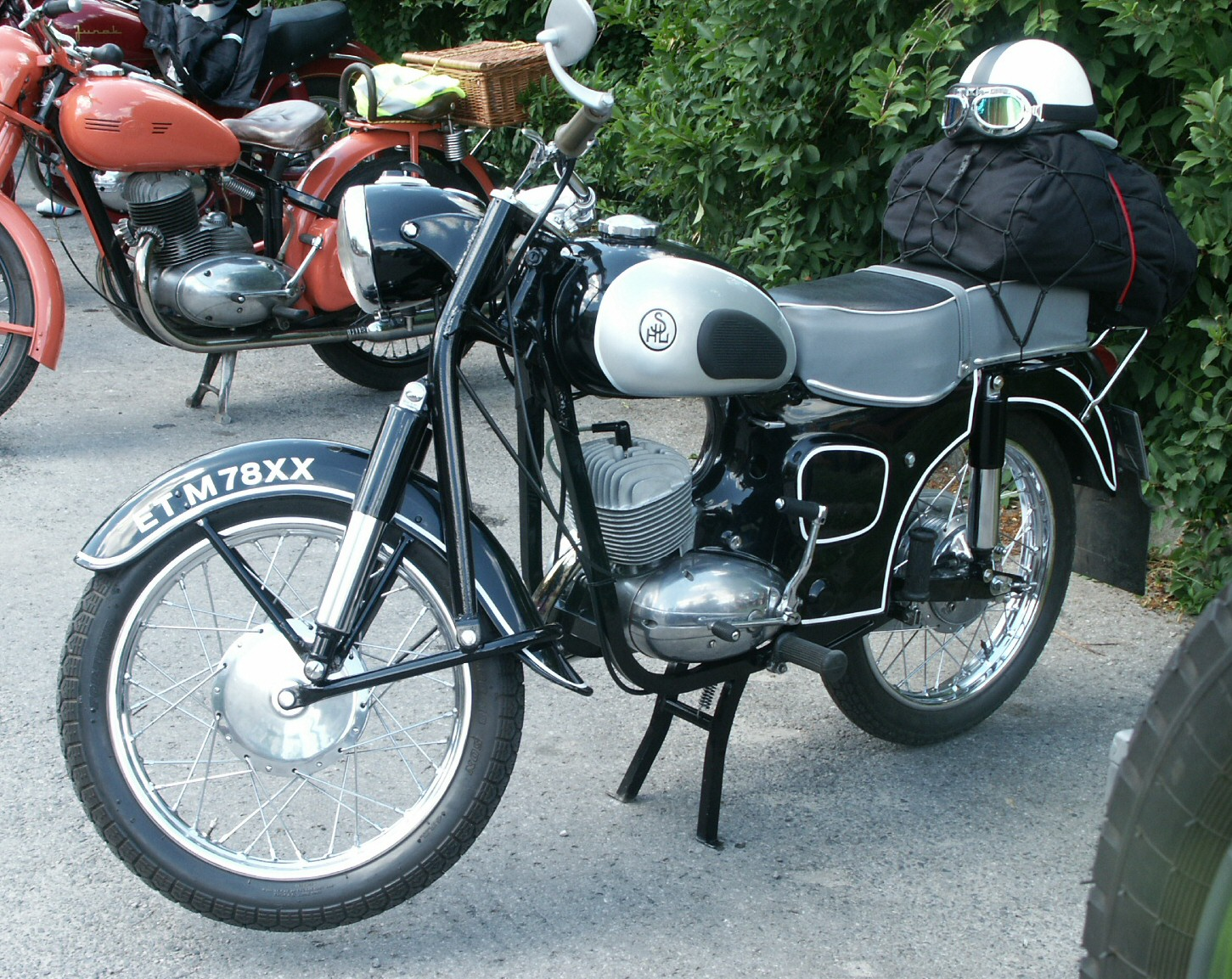
SHL M11

After the end of Stalinist period in Poland, from 1958, the KZWM Polmo-SHL in Kielce returned to motorcycle production. The new model was SHL M06U, which was an improved version of the WFM M06, more luxurious and fitted with 150 cc engine. By 1959, 10,356 were made, followed by 27,370 of M06T, with an improved front suspension.

The most popular SHL model became the SHL M11 – some 180,000 were made from 1961–1968. It was a new model, although being a development of the M06T, powered by a 175 cc engine. In spite of its rather limited capacity, it was second among Polish motorcycles of that time in terms of power and capacity, after the SFM Junak. Some M11s were exported, even to the US, and in 1962 the Escorts group bought a licence to manufacture this model in India, under a brand Rajdoot. It became a staple of Indian rural milkmen and its licence production lasted until 2005.

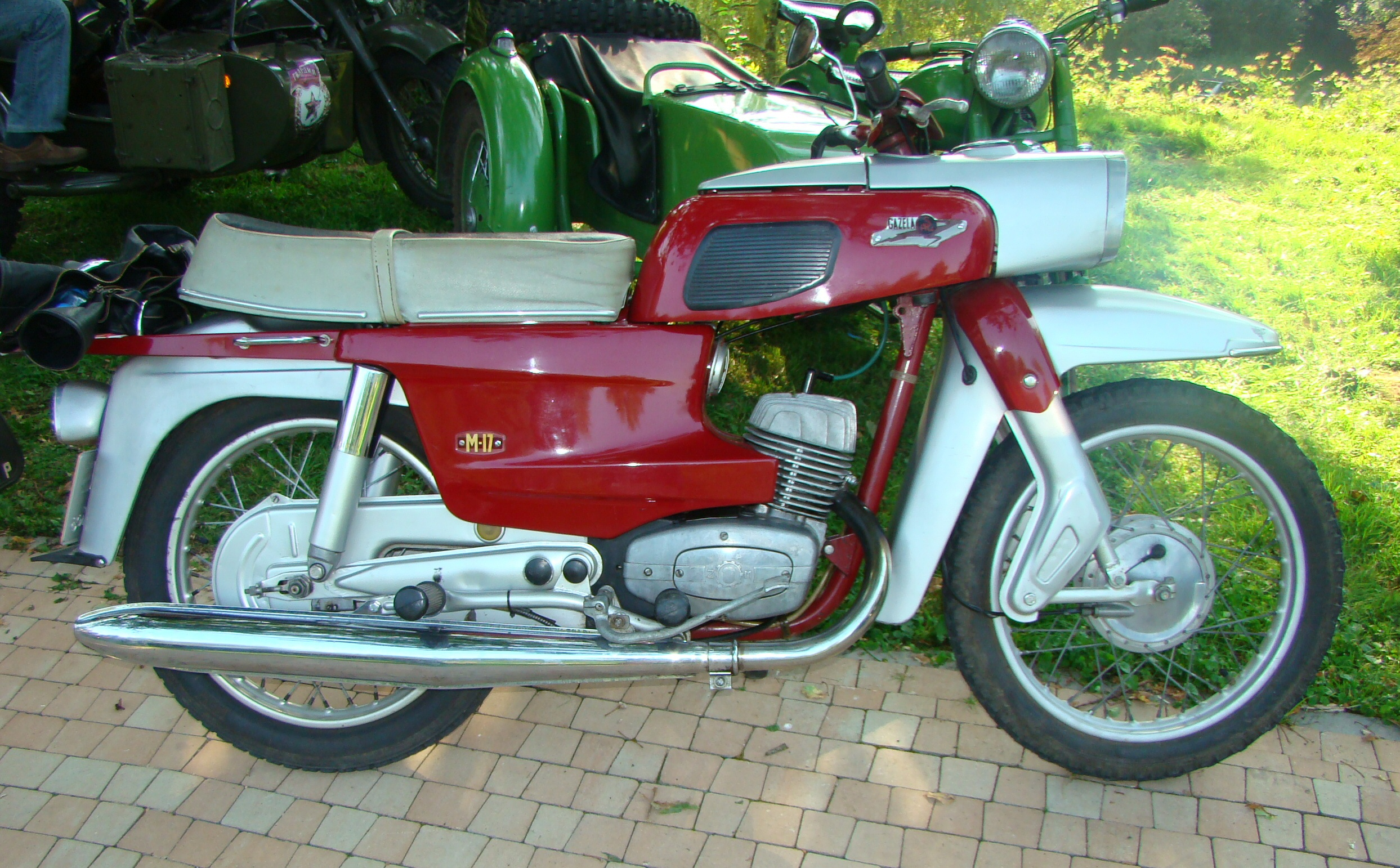
SHL M17 Gazela

The M11 was followed by an SHL M17 Gazela (gazelle), with stronger 175 cc engine and styled fairings. Some 50,000 were made from 1968–1970. It was the last model with the SHL badge, since the centrally planned economy's authorities decided, this time ultimately, to stop motorcycle production in Kielce and leave the WSK PZL-Świdnik as the only Polish motorcycle manufacturer.

== Bibliography ==
Notes

References

- Henshaw, Peter (2008). The BSA Bantam Bible: All Models 1948 to 1971 (2008 ed.). Veloce Publishing Ltd. ISBN 978-1-84584-159-1. - Total pages: 160
- Zakrzewski, Adam (2010). Auto-moto PRL: władcy dróg i poboczy [Auto-moto Polish People's Republic: kings of streets and roadsides] (in Polish). Warsaw: Demart. ISBN 978-83-7427-484-5.
