= Harivansh Rai Bachchan =

Hindi poet and writer (1907–2003)

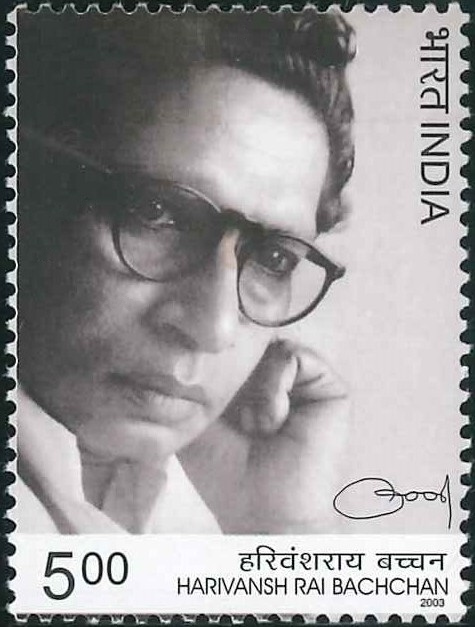
- Bachchan on a 2003 stamp of India
- Born: Harivansh Rai Srivastava; 27 November 1907; Babupatti, United Provinces of Agra and Oudh, British India
- Died: 18 January 2003 (aged 95); Mumbai, Maharashtra, India
- Education: Allahabad University (B.A); St Catharine's College, Cambridge (PhD)
- Occupations: Poet; writer
- Spouse: Shyama Bachchan (m. 1926; died 1936) Teji Bachchan (m. 1941)
- Children: 2 (including Amitabh Bachchan)
- Relatives: Bachchan family
- Writing career
- Pen name: Bachchan
- Language: Awadhi and Hindi
- Notable awards: Padma Bhushan (1976)

Member of Parliament, Rajya Sabha
- In office 3 April 1966 – 2 April 1972
- Constituency: Nominated
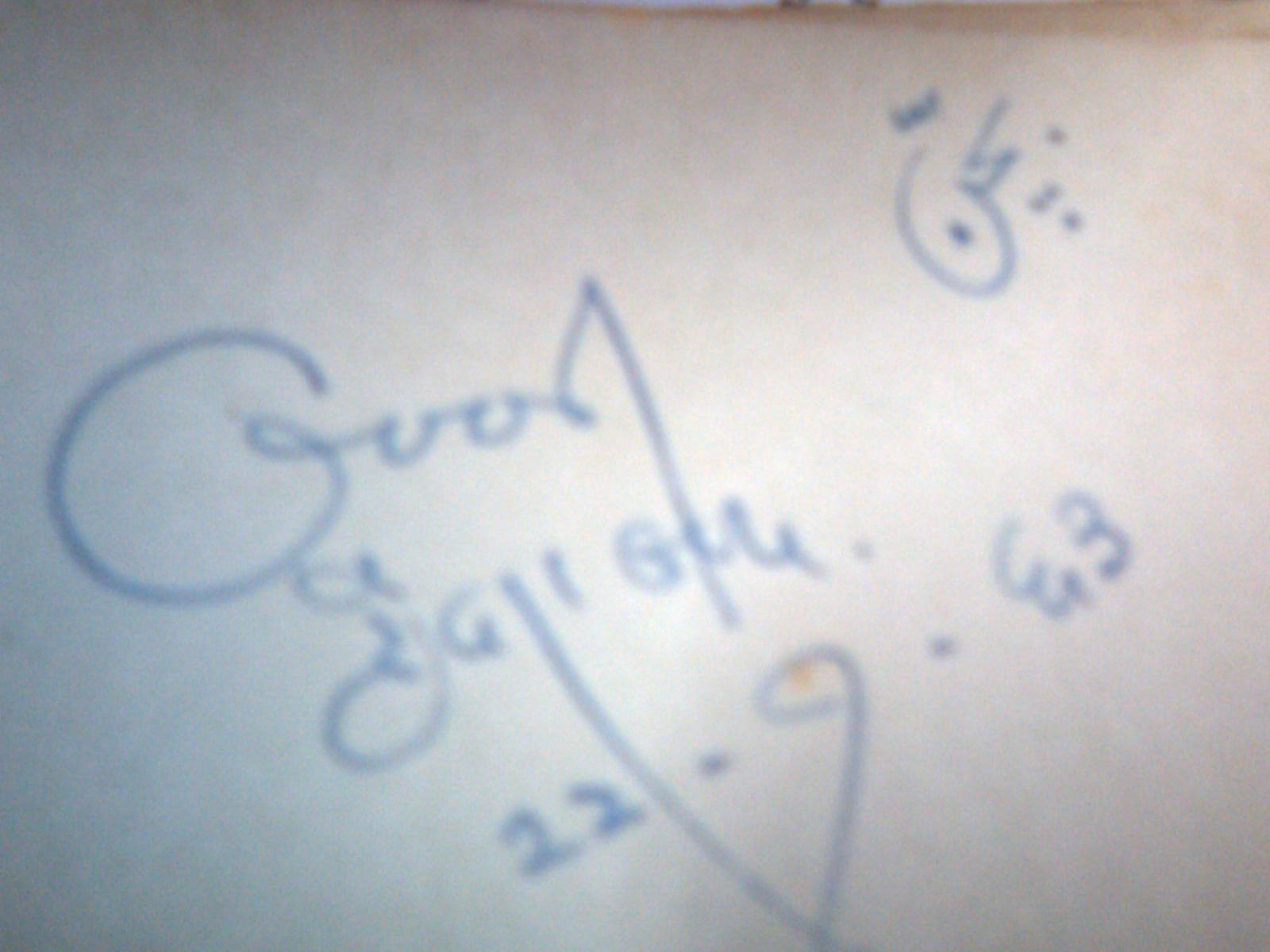
- Signature

Harivansh Rai Bachchan (né Srivastava; 27 November 1907 – 18 January 2003) was an Indian poet and writer of the Nayi Kavita literary movement of early 20th century Hindi literature. He was also a poet of the Hindi Kavi Sammelan. Bachchan is best known for his early work Madhushala. He was the father of Amitabh Bachchan, and grandfather of Shweta Bachchan Nanda and Abhishek Bachchan. His wife Teji Bachchan was a social activist. In 1976, he received the Padma Bhushan for his service to Hindi literature.

== Early life ==
Bachchan was born in Babupatti, United Provinces of Agra and Oudh in British India on 27 November 1907 into a Hindu Kayastha family. His family name was Srivastava. He began using the pen name "Bachchan" (meaning child) for his Hindi poetry. From 1941 to 1957, he taught in the English Department at the Allahabad University and then spent the next two years at St Catharine's College, Cambridge, completing a PhD regarding W. B. Yeats.

== Personal life ==
Bachchan married Shyama in 1926 who died of tuberculosis in 1936. In 1941, he married Teji Suri. Their elder son Amitabh Bachchan was born on 11 October 1942, followed by their younger son, Ajitabh, on 18 May 1947.

He had used the pen name Bachchan ("child-like" in colloquial Hindi), under which he published all of his works. When looking to get their elder son admitted to a school, he and Teji decided the family's surname should be Bachchan instead of Srivastava, as both parents opposed the caste system. Thus, it became the legal surname of the family. He was close friends with the Hindi cinema thespian Prithviraj Kapoor.

Bachchan died on 18 January 2003 due to respiratory failure.

== Writing career ==
Bachchan was fluent in several Hindi languages (Hindustani and Awadhi). He incorporated a broadly Hindustani vocabulary, written in Devanagari script. While he could not read Persian script, he was influenced by Persian and Urdu poetry, particularly Omar Khayyam.

== Works used in movies ==
Bachchan's work has been used in movies and music. Couplets from "Agneepath" are used throughout the 1990 film Agneepath, featuring his son Amitabh, and also later in the 2012 remake Agneepath, starring Hrithik Roshan, as well as in the TV serial Ishqbaaz. "Agneepath" was also included as a chapter in the NCERT Hindi class 9th textbook, Sparsh.

Miṭṭī kā tan, mastī kā man, kṣan bhar jīvan, merā paricay.
(मिट्टी का तन, मस्ती का मन, क्षण भर जीवन, मेरा परिचय)
(Body of clay, mind of fun, life of a moment, my introduction)

=== List of works ===
Poems

- Chal Mardane
- Barsaat Ki Aati Hawa
- Tera Haar (तेरा हार) (1932)
- Madhushala (मधुशाला) (1935)
- Madhubala (मधुबाला) (1936)
- Madhukalash (मधुकलश) (1937)
- Raat Aadhi Kheench Kar Meri Hatheli
- Nisha Nimantran (निशा निमंत्रण) (1938)
- Ekaant Sangeet (एकांत संगीत) (1939)
- Aakul Antar (आकुल अंतर) (1943)
- Satarangini (सतरंगिनी) (1945)
- Halaahal (हलाहल) (1946)
- Bengal ka Kaavya (बंगाल का काव्य) (1946)
- Khaadi ke Phool (खादी के फूल) (1948)
- Soot ki Maala (सूत की माला) (1948)
- Milan Yamini (मिलन यामिनी) (1950)
- Pranay Patrika (प्रणय पत्रिका) (1955)
- Dhaar ke idhar udhar (धार के इधर उधर) (1957)
- Aarti aur Angaare (आरती और अंगारे) (1958)
- Buddha aur Naachghar (बुद्ध और नाचघर) (1958)
- Tribhangima (त्रिभंगिमा) (1961)
- Chaar kheme Chaunsath khoonte (चार खेमे चौंसठ खूंटे) (1962)
- Do Chattane (दो चट्टानें) (1965)
- Bahut din beete (बहुत दिन बीते) (1967)
- Kat-ti pratimaaon ki awaaz (कटती प्रतिमाओं की आवाज़) (1968)
- Ubharte pratimaano ke roop (उभरते प्रतिमानों के रूप) (1969)
- Jaal sameta (जाल समेटा) (1973)
- Nirman (निर्माण)
- Aathmaparichai (आत्मपरिचय)
- Ek Geet (एक गीत)
- Bhool gaya hai kyun insaan (भूल गया है क्यों इंसान)
- Agneepath (अग्निपथ)

Miscellaneous

- Bachpan ke saath kshan bhar (बचपन के साथ क्षण भर) (1934)
- Khaiyyam ki madhushala (खय्याम की मधुशाला) (1938)
- Sopaan (सोपान) (1953)
- Macbeth (मेकबेथ)(1957)
- Jangeet (जनगीता) (1958)
- Omar Khaiyyam ki rubaaiyan (उमर खय्याम की रुबाइयाँ) (1959)
- Kaviyon ke saumya sant: Pant (कवियों के सौम्य संत: पंत) (1960)
- Aaj ke lokpriya Hindi kavi: Sumitranandan Pant (आज के लोकप्रिय हिन्दी कवि: सुमित्रानंदन पंत) (1960)
- Aadhunik kavi: 7 (आधुनिक कवि: ७) (1961)
- Nehru: Raajnaitik jeevanchitra (नेहरू: राजनैतिक जीवनचित्र) (1961)
- Naye puraane jharokhe (नये पुराने झरोखे) (1962)
- Abhinav sopaan (अभिनव सोपान) (1964)
- Chausath roosi kavitaayein (चौसठ रूसी कवितायें) (1964)
- W. B. Yeats and Occultism (1968)
- Markat dweep ka swar (मरकट द्वीप का स्वर) (1968)
- Naagar geet (नागर गीत) (1966)
- Bachpan ke lokpriya geet (बचपन के लोकप्रिय गीत) (1967)
- Hamlet (1969)
- Bhaasha apni bhaav paraaye (भाषा अपनी भाव पराये) (1970)
- Pant ke sau patra (पंत के सौ पत्र) (1970)
- Pravaas ki diary (प्रवास की डायरी) (1971)
- King Lear (1972)
- Tooti Chooti kadiyan (टूटी छूटी कड़ियां) (1973)
- Meri kavitaayi ki aadhi sadi (मेरी कविताई की आधी सदी) (1981)
- So-ham hans (सोहं हंस) (1981)
- Aathve dashak ki pratinidhi shreshth kavitaayein (आठवें दशक की प्रतिनिधी श्रेष्ठ कवितायें) (1982)
- Meri shreshth kavitaayein (मेरी श्रेष्ठ कवितायें) (1984)
- Jo beet gai so Bat gai

Autobiography

- Kya bhooloon kya yaad karoon (क्या भूलूं क्या याद करूं) (1969)
- Neerh ka nirmaan phir (नीड़ का निर्माण फिर) (1970)
- Basere se door (बसेरे से दूर) (1977)
- Dashdwaar se sopaan tak (दशद्वार से सोपान तक) (1985), In the Afternoon of Time
- Bachchan rachanavali ke nau khand (बच्चन रचनावली के नौ खण्ड)

== See also ==
- Indian Writers
- Indian Poets
