= Suzuki AX100 =

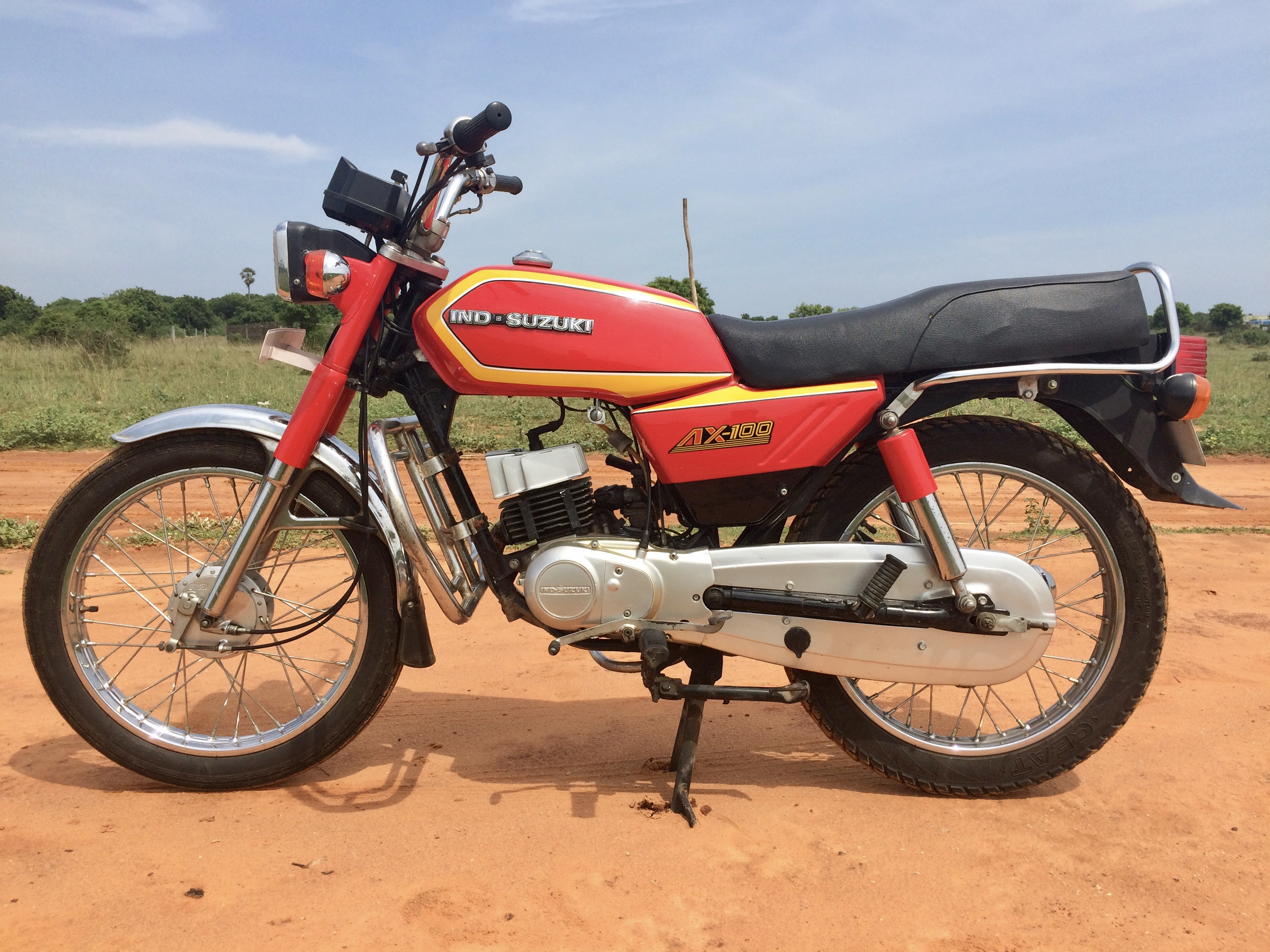
- Production: 1984-
- Class: Commuter
- Engine: Single Cylinder, 2 stroke, Aircooled, case reed induction
- Bore / stroke: 50 mm × 50 mm (2.0 in × 2.0 in)
- Compression ratio: 6.6:1
- Top speed: 85 km/h (Manufacturer claimed)
- Ignition type: capacitor discharge ignition
- Transmission: 4 speed constant mesh
- Suspension: Front: Telescopic Oil Damped Rear: Swinging arm, hydraulic shock absorber with coaxial spring
- Brakes: Front: Internal Expanding (110 Dia) Rear: Internal expanding (110 Dia)
- Tires: Front 2.75. 18" - 4PR Rear 3.00. 18" - 6PR
- Wheelbase: 1,217 mm (47.9 in)
- Dimensions: L: 2,057 mm (81.0 in); W: 725 mm (28.5 in); H: 1,053 mm (41.5 in)
- Fuel capacity: 12 L (2.6 imp gal; 3.2 US gal)
- Oil capacity: 1.3 L (0.29 imp gal; 0.34 US gal) (including reserve)
- Turning radius: 1,800 mm (71 in)

Suzuki AX 100 is a two-stroke, 98 cc motorcycle produced by Suzuki in Japan, India and China.

As of 2026, it is still manufactured for Suzuki by Jiangmen Dachangjiang in China, and sold in a few select countries such as Argentina and Dominican Republic. There are also copies sold by Jincheng and various other brands.

== History in India ==
This was the first-ever 100cc motorcycle launched in India. The first batch vehicles came as Completely Knocked Down kits due to this reason the production cost was a bit higher. It was successful during the launch period but failed to repeat the success it had in the later years. This was mainly because Yamaha has taken the Indian commuter market with the launch of Yamaha RX 100, and due to the increased production cost.

Jincheng AX100 - Kano

2023 Suzuki AX100 with aftermarket aluminium rims
