= Yamaha RX 100 =

Yamaha RX100
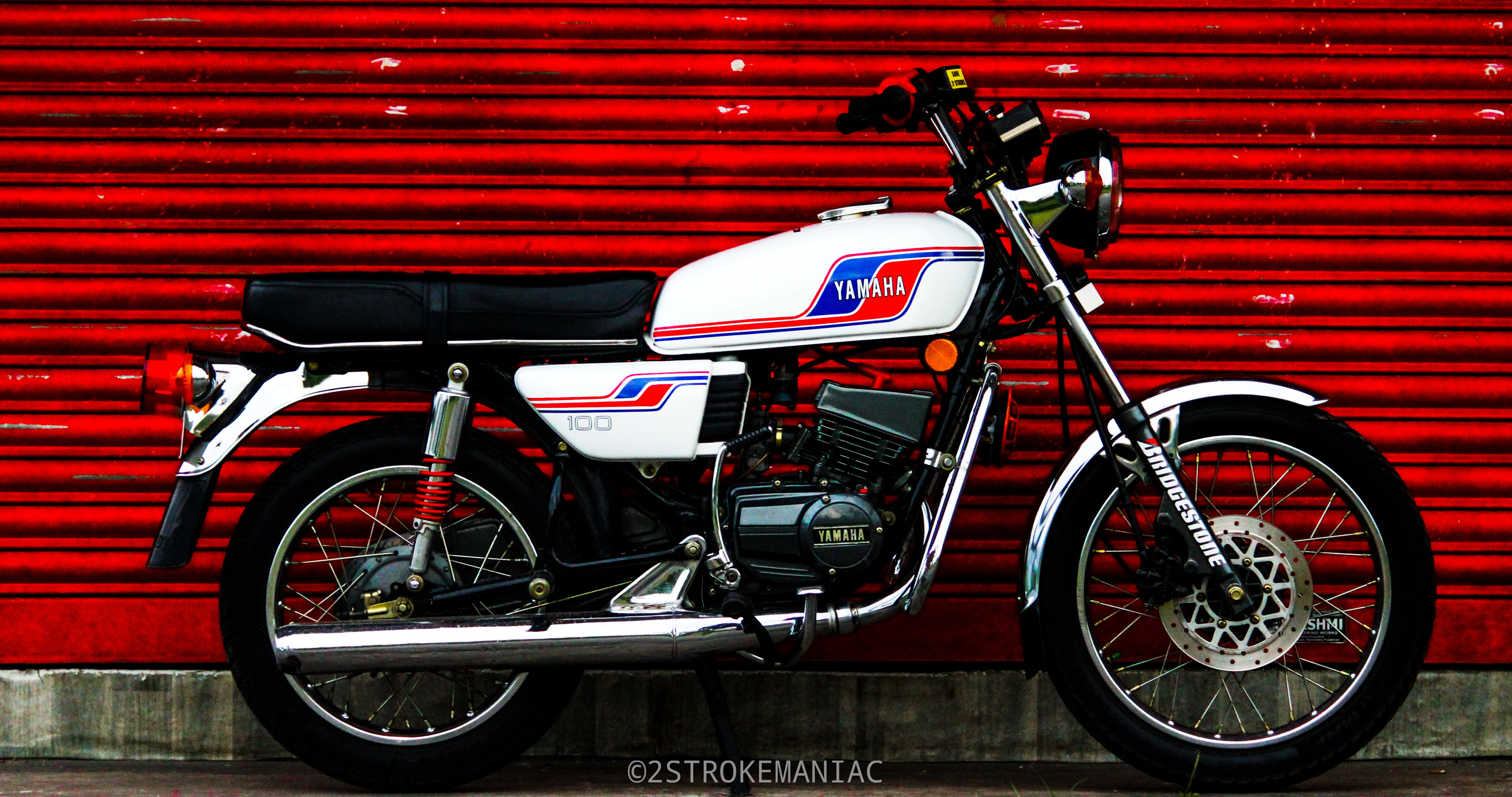
- Manufacturer: Yamaha Motor Company
- Parent company: Escorts Limited
- Production: 1981–1996
- Successor: Yamaha RXG, Yamaha RX-Z, Yamaha RX135
- Class: Commuter Sports
- Engine: 98.2 cc (5.99 cu in) air-cooled, reed valve two-stroke single
- Top speed: 110 kmph
- Power: 11.2 hp
- Torque: 10.45Nm @7500rpm
- Transmission: Four-speed constant mesh, multiplate clutch
- Suspension: KYB telescopic fork, swing arm
- Brakes: Expanding Drum (both front and rear)
- Tires: Wire spoked, F: 2.50×18, R: 2.75×18
- Wheelbase: 1,240 mm (49 in)
- Dimensions: L: 2,040 mm (80 in); W: 740 mm (29 in); H: J1,060 mm (42 in)
- Seat height: 765 mm (30.1 in)
- Weight: 103 Kg (dry)
- Fuel capacity: 10.5 L (2.3 imp gal; 2.8 US gal)
- Oil capacity: 1.3 L (0.29 imp gal; 0.34 US gal)
- Fuel consumption: 25-40 kmpl

The Yamaha RX 100 was a two-stroke motorcycle made by Yamaha from 1985 to 1996 with technical collaboration and distributed in India by the Escorts Group. The RX100 was known for its agility and acceleration. At the initial stage, Yamaha Japan was exporting all bikes from Japan to India. After 1990, Escorts started production in India, with some parts being imported from Japan.

== History ==
The RX100 designation was originally used in certain markets for the five-speed, short-stroke 97cc Yamaha RS100DX produced from 1977. This was an RS100 (itself a 1976 improvement upon the design of the original reed-valved 96cc RS100 that was introduced to the United Kingdom in September, 1974, and to the US in November, 1974) with a front disc brake and a tachometer, and was replaced in 1983 with the square-stroke, 98cc RX-S (with part numbers coded 31J), a major update on the RS design (with substantial changes particularly to the cylinder, head, and induction, and the points ignition replaced by Yamaha Capacitor Discharge Ignition) which was to form the basis of the Escort-distributed variants including the EY-100 Escort Yamaha 100. The Escort variants of the RX-S had heavier gauge steel tubing and other changes specific to the Indian market, including slotted screws instead of the original Phillips. Names of older variants of the RS line were re-used for Escort variants of the RX-S, including RX100 and RX-Z (a designation first used for a version of the first-generation RS100 updated with Capacitor Discharge Ignition)

A Yamaha RX-100 accelerates to top speed.

Following the poor sales of the Rajdoot 350, Yamaha needed to make a new product, and the recent success of Suzuki's AX 100 demonstrated the potential of small-capacity motorbikes in India.

In India in March 1985, Yamaha released the RX 100 (a variant of the RX-S, not the original RX100 or RS100DX) to widespread acclaim. The appeal came largely from the high output of its 100 cc (6.1 cu in) engine. With its lightweight body and high power output, the resulting power to weight ratio of the bike made it the best 100 cc bike ever built for mass production, and as a result there is still a high demand for it many years after it ceased production.

The RX 100 was quickly adopted by racers who recognized its potential for drag racing. Various modifications such as expansion chambers, head porting, engine tuning, sprocket changes and wheel size changes became fairly common. A large number of customization options include larger carburetors, air filters, quicker throttle, disc brakes, an additional 5th gear, race pistons, racing CDI systems, upgraded tires and suspension damping. Tuned RX 100's have completed a standing start quarter-mile in about 14 seconds – a respectable figure, considering the much larger BMW-S1000RR 4-Cylinder 1,000 cc (61 cu in) bike can cover one-quarter mile (0.4 km) in 10.2 seconds. The bikes were knock-down kits, produced in Japan and assembled in India. An easy differentiation between the Japanese and Indian market models was that the model produced in Japan had disc brakes, while the Indian market version had drum brakes front and rear.

Factory stock colours for the bikes were Peacock Blue, Cherry Red, Maroon, Metallic Black, and New Black. The only major change that the bike underwent was upgrading from a 6-volt electrical system to a 12-volt system in order to support a CDI (capacitor discharge ignition) system for improved ignition and timing. The RX 100 production lasted from November 1985 to March 1996. During this period, the Yamaha RX125, powered by a 123 cc two-stroke engine producing 15 PS and equipped with a five-speed gearbox, was showcased at the 1993 Auto Expo and evaluated in pre-production form, with a planned launch in early 1994, but it was never brought into mass production. The tightening of emissions laws and regulations in India demanded lower emissions from these motorcycles, and as a result the RX 100 was replaced by the Yamaha RXG.

The RXG had a primary and secondary reduction. It had the same lightened flywheel from the RX 100 which caused unpleasantly abrupt acceleration. Yamaha replaced it with a heavier flywheel the following year. Then came the Yamaha RX-Z in 1997, with a new chassis and shorter wheelbase, with the same primary reduction ratio as the RX100 but with a taller final reduction. The RX-Z was launched with sportier bodywork and produced 12 bhp (8.9 kW) at 6,500rpm. Following the RX-Z, the RX135 was launched in 1998 with the same engine as the RXZ but using the same chassis as the RX 100 or RXG. The RX135 saw a moderate success due to its refined power output and better fuel economy. In 2000 Yamaha launched the RX135 5 speed with a large catalytic converter muffler (silencer). It's had a higher compression ratio and different port dimensions. It fared poorly in the India market due to its lower fuel economy, lack of marketing and quieter exhaust note which is departure from original rx series. It was discontinued after two years. The RX 135 5 speed was later recognized as the quickest RX-series bike and has a continued cult status due to its rarity. A 5-speed variant of the RX-Z with front disc brakes also had a limited release in 2001.

The final variant was a 4-speed RX 135 with a smaller catalytic converter silencer, classic rx100 like tank stripes and twin pod speedometer with white dials which was sold very briefly from 2003 to 2005.

== Successors ==
The Yamaha RX 100 production run lasted from November 1985 to March 1996. The model was followed by the 132 cc RX G. The RX G had an economy-minded engine configuration with the ports tuned to increase fuel-efficiency and decrease exhaust gas. This model was the reply to the stricter emissions controls, which were to continue affecting Yamaha's designs. The Japanese manufacturers responded in late 1997 with the Yamaha RX-135 and the RX-Z which had a tachometer and a sportier headlamp and body. Both were mechanically the same and the RX-135 received a lukewarm response. The market also saw five-speed versions of the RX-135s and RX-Z. The final variant was a four-speed RX 135 with a small type catalytic converter, sporting a fuel gauge and a speedometer with white dials which was sold very briefly in 2003–2005.

== Models ==
- Yamaha Rx 100 CKD KIT (1985–87)
- Yamaha RX 100 (1987 last-1995)
- Yamaha RX 125 (Showcase in Auto Expo 1993, Never Launched)
- Yamaha RX 100 12 V (1996)
- Yamaha RXG (1996–1998)
- Yamaha RX Z 4 Speed (1997–2000)
- Yamaha RX 135 (YEIS) (1998–2000)
- Yamaha RX 135 5 Speed (2000–2003)
- Yamaha RX Z 5 speed (2000–2003)
- Yamaha RX 135 4 Speed (Cat-Con) (2001–2003)
- Yamaha RX 135 4 Speed (Mini- Cat) (2003–2005)
