= Teji Bachchan =

Amitabh Bachchan's mother

- Born: Tejwant Kaur Suri; 12 August 1914; Lyallpur, Punjab, British India
- Died: 21 December 2007 (aged 93); Mumbai, Maharashtra, India
- Occupation: Social activist
- Spouse: Harivansh Rai Bachchan (m. 1941; died 2003)
- Children: 2 (including Amitabh Bachchan)
- Parents: Sardar Khazan Singh Suri (father); Amar Kaur Sodhi (mother)
- Relatives: Bachchan family

Teji Bachchan (née Tejwant Kaur Suri; 12 August 1914 – 21 December 2007) was an Indian social activist, the wife of Hindi poet Harivansh Rai Bachchan and mother of Bollywood actor Amitabh Bachchan.

== Biography ==
Teji Bachchan was born as Tejwant Kaur Suri into a Punjabi Sikh family in Lyallpur, Punjab Province, British India (present-day Faisalabad, Punjab, Pakistan). After completing her education, she took a job of teaching psychology at Khoob Chand Degree College, Lahore. She met Harivansh Rai Srivastava (later Harivansh Rai Bachchan; 27 November 1907 – 18 January 2003), then a lecturer of English at Allahabad University, when he attended a college event in Lahore. The couple got married in Allahabad in 1941, and upon her wedding, Teji became a home maker. Teji was Harivansh's second wife, he having previously married a woman named Shyama in 1926 and who died out of tuberculosis in 1936. Teji remained a lover of the stage, and she would also sing at social gatherings if pressed. During his lifetime, Harivansh remained completely engrossed in his work, leaving his wife to handle all family matters. Even in social engagements, the poet willingly played a minor role to his sociable wife. The Bachchans had two sons: Amitabh Bachchan (born 11 October 1942) and Ajitabh Bachchan (born 18 May 1947).

The Bachchans were a part of India's literary circuit and high society. The couple sang at events.

Teji played Lady Macbeth in her husband's Hindi adaptation of Macbeth. They also played a cameo appearance in Yash Chopra's 1976 film, Kabhi Kabhie.

She was also appointed as one of the Directors of the Film Finance Corporation in 1973. The Film Finance Corporation of India (and its successor National Film Development Corporation of India), a Government of India undertaking's main objective was to finance the production of purposeful films of good quality with a view to improving the general standards of the medium.

Bachchan was in the Lilavati Hospital for almost the whole of the year 2007 and she was shifted to the ICU in November 2007 after her condition became worse. She died at the age of 93 on 21 December 2007 after a prolonged illness.
