= Rajdoot GTS 175 =

- Rajdoot GTS 175
- Manufacturer: Escorts Limited
- Also called: Bobby
- Parent company: Escorts Group
- Production: 1973–1984
- Class: Mini motorcycle
- Engine: 173 cc, air-cooled, single-cylinder, two-stroke
- Transmission: 3-speed manual
- Related: Rajdoot

The Rajdoot GTS 175, commonly known as the Bobby, was a mini motorcycle manufactured by Escorts Group in India from 1973 to 1984. It was powered by a 173 cc, two-stroke engine.

== History ==
Rajdoot GTS 175 (Bobby) at the Statesman Vintage and Classic Car Rally, held at the Eastern Command Sports Stadium, Fort William, Kolkata, on 28 January 2018.

Rajdoot GTS-175

The Rajdoot GTS 175 was developed by Escorts in the early 1970s as a compact motorcycle using components from other vehicles in the company's Rajdoot range. Escorts had previously entered the scooter market with the Rajhans, which did not achieve commercial success. The company also had unused components from the Rajdoot Ranger. Rajdoot GTS 175 was developed by combining components from these earlier models, including the engine and transmission of the full-sized Rajdoot 175, wheels from the Rajhans scooter and a fuel tank associated with the Ranger. It was named Grand Tourismo Sports (GTS) 175.

The GTS 175 was launched in 1973. It was powered by a 173 cc, air-cooled, single-cylinder, two-stroke engine with a three-speed gearbox, shared with the larger Rajdoot 175. Its smaller frame and wheels gave it a compact design. It was often compared to small recreational motorcycles such as the Honda Monkey.

The motorcycle gained popularity after appearing in the 1973 Hindi film Bobby. Following the film's release, it became popularly known as the "Bobby bike".

Te model was discontinued in 1984. Surviving examples have since been preserved and restored by vintage motorcycle enthusiasts.

== See also ==
- Rajdoot Excel-T
- SHL M11 175
