= Rajdoot Excel-T =

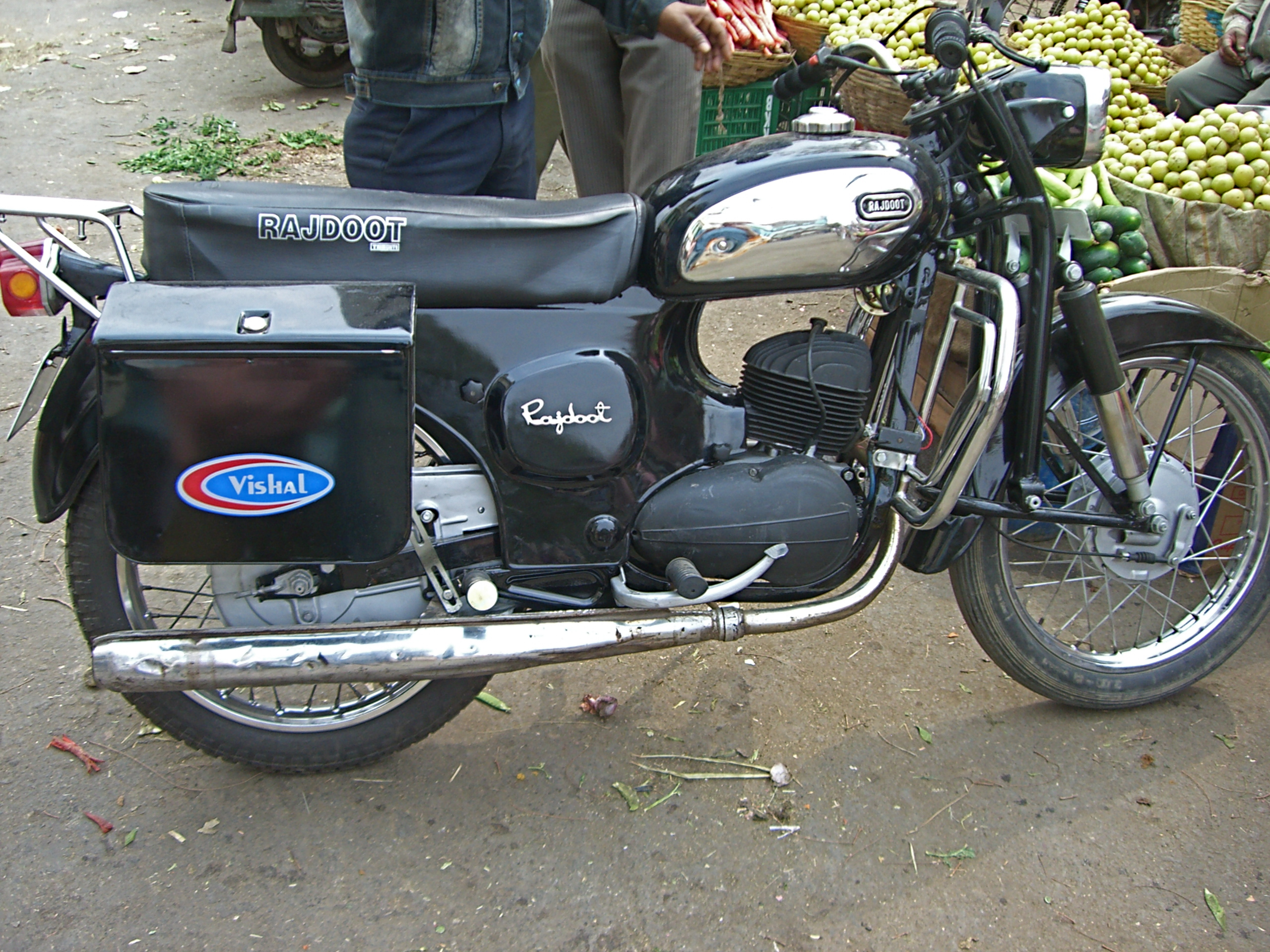
- Manufacturer: Escorts Group
- Production: 1962-2005
- Engine: 173 cc two-stroke
- Bore / stroke: 61.5 mm × 58 mm (2.42 in × 2.28 in)
- Fuel capacity: 13 litres (2.9 imp gal; 3.4 US gal)

The Rajdoot Excel T is a 173 cc two-stroke motorcycle that was made in India by Escorts Group, which became part of Yamaha in 2001.

The motorcycle division of Escorts Group started manufacturing the Polish SHL M11 175 cc motorcycle under the brand name Rajdoot from 1962. Various derivatives were produced with slight changes in cycle parts, suspension and transmission. Production continued for over four decades.

Rajdoot sold about 1.6 million of these black, "Soviet"–styled motorbikes, in the Excel T and Deluxe models, until it was phased out in 2005 due to impending Euro II emission regulations.

== See also ==
- Rajdoot GTS 175
