= WFM (motorcycle) =

Defunct Polish motorcycle manufacturer

Warszawska Fabryka Motocykli
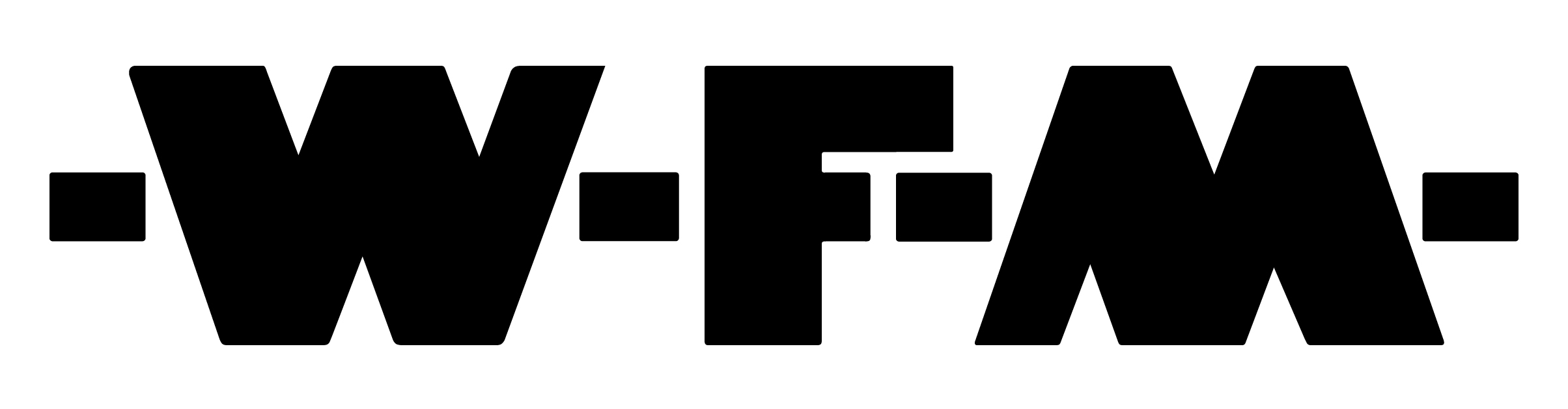
- WFM logo

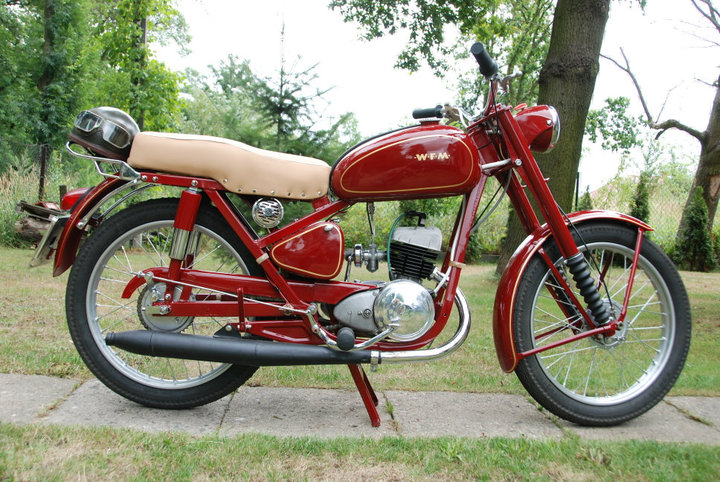
- 1961 WFM M06
- Traded as: WFM
- Industry: Motorcycle manufacturing
- Predecessor: Warsaw Automobile Repair Plant
- Founded: 1951 in Warsaw, Poland
- Defunct: 1966
- Successor: Polish Optical Works (PZO)
- Products: WFM M06; WFM Osa

Warszawska Fabryka Motocykli (English: Warsaw Motorcycle Factory), commonly known by its initials WFM, is a defunct Polish motorcycle manufacturer. The motorcycles were manufactured in a factory located at 25 Ulica Mińska in the Warsaw district of Grochów.

== History ==
The Warszawskich Zakładów Naprawy Samochodów (English: Warsaw Automobile Repair Plant) was established in 1947 by the amalgamation of the state-run Zakłady Urządzeń Transportowego No. 2 (English: Transport Equipment Plant No. 2) and the Państwowe Zakłady Samochodowych No. 2 (English: State Automobile Plant No. 2). Amongst other activities, the workshop produced SHL M04 motorcycles for SHL from pre-war spares from Huta Ludwików and DKW engines. Later the engine designed for the Sokół 125 cc was used. The factory turned exclusively to motorcycle production in 1951 and the name was changed to Warszawska Fabryka Motocykli (WFM). The first motorcycles were delivered in 1952.

Initially they produced 125 cc motorcycles for Wytwórni Sprzętu Komunikacyjnego of Psie Pole and SHL of Kielce. From 1955, WFM produced their own branded motorcycles and scooters and also supplied engines and components to other motorcycle manufacturers.

Wacław Laskowski was the factory director for many years.

On 1 January 1965, the WFM plant was merged with the neighbouring Polish Optical Works (PZO) and production of motorcycles was gradually phased out. The WFM machinery was taken over by PZO, who continued to produce engines and spare parts.

== Models ==
Initial production was manufacturing the M04 for SHL, 27,000 machines were built between 1952 and June 1954. This model was superseded by the SHL M05, which had telescopic forks. 12,500 units of the M05 were built.

=== WFM M06 ===
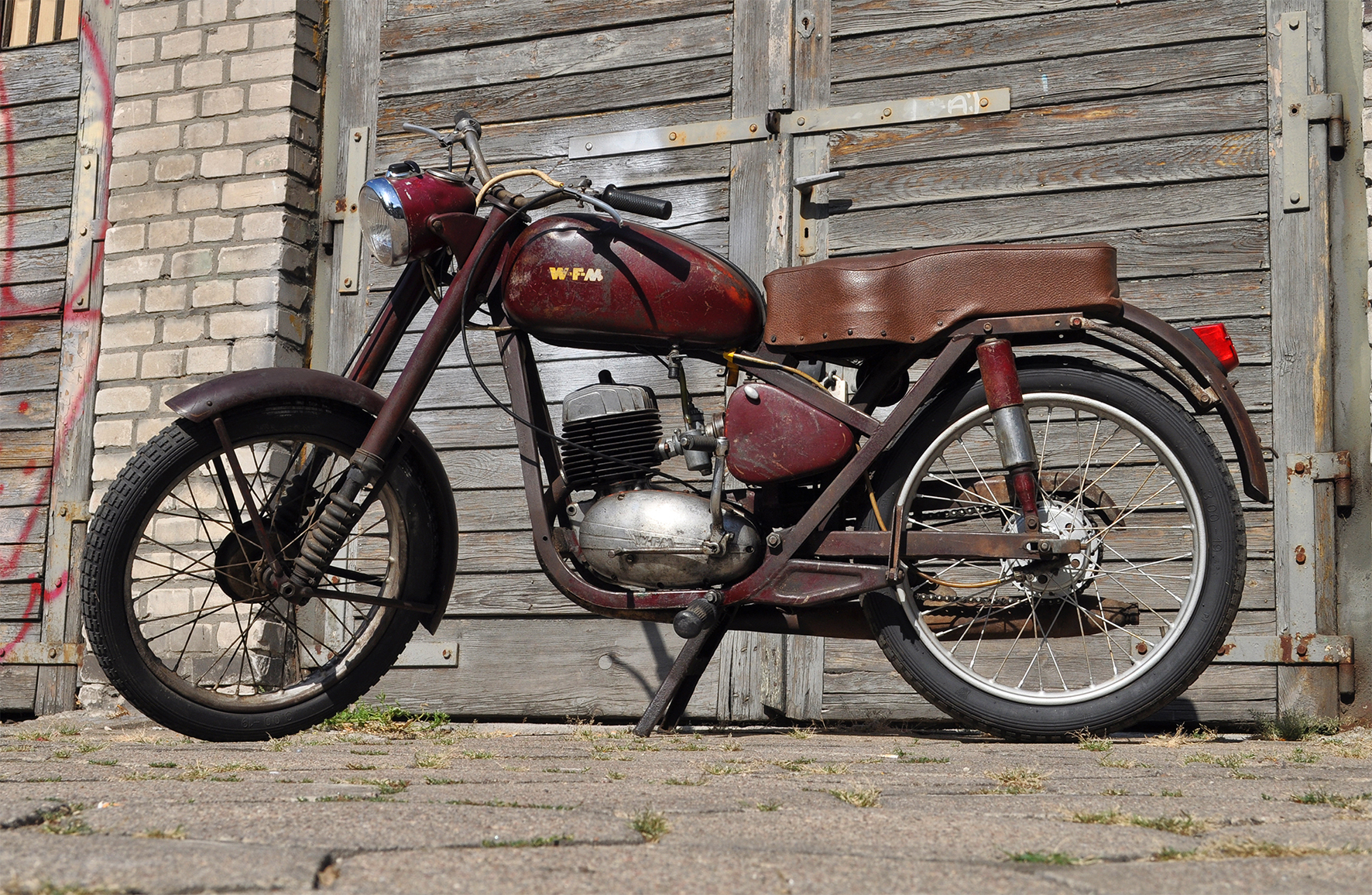
Original model 1964 WFM M06-S34

The 1955 M06 was the first model branded as a WFM. It was a development of the SHL M05 and used the same 123 cc S-01 engine. The cycle parts were copied from the SHL M05 model, which had swinging arm rear suspension. An export model was produced with a battery, electric horn and chromed wheel rims. The domestic model received these refinements in 1957. Upgrades to the carburettor and cylinder head were made in 1958. A new more powerful engine, the S-34, was fitted in 1963. By the time production ended in March 1966, around 600,000 motorcycles of this model had been produced.

=== WFM M16 Tarpan ===
A successor for the M06 was planned in 1962. It was to be a new design and able to compete with machines from Jawa and MZ. The machine had a spine frame and leading link forks. A new 175 cc engine was designed which featured a 5 speed gearbox, but never got off the drawing board. A few prototypes were made using the existing S32 engine, but the machine never went into production.

=== WFM Osa ===
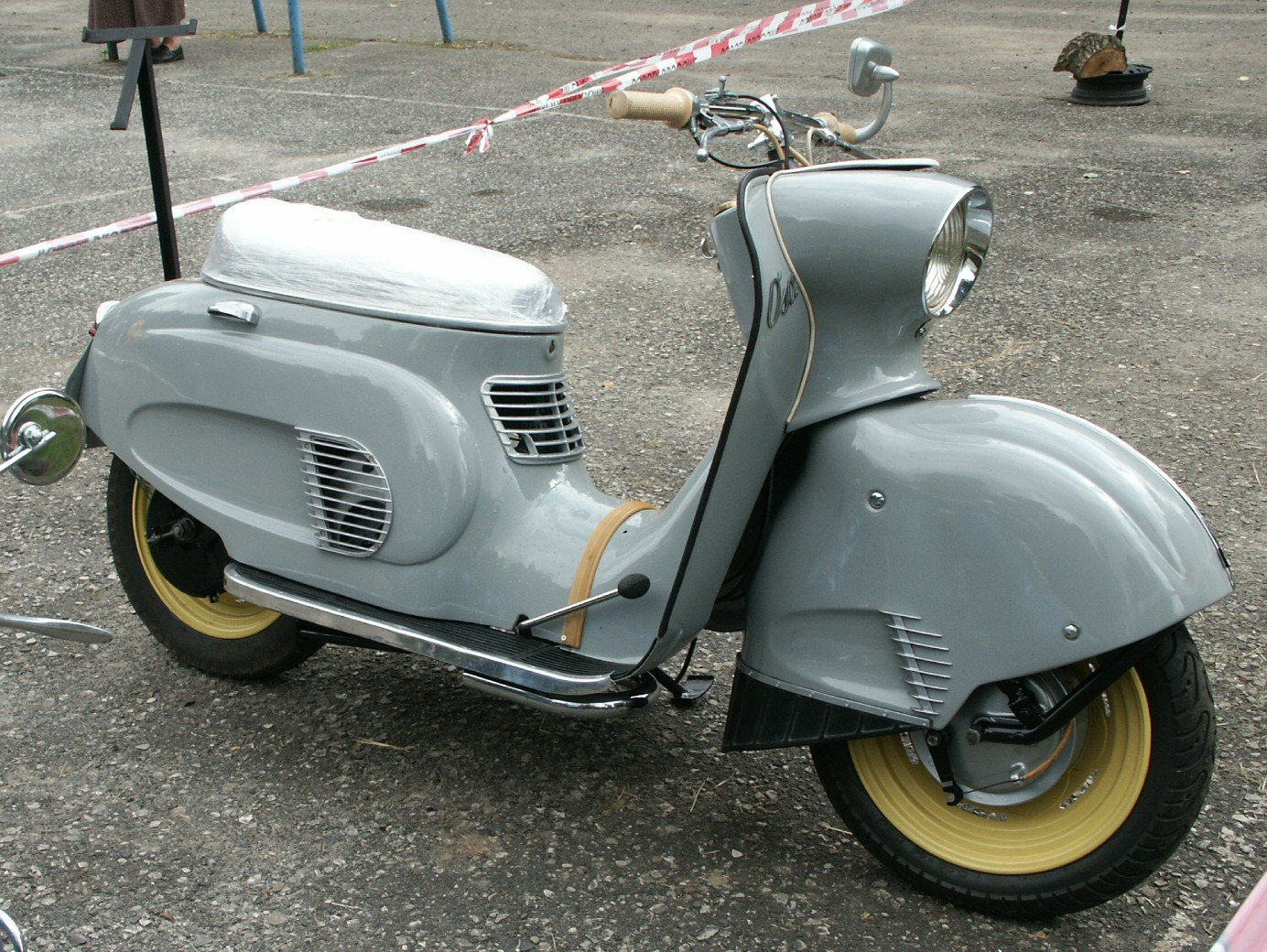
WFM Osa M52

In 1955, WFM designed 3 prototype scooters, all named after insects: Żuk (beetle), Bąk (bee) and Osa (wasp). There was resistance from the authorities towards what they viewed as a "ideologically hostile" product, and pre-production models of the Osa weren't produced until February 1959. The scooter used a 148 cc single-cylinder, two-stroke engine, designated S 06, which WFM had been supplying to SHL. The machine used 14 inch wheels. The machine went into full production as the Osa M50.

In 1962 the Osa M52 was introduced. This was fitted with the 175 cc S 33 engine. Much of the production of the M52 was exported to India. Production of the M50 was stopped in 1963 and the M52 in 1965.

== Competitions ==
WFM entered factory teams in a number of ISDT events between 1956 and 1963, including the 1959 17th International Tatra Rally, the 1960 XXXV Sześciodniówce FIM in Bad Aussee, Austria and the 1961 Scottish Sześciodniówce. Both 125 cc motorcycles and Osa scooters were used.

== Production 1951–1965 ==
- Motorcycles - 600,000
- Scooters - 28,000
- Engines - 250,000 units

== Resurrection ==
At the beginning of the 21st century, a project was created to reactivate the WFM brand in cooperation with the Minsk Motovelo Motorbike and Bicycle Factory in Belarus. The originator of the project was Włodzimierz Gąsiorek, who owned the WFM trademark through the Motor Klub Wawer. The motorcycle was a modification of the Minsk Lider, and was available in 50 cc and 125 cc versions.

== Bibliography ==
- Dziawer, Szymon (18 February 2003). "WFM wraca i nie będzie to już czerwona zaraza" [WFM is back and it won't be a Red Plague anymore]. Świat Motocykli (in Polish).
- Łempkowski, Maciek (26 August 2017). "Byłem przekonany, że się topię – 1988 BOGUSŁAW KOPERSKI" [I was convinced that I was drowning - 1988 BOGUSŁAW KOPERSKI]. Enduro banda docenta (in Polish). Archived from the original on 27 February 2020.
- Peszak, Janusz (2016). Polskie skutery WFM Osa M50, M52 TBiU NR 11 HISTORIA MOTORYZACJI - Janusz Peszak - Polska Ksiegarnia w UK [Polish scooters WFM Osa M50, M52 TBiU NO. 11 HISTORY OF THE AUTOMOTIVE] (in Polish). ZP Publishing House.
- Rochlin, R. P. (1953). Die Wirtschaft Polens Von 1945 Bis 1952 [The economy of Poland from 1945 to 1952] (in German). Duncker & Humblot. ISBN 978-3428012473.
- Truszkiewicz, Zbigniew (15 May 1959). "Samochód popularny pod znakiem zapytania Przemysł pomocniczy kuleje" [The popular car under the question] (PDF) (in Polish). Dziennik Bałtycki.
- Zieliński, Andrzej (2004). Polskie motocykle 1946-1985 (Wyd. 3 ed.). Warszawa: Wydawnictwa Komunikacji i Łączności. ISBN 978-83-206-1518-0.
- "I kwartał eksperymentów gospodarczych warszawskich zakładach przemysłowych" [The first quarter of economic experiments in Warsaw industrial plants] (PDF). Życie Warszawy (in Polish). 4 April 1957. Archived from the original (PDF) on 27 February 2020.
