= Madhushala =

Hindi poem book by Harivansh Rai Bachchan

- Author: Harivansh Rai Bachchan
- Language: Hindi
- Genre: Hindi Poem
- Publisher: Hind Pocket Books
- Publication date: 1935
- Publication place: India
- Media type: Print (Hardback & Paperback)
- ISBN: 81-216-0125-8
- Followed by: Madhubala

Madhushala (Hindi: मधुशाला, lit. 'tavern/bar, house of wine') is a book of 135 quatrains: verses of four lines (Ruba'i) by Hindi poet and writer Harivansh Rai Bachchan (1907–2003). The highly metaphorical work is still celebrated for its deeply Vedantic and Sufi incantations and philosophical undertones and is an important work in the Chhayavad (Neo-romanticism) literary movement of early 20th century Hindi literature.

All the ruba'ia (the plural for ruba'i) end in the word madhushala. The poet tries to explain the complexity of life with his four instruments, which appear in almost every verse: madhu, madira or hala (wine), saki (server), pyala (cup or glass) and of course madhushala, madiralaya (pub or bar).

The publication of the work in 1935 brought Harivansh Rai Bachchan instant fame, and his own recitation of the poems became a craze at poetry symposiums.

Madhushala was part of his trilogy inspired by Omar Khayyam's Rubaiyat, which he had earlier translated into Hindi. The other titles in the trilogy were Madhubala (Hindi: मधुबाला, lit. 'sweet girl, honey bee') (1936) and Madhukalash (Hindi: मधुकलश, lit. 'wine decanter, honey pot/flask') (1937).

== Madhushala in Media ==
A recording of selected Ruba'i from Madhushala was released by His Master's Voice, where twenty stanzas were chosen and sung by Manna Dey, while Bachchan himself sang the first one. The music was composed by Jaidev. His son, actor Amitabh Bachchan, has read the verses on several occasions, most notably at Lincoln Center, New York City. The text has also been choreographed for stage performances.

== Example Text from the Poem ==
This is the famous 50th stanza of the poem:

Devnagri transcription	English translation
मुसलमान-ओ-हिन्दू है दो, एक, मगर, उनका प्याला, एक, मगर, उनका मदिरालय, एक, मगर, उनकी हाला, दोनों रहते एक न जब तक मस्जिद मन्दिर में जाते, बैर बढ़ाते मस्जिद मन्दिर मेल कराती मधुशाला!	Muslims and Hindus are two but their glasses are one But their bar is one, and their wine is one Both are equal until they enter a temple or a mosque Temple and mosques increases enmity [between religions], but bar makes equality.

== Text ==
- मधु शाला ISBN 81-216-0125-8.
- Madhushala by Harivansh Rai Bachchan. Penguin Books, 1990. ISBN 0-14-012009-2.
- Madhushala by Harivansh Rai Bachchan, in German, Draupadi-Verlag, Heidelberg (Germany), 2009. ISBN 978-3-937603-40-7.
