= Southern Hockey League =

Southern Hockey League may refer to two different professional ice hockey leagues:

- Southern Hockey League (1973–1977)
- Southern Hockey League (1995–96)
