= Babupatti =

- Village
- Location in Uttar Pradesh, India Babupatti (India)
- Coordinates: 25.782693°N 82.018904°E
- Country: India
- State: Uttar Pradesh
- District: Pratapgarh

Government
  - Body: Gram panchayat

Languages
  - Official: Hindi
  - Additional official: Urdu
  - Regional: Awadhi
- Time zone: UTC+5:30 (IST)
- PIN: 230304
- Vehicle registration: UP-72
- Nearest city: Pratapgarh
- Website: up.gov.in

Babupatti is a village in the Raniganj tehsil of Pratapgarh district, Uttar Pradesh state, India. Babu Patti is a variant spelling.

== Notable people ==
- Harivansh Rai Bachchan, Hindi poet and writer, father of actor Amitabh Bachchan.

Noted actress and Rajya Sabha MP Jaya Bachchan on 5 March 2006 inaugurated "Dr Harivansh Rai Bachchan Memorial Library" at the village.
