= SHL Medical =

Swiss medical technology company

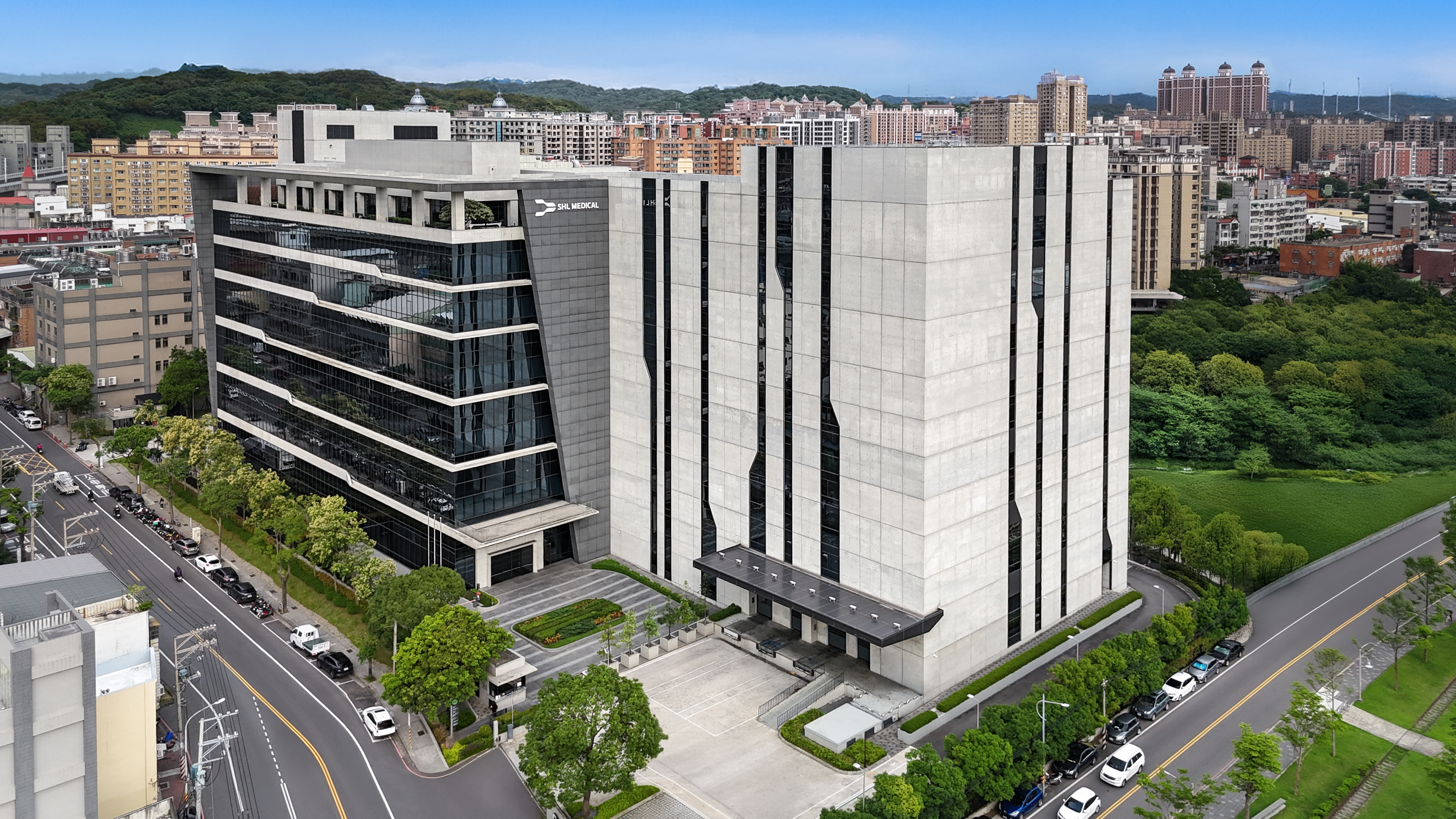
- Company type: Private
- Industry: Medical technology
- Founded: 1989
- Founders: Roger Samuelsson, Martin Jelf
- Headquarters: Zug, Switzerland
- Key people: Ulrich Fässler (CEO and Chairman), Roger Samuelsson (Founder and majority owner)
- Products: Drug delivery systems, autoinjectors, pen injectors
- Number of employees: 6,000+ (2024)
- Website: www.shl-medical.com

SHL Medical is a Swiss medical technology company that develops drug delivery devices such as autoinjectors and pen injectors. It is one of the world’s largest manufacturers of autoinjectors, serving major biopharmaceutical firms globally.

Founded in 1989 in Taiwan by Swedish entrepreneur Roger Samuelsson, the company has since developed a global presence, with production and operations in Europe, Asia, and North America. As of 2024, the privately held company employed more than 6,000 people.

== History ==
=== Founding and early years ===
SHL Medical was established in 1989 in Taiwan by Swedish entrepreneurs Roger Samuelsson and Martin Jelf as Scandinavian Health Limited (SHL). Initially, the company aimed to build a production base for medical and hospital equipment.

In 1994, SHL won a contract with the U.S. pharmaceutical company Upjohn to produce a pen-type injection device. Forbes later described the Upjohn deal as an early commercial breakthrough for the company.

The Financial Times reported that the initial Upjohn order was manufactured in rented factory space and that SHL, by 2006, had expanded to five plants in Taiwan and one in China. According to Forbes, SHL had also begun investing in machinery to automate production.

=== Shift to autoinjectors and international expansion ===
In 2004, Samuelsson bought out Martin Jelf’s stake and became the sole owner of the company. Forbes reported that the company subsequently focused on autoinjectors and secured a contract with Amgen in 2006 to manufacture autoinjectors for Enbrel, a biologic medicine.

In 2010, SHL opened a facility for final assembly in Florida, where SHL already had a design center since 2004.

In 2018, the company moved its corporate headquarters to Zug, Switzerland. Also in 2018, Swiss engineer Ulrich Fässler became CEO and chairman; he had joined the company in 2010 after SHL integrated his mold-making business.

In 2020, Swedish private equity firm EQT acquired a 31% stake in SHL, while founder Roger Samuelsson retained 69%. Forbes reported valuations of about US$2.1 billion (2020) and US$3.4 billion (end of 2022).

=== GLP-1 related demand growth and manufacturing expansion ===
In the early 2020s, demand for SHL’s drug delivery devices increased alongside the growing use of GLP-1 receptor agonist therapies such as Ozempic and Wegovy. By 2024, Forbes reported that SHL Medical derives approximately 90% of its revenue from autoinjectors and holds about 25% of the global market in this segment.

In November 2024, SHL announced plans to establish SHL Advantec, a subsidiary for tooling and automation services. In 2023 and 2024, SHL acquired several companies in related areas, including LCA Automation AG (July 2023), Superior Tooling Inc. (January 2024), and SMC Mould Innovation (May 2024).

In 2025, SHL opened a US$220 million, fully automated manufacturing facility in North Charleston, South Carolina (360,000 sq ft; 33,500 m²). The facility manufactures autoinjectors for the U.S. market.

== Operations and ownership ==
Headquartered in Zug, Switzerland, SHL has manufacturing and operational facilities in Taiwan, Sweden, Mexico, Switzerland, China and the United States. As of 2024, SHL employed more than 6,000 people worldwide. Most of its workforce is based in Taiwan, where the company’s largest production site is located.

SHL is a privately held Aktiengesellschaft, a corporation limited by share ownership. As of 2024, founder Roger Samuelsson owned approximately 69% of SHL Medical, with the remaining 31% held by EQT and Athos KG.

== Products and services ==
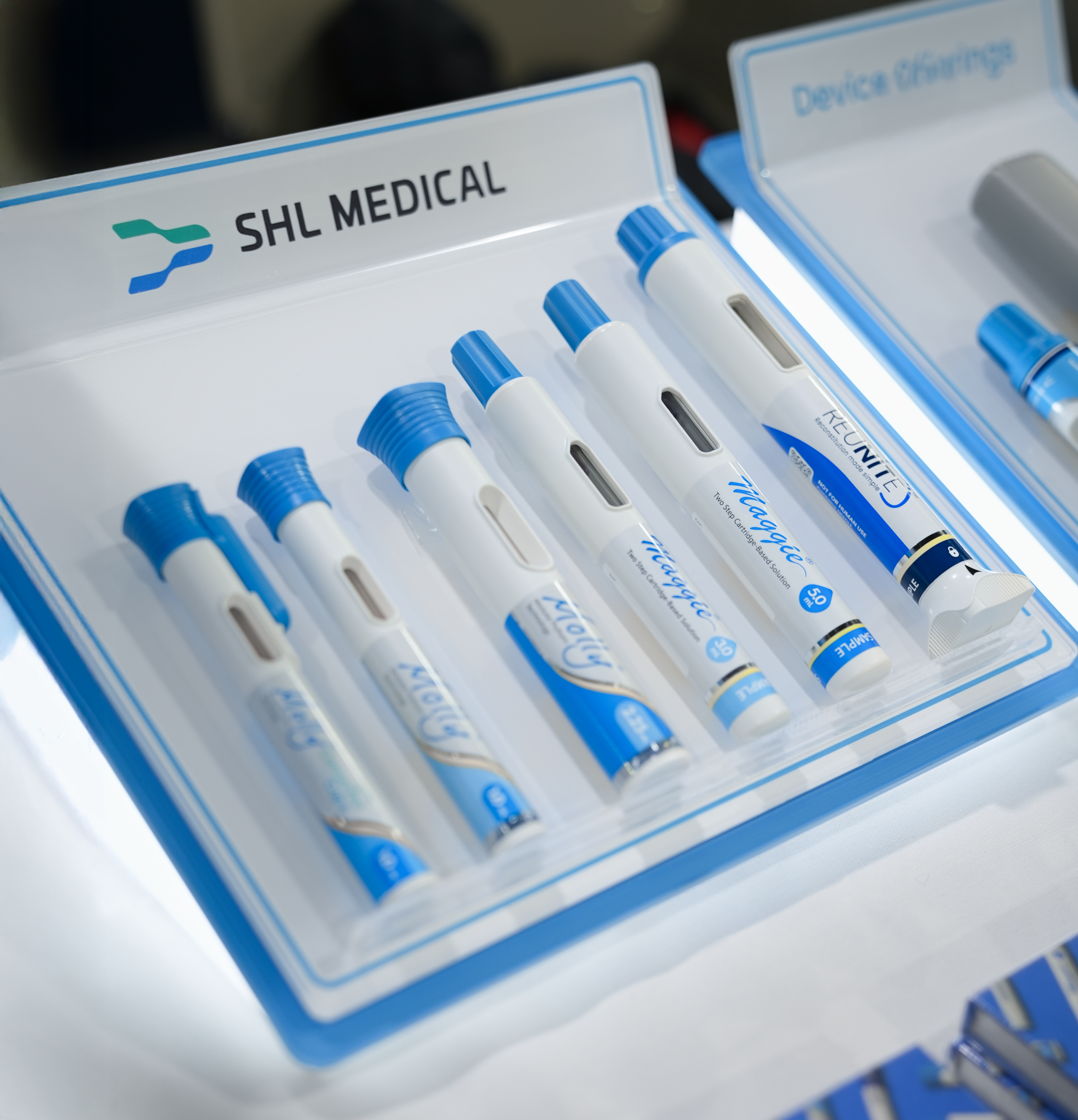
Products manufactured by SHL Medical, 2025

SHL Medical develops and manufactures drug-delivery devices for self-injection of medicines. Its products include single-use autoinjectors, pen injectors, and systems designed for large-volume and high-viscosity formulations.

According to Forbes, the company supplies injectors used with medicines across multiple therapeutic areas.

SHL Advantec, a subsidiary of SHL Medical, provides tooling and automation services for healthcare manufacturing and other industries.

== Recognition and awards ==
In 2009, SHL Medical received a Red Dot Award: Product Design for its Precision Pen Injector (PPI).

In 2011, SHL Medical received the Good Design Award for its autoinjector Molly.

A 2019 Handelszeitung analysis listed SHL Medical among the Swiss companies with the highest number of patent filings at the European Patent Office.

In 2025, SHL Medical received the Zug Innovation Prize for its Elexy autoinjector. The jury noted its adaptable design for different injection volumes and viscosities.
