= Shweta Bachchan =

Indian author, journalist, and model (born 1974)

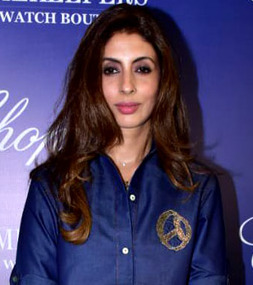
- Bachchan in 2018
- Born: 17 March 1974 (age 52); Bombay, Maharashtra, India
- Education: Boston University
- Occupations: Journalist; host; model
- Years active: 2006–present
- Spouse: Nikhil Nanda (m. 1997)
- Children: 2
- Parents: Amitabh Bachchan (father); Jaya Bhaduri (mother)
- Family: Bachchan family (by birth); Kapoor family (by marriage)

Shweta Bachchan Nanda (née Bachchan, pronounced [ˈbətːʃən]; born 17 March 1974) is an Indian columnist, author, and former model . She has been a columnist for Daily News and Analysis and Vogue India, and is the author of the bestselling novel Paradise Towers. She has worked as a model for television advertisement, and in 2018 launched her own fashion label, MXS.

== Personal life ==
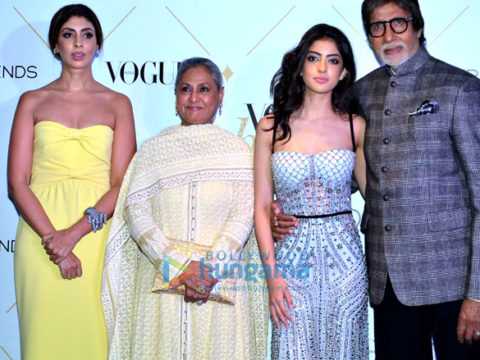
Bachchan Nanda with parents Amitabh and Jaya Bachchan and daughter Navya Naveli Nanda at Vogue Beauty Awards 2017

Shweta Bachchan was born to Bollywood actors Amitabh Bachchan and Jaya Bachchan on 17 March 1974. She attended Boston University.

Bachchan married Escorts Group businessman Nikhil Nanda on 16 February 1997, who is the son of Ritu Nanda, the daughter of Hindi film actor-producer Raj Kapoor, and of Rajan Nanda. The couple has two children, daughter Navya Naveli Nanda (born December 1997), an entrepreneur and son Agastya Nanda (born November 2000), an actor.

== Career ==
Bachchan Nanda modeled for the first time in September 2006, for a magazine entitled L'Officiel India. She appeared in the seventh annual issue of the same magazine, in June 2009, with her brother Abhishek Bachchan.

In 2007, Bachchan Nanda became the leader in the category – Next Generation – during NDTV Profit. A series of interviews was broadcast on the channel. Since 2018, she has been the brand ambassador for Kalyan Jewellers.

She has been a columnist with Daily News and Analysis and Vogue India. The Tribune praised her columns as "funny" and "insightful".

Along with Monisha Jaising, she launched in 2018 the fashion label MXS.

In October 2018, Bachchan Nanda launched her debut novel, Paradise Towers, published by HarperCollins. The book became a bestseller despite negative reviews. Ishita Sengupta of The Indian Express reviewed the book, observing, "The novel, for all its elegance, ultimately, reads like it has a bunch of characters in search of a plot."

Bachchan Nanda has also written the forewords for Aishwarya Rajinikanth's 2016 book Standing on an Apple Box: The Story of a Girl among the Stars and Rukhsana Eisa's book The Golden Code: Mastering the Art of Social Success.

== Bibliography ==
- Bachchan-Nanda, Shweta (6 October 2018). Paradise Towers. HarperCollins Publishers India. ISBN 978-93-5302-316-4.
