= Nikhil Nanda =

Indian businessman (born 1973)

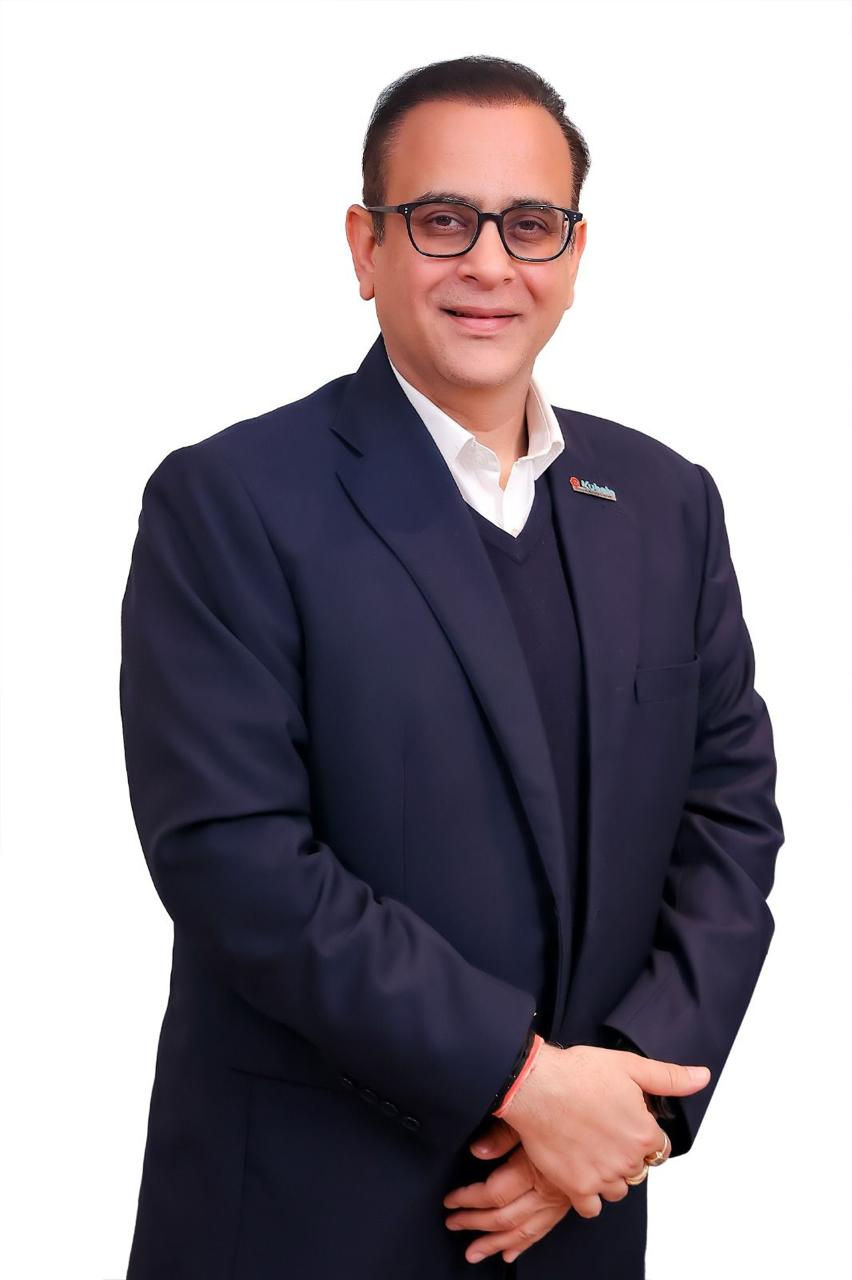
- Born: 18 March 1973 (age 53); New Delhi, Delhi, India
- Education: University of Pennsylvania
- Occupation: Businessman
- Organization: Escorts Kubota Limited
- Title: Chairman & Managing Director
- Spouse: Shweta Bachchan (m. 1997)
- Children: 2
- Relatives: Kapoor family; Bachchan family

Nikhil Nanda (born 18 March 1973) is an Indian businessman, currently serving as the Chairman and Managing Director (CMD) of Escorts Kubota Limited (formerly Escorts Limited), an Indian multinational engineering conglomerate that specialises in agricultural and construction equipment and machinery. He is a third-generation entrepreneur, being the grandson of Har Prasad Nanda, who founded the company in 1944, and son of Rajan Nanda, who served as the CMD of the group until August 2018.

== Early life and background ==
Nikhil Nanda was born on 18 March 1973 in New Delhi to a Punjabi Hindu family. His father, Rajan Nanda from Fazilka, was an industrialist and the Chairman and Managing Director of Escorts Group. His mother, Ritu Nanda (daughter of Raj Kapoor and Krishna Kapoor), worked as an insurance agent for Life Insurance Corporation. Nanda's sister, Nitasha Nanda, also works at Escorts Kubota Limited and is a member of its Board of Directors.

He did his primary schooling from Hillgrange Preparatory School in Dehradun. He is an alumnus of The Doon School in Dehradun, India. After completing his schooling, he studied business management at Wharton School, University of Pennsylvania, United States, where he majored in finance and marketing.

His maternal grandfather was actor-director Raj Kapoor and his great-grandfather, Prithviraj Kapoor, was an actor. Actors Rishi Kapoor, Randhir Kapoor and Rajiv Kapoor are his maternal uncles, while actresses Neetu Singh and Babita are his aunts by marriage. Actors Karisma Kapoor, Kareena Kapoor Khan and Ranbir Kapoor are his maternal first cousins.

== Career ==
Nikhil Nanda joined Escorts Limited in 1997, initially serving as its Director and group Chief Operating Officer.

He was promoted to Joint Managing Director of the group in 2007, and in 2013 to Managing Director. Under his leadership, the company launched the Farmtrac premium tractor series in 2014. It also unveiled India's first-ever electric concept tractor in 2017, an automated concept tractor in 2018 and a hybrid concept tractor in 2019.

He took over as the Chairman and Managing Director (CMD) of the group in August 2018, after the death of his father Rajan Nanda.

In 2021, Escorts Limited entered into a collaboration with Kubota Corporation, with Kubota raising its equity stake in the group. The group was eventually renamed as Escorts Kubota Limited in 2022.

In 2022, Nikhil Nanda was appointed as the Senior Managing Executive Officer of Kubota Corporation, General Manager of “Value Innovative Farm and Industrial Machinery Strategy & Operations” of Kubota Corporation.

== Personal life ==
Nanda married Shweta Bachchan, daughter of film actors Amitabh Bachchan and Jaya Bachchan, on 16 February 1997. The couple has two children, daughter Navya Naveli Nanda (born December 1997), an entrepreneur, and son Agastya Nanda (born November 2000), an actor.

== Recognition and awards ==
In 2001, Nikhil Nanda was selected as one of the Global Leaders of Tomorrow by the World Economic Forum, Geneva. He was appointed by the Indian government to represent the country at the Indo-Spain CEOs Forum in 2017.
