= Har Prasad Nanda =

Indian automotive industrialist (1917–1999)

- Born: Devilal Dhatarwaliaa; 9 January 1917; Lahore, British India
- Died: 13 April 1999 (aged 82); New Delhi, India
- Occupation: Automobile industrialist
- Years active: 1944–1994
- Known for: Escorts Group
- Relatives: Nikhil Nanda (grandson)

Har Prasad Nanda (9 January 1917 – 13 April 1999), also spelled Har Parshad Nanda, was an Indian automotive industrialist and the founder of Escorts Group.

== Career ==
Nanda was born in Lahore (modern-day Pakistan) in British India, He had started the company as an agency in Lahore in 1944. Nanda moved to Delhi after India's independence in 1947 with 5,000 INR and two cars. In 1949, he took the franchise of Massey Ferguson tractors and by 1959, he was manufacturing tractors with technological help from Ursus Factory of Poland. He stepped down as the chairman in 1994.

== Personal life and death ==
H.P Nanda and his wife, Raj, have two sons, Rajan Nanda and Anil Nanda and two daughters, Veena Sakhuja and Nini Srivastava. His wife, Raj, died in 1990. Industrialist Nikhil Nanda is his grandson.

H.P Nanda died on 13 April 1999 after prolonged illness in New Delhi, India.

== Books ==
In 1992, his autobiography titled The Days of My Years was published.
