= Escorts Kubota Limited =

Indian multinational automotive engineering and manufacturing conglomerate pvt ltd

- Type: Public
- Traded as: BSE: 500495 NSE: ESCORTS
- Industry: Agricultural machinery Automotive; Engineering
- Founded: 1944; 82 years ago
- Founder: H P Nanda
- Headquarters: Faridabad, Haryana, India
- Area served: Worldwide
- Key people: Nikhil Nanda (chairman and MD)
- Products: Tractors; Backhoe loader; Cranes; Crop protection; Railway brake system; Railway couplers; Vibratory compactor
- Revenue: ▲₹9,248 crore (US$960 million) (FY 2024)
- Net income: ▲₹1,048 crore (US$110 million) (FY 2024)
- Owners: Kubota Corporation (53.50%); Nanda family (14%)
- Number of employees: 14,510 (2024)
- Website: www.escortskubota.com

Escorts Kubota Limited, formerly Escorts Limited, is an Indian multinational conglomerate that operates in the sectors of agricultural machinery, construction machinery, material handling, and railway equipment. Its headquarters are located in Faridabad, Haryana. The company was launched in 1944 and has marketing operations in more than 40 countries. Escorts manufactures tractors, automotive components, railway equipment, and construction and material handling equipment.

Escorts Kubota Limited's management team includes Nikhil Nanda as the Chairman and Managing Director and Seizi Fukuoka as Deputy Managing Director.

== History ==
Escorts Limited was originally founded as Escorts Agents Ltd. in 1944 by brothers Har Prasad Nanda and Yudi Nanda. They started a family owned business, Nanda Bus Company, in Lahore.

Escorts Limited was founded in 1960 after the company set up its manufacturing base at Faridabad and began manufacturing agricultural machinery, x-ray machines with Westinghouse and heating elements with Elpro.

In March 2020, Kubota Corporation acquired a 10% stake in Escorts Limited for ₹1,042 crore (US$140.62 million) through preferential allotment, while Escorts Limited acquired a 40% stake in Kubota's Indian subsidiary, Kubota Agri Machinery India Pvt Ltd, for ₹900 crore (US$121.46 million). In November 2021, Kubota increased its stake in Escorts Limited from 9.09% to 14.99% after acquiring an additional 5.90% stake through a preferential issue for ₹1,872 crore (US$253.25 million).

In June 2022, Kubota increased its stake to 44.80% following an open offer and subscription to new shares, and the company was renamed as Escorts Kubota Limited. Kubota's stake increased to 53.50% after the cancellation of all shares held by Escorts Benefit and Welfare Trust in the company.

In 2024, the NCLT approved a merger of Kubota Agricultural Machinery India Pvt Ltd and Escorts Kubota India Pvt Ltd with Escorts Kubota Limited.

== Businesses ==
=== Escorts Agri Machinery ===
Escorts Agri Machinery was launched in 1960. The company manufactures tractors under the brand names Farmtrac, Powertrac, and Steeltrac. The first Escorts tractors were produced in 1961 based on Ursus license. In 1969, a partnership with Ford was set up to produce licensed Ford tractors for India.

Escorts has a plant in Mrągowo, Poland, that was purchased from Pol-Mot in 2000, and four plants in India. There was an assembly plant in Tarboro, North Carolina, that was purchased from Long Agri, but the North American subsidiary went into receivership in 2008.

=== Escorts Kubota – Construction Equipment ===
Escorts Kubota Limited – Construction Equipment manufactures and markets construction and material handling equipment like Safe Cranes, Hydra Cranes, backhoe loaders & compactors. Formerly, Escorts Construction Equipment Limited, their manufacturing and assembly facility is located in Faridabad, Haryana.

=== Railway Equipment Division ===
The Railway Equipment Division manufactures and supplies critical railway components such as air brake systems, EP brake systems, draft gears and couplers, composition brake blocks, dampers, and rubber components to the Indian Railways. The manufacturing facility is located in Sector 24, Faridabad.

=== Escorts Auto Products ===
Escorts Auto Products manufactures auto suspension products such as shock absorbers, struts, and telescopic front forks for the automotive industry. The company collaborated with Fichtel & Sachs to introduce the concept of shock absorbers to be manufactured in India in 1966. In 2016, Escorts' Auto Products business was divested to Pune-based Badve Engineering.

=== Motorcycles ===
The motorcycle division of Escorts group used to manufacture Polish SHL M11 175 cc (10.7 cu in) motorcycles under the brand name Rajdoot from the early 1960s until 2005, including Rajdoot Excel-T, and Rajdoot GTS 175.

In the early 1980s, Escorts started making Yamaha motorcycles in India. Rajdoot 350 was launched in 1983, which was later followed by the Yamaha RX 100 in 1985. The "RX" name signified "Rajdoot × Yamaha". The motorcycle manufacturing unit in Faridabad, India, was sold to Yamaha in 2001 when Escorts decided to quit the motorcycle business to concentrate on tractors and auto components.

== Knowledge Management Centre ==
The Escorts Knowledge Management Centre (KMC) was created in 1976 and is spread over 100,000 square metres (0.039 mi^{2}) in Faridabad. The centre designs tractors. It has facilities such as an engine laboratory that has computerised test beds with online control, data acquisition, and analysis; an advanced vehicle testing laboratory; a noise vibration and harshness lab; a metrology lab; and a materials engineering lab.
