= List of Sahitya Akademi Award winners for Konkani =

List of winners of a literary honor in India

Sahitya Akademi Award for Konkani
- Award for contributions to Konkani literature
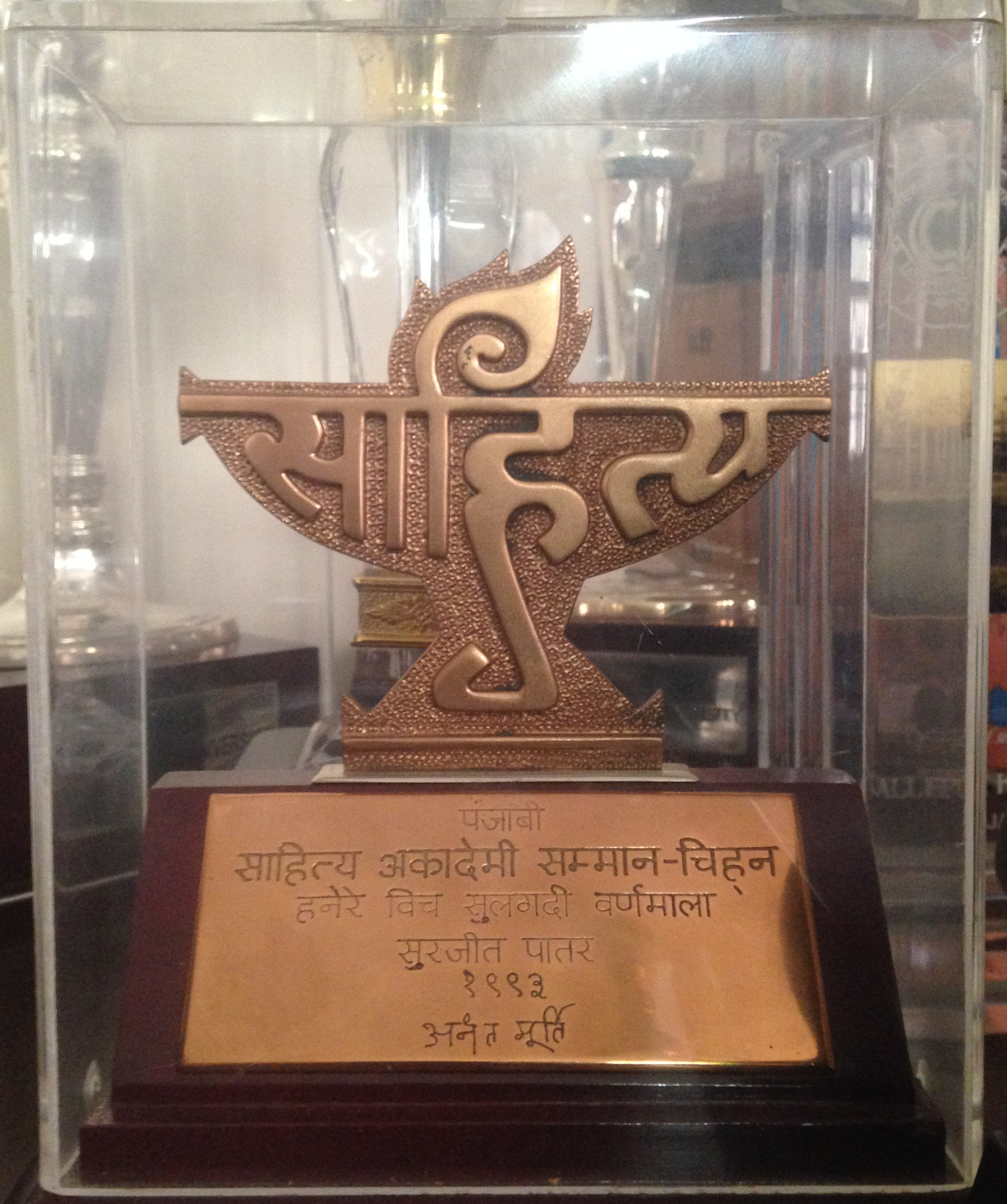
- Awarded for: Literary award in India
- Sponsored by: Sahitya Akademi, Government of India
- Reward: ₹1 lakh (US$1,100)
- First award: 1977
- Final award: 2024

Highlights
- Total awarded: 48
- First winner: Ravindra Kelekar
- Most Recent winner: Mukesh Thali
- Website: Official website

Part of a series on

Sahitya Akademi Awards
Category
Sahitya Akademi Award winners by language
- Assamese
- Bengali
- Bodo
- Dogri
- English
- Gujarati
- Hindi
- Kannada
- Kashmiri
- Konkani
- Maithili
- Malayalam
- Marathi
- Meitei (Manipuri)
- Nepali
- Odia
- Punjabi
- Rajasthani
- Sanskrit
- Santali
- Sindhi
- Tamil
- Telugu
- Urdu
Sahitya Akademi Translation Prizes
- Assamese
- Bengali
- Bodo
- Dogri
- English
- Gujarati
- Hindi
- Kannada
- Kashmiri
- Konkani
- Maithili
- Malayalam
- Marathi
- Meitei (Manipuri)
- Nepali
- Odia
- Punjabi
- Rajasthani
- Sanskrit
- Santali
- Sindhi
- Tamil
- Telugu
- Urdu
Sahitya Akademi Yuva Puraskar
- Assamese
- Bengali
- Bodo
- Dogri
- English
- Gujarati
- Hindi
- Kannada
- Kashmiri
- Konkani
- Maithili
- Malayalam
- Meitei (Manipuri)
- Marathi
- Nepali
- Odia
- Punjabi
- Rajasthani
- Sanskrit
- Santali
- Sindhi
- Tamil
- Telugu
- Urdu
Sahitya Akademi Bal Sahitya Puraskar
- Assamese
- Bengali
- Bodo
- Dogri
- English
- Gujarati
- Hindi
- Kannada
- Kashmiri
- Konkani
- Maithili
- Malayalam
- Meitei (Manipuri)
- Marathi
- Nepali
- Odia
- Punjabi
- Rajasthani
- Sanskrit
- Santali
- Sindhi
- Tamil
- Telugu
- Urdu
Related
- Eighth Schedule to the Constitution of India
- Official Languages Commission
- List of languages by number of native speakers in India

Sahitya Akademi Award is a literary honour given each year, since 1955, by Sahitya Akademi (India's National Academy of Letters), to writers and their works, for their outstanding contribution to the upliftment of Indian literature and Konkani literature in particular.

When the Sahitya Akademi recognised Konkani in 1975 as an independent and literary language, one of the important factors was the literary heritage of Romi Konkani since the year 1556. However, after Konkani in the Devanagari script was made the official language of Goa in 1987, the Sahitya Akademi has supported only writers in the Devanagari script.

== Winners ==
Year	Image	Author	Work
1977		Ravindra Kelekar	Himalayant (Travelogue)
1978		D. K. Sukhthankar	Manni Punav (Humorous essays)
1979		R. V. Pandit	Dorya Gazota (Poetry)
1980		Manohar Rai Sardesai	Pissolim (Poetry)
1981		B. B. Borkar	Sasay (Poetry)
1982	—	Laxmanrao Sardessai	Khabari (Essays)
1983		Damodar Mauzo	Karmelin (Novel)
1984		Pundalik Naik	Chowrang (One-act play)
1985		J. B. Moraes	Bhitorlem Tufan (Poetry)
1986		Prakash Damodar Padgaonkar	Hanv Monis Asvat-Thamo (Poetry)
1987		Arvind N. Mambro	Panaji Atam Mhatari Zalea (Short stories)
1988		Chandrakant Keni	Vhonkolpavnni (Short stories)
1989		C. F. D'Costa	Sonshyache Kan (Poetry)
1990		Ramesh Veluskar	Savul Gori (Poetry)
1991	—	Meena Kakodkar	Sapan Fulam (Short stories)
1992		Nagesh Karmali	Vanshakulachen Denen (Poetry)
1993		Mahabaleshwar Sail	Tarangan (Short stories)
1994		Gokuldas Prabhu	Antar ayami (Short stories)
1995		Dilip Borkar	Gomanchal Te Himachal (Travelogue)
1996		Shankar Ramani	Nilem Nilem Braham (Poetry)
1997	—	Sheela Kolambkar	Bhuim Chafim (Pen-portraits)
1998	—	John Baptist Sequeira	Ashim Asim Lharan (Poetry)
1999	—	Saratchandra Shenoi	Antarnad (Poetry)
2000		Pandurang Bhangui	Champhel'li Sanj (Poetry)
2001		Madhav Borkar	Yaman (Poetry)
2002		Hema Naik	Bhogadandd (Novel)
2003	—	(Late) Shashank Sitaram	Parigh (Short Stories)
2004		Jayanti Naik	Athang (Short Stories)
2005		N. Shivdas	Bhaangarsaall (Short Stories)
2006		Datta Damodar Naik	Jai Kai Jui? (Essays)
2007	—	Devidas Kadam	Dika (Novel)
2008	—	Ashok Kamat	Ghannaghai Niyatiche (Cruel blows of destiny).
2009		Jess Fernandes	Kirvontt (Collection of Poems)
2010	—	Arun Sakhardande	Kavlyanche Shradh (Collection of Poems)
2011		Melvyn Rodrigues	Prakriticho Paas (Collection of Poems)
2012	—	Kashinath Shamba Lolienkar	Kavyasutra (Poetry)
2013	—	Tukaram Rama Shet	Manmotayam (Essays)
2014		Madhavi Sardesai	Manthan (Essays)
2015		Uday Bhembre	Karna Parva (Play)
2016	—	Edwin J. F. D'Souza	Kallem Bhangar (Novel)
2017	—	Gajanan Jog	Khand Ani Her Katha (Short Stories)
2018		Paresh Narendra Kamat	Chitralipi (Poetry)
2019	—	Nilba A. Khandekar	The Words (Poetry)
2020	—	R. S. Bhaskar	Yugparivartancho Yatri (Collection of Poems)
2021		Sanjiv Verenkar	Raktachandan (Poetry)
2022	—	Maya Anil Kharangate	Amrutvel (Novel)
2023		Prakash Parienkar	Varsal (Short Stories)
2024	—	Mukesh Thali	Rangtarang (Essays)
2025	—	Henry Mendonca (H. M. Pernal)	Konkani Kavyem: Rupani Ani Rupakam (Essays)
