= Madhav Borkar =

Indian poet and litterateur (born 1954)

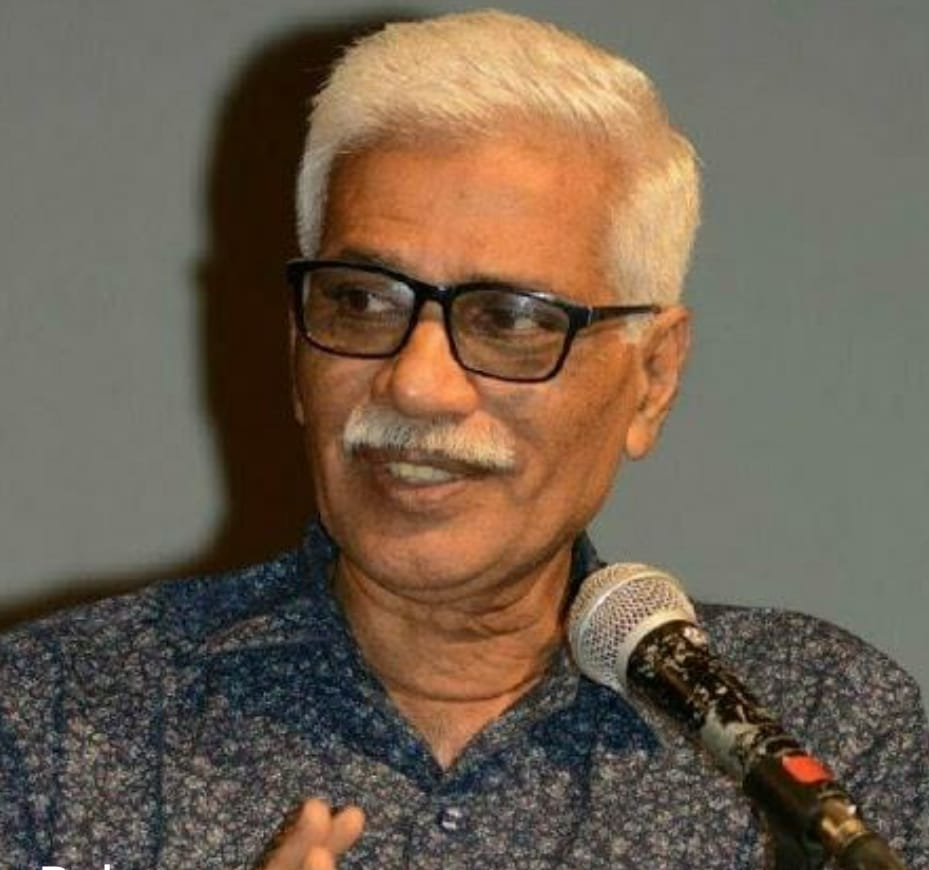
- Borkar in 2018
- Born: Madhav Borkar; 4 June 1954 (age 72); Goa, Portuguese India
- Education: People's High School, Panjim

Madhav Borkar (also Borcar, in Konkani) is an Indian Konkani poet, former station director of All India Radio and Konkani litterateur.

== Career ==
Borkar was earlier station director of All India Radio, Panaji (Panjim). As a broadcaster, he has also worked in the government-run radio stations at Mumbai, Mangalore and Kolhapur.

In 2015, Borkar replaced Pundalik Naik as the president of the Goa Konkani Akademi. In March 2018, he completed 50 years in poetry, and has published eight volumes of verse. He is married to Mankarnika and they have two children, daughter Yogini and son Chinmay.

== Works ==
Borkar wrote poetry since 1968. His first collection was published while he was still a schoolboy. At the age of 15, his Chanvar got into print. He has six collections of poems and two translations -- Kabir by Prabhakar Machve and Ekshem Ek Kavita by Rabindranath Tagore.

=== His poetic works ===
- Chanvar (The Bloom, 1969)
- Vatacheo Savalleo (The Shadows of Sunlight, 1972),
- Uzvadacho Rookh (The Tree of Light, 1975),
- Parjallachem Daar (The Door to Brightness, 1986)
- Yaman (Yaman, 1999),
- Avyaktaachim Gaannim (Songs of the Unexpressed, 2002)
- Symphony (Symphony, 2012)
- Molabachem Zonel
- Sukrutfulam (Sanjana, 2024)

== Awards ==
Earlier in his writing career, he received the Indian Sahitya Akademi Award in 2001 for Yaman, a poetry collection.

== Critical response ==
Nandkumar Kamat describes Borkar as being part of the "second generation" of post-(Indian) Independence Konkani poets along with Nagesh Karmali, Shankar Parulkar, Pundalik Naik, Ramesh Veluskar, C. F. D'Costa, Olivinho Gomes, Suresh Borkar, Jess Fernandes, Prakash Padgaonkar, Kashinath Shamba Lolienkar and Ramkrishna Zuarkar. In Kamat's listing, he names B. B. Borkar, Manoharrai Sardessai, Abhijit and R.V. Pandit as the post-Independence poets in Konkani who "made major contributions whereas Pandurang Bhangi, Shankar Ramani, Shankar Bhandari and Vijaya Sarmalkar began to publish their poems."

Manohar Rai Sardesai calls his work "terse, abstract yet appealing".
