= Nagesh Karmali =

Indian writer (1933–2023)

Nagesh Ramdas Karmali
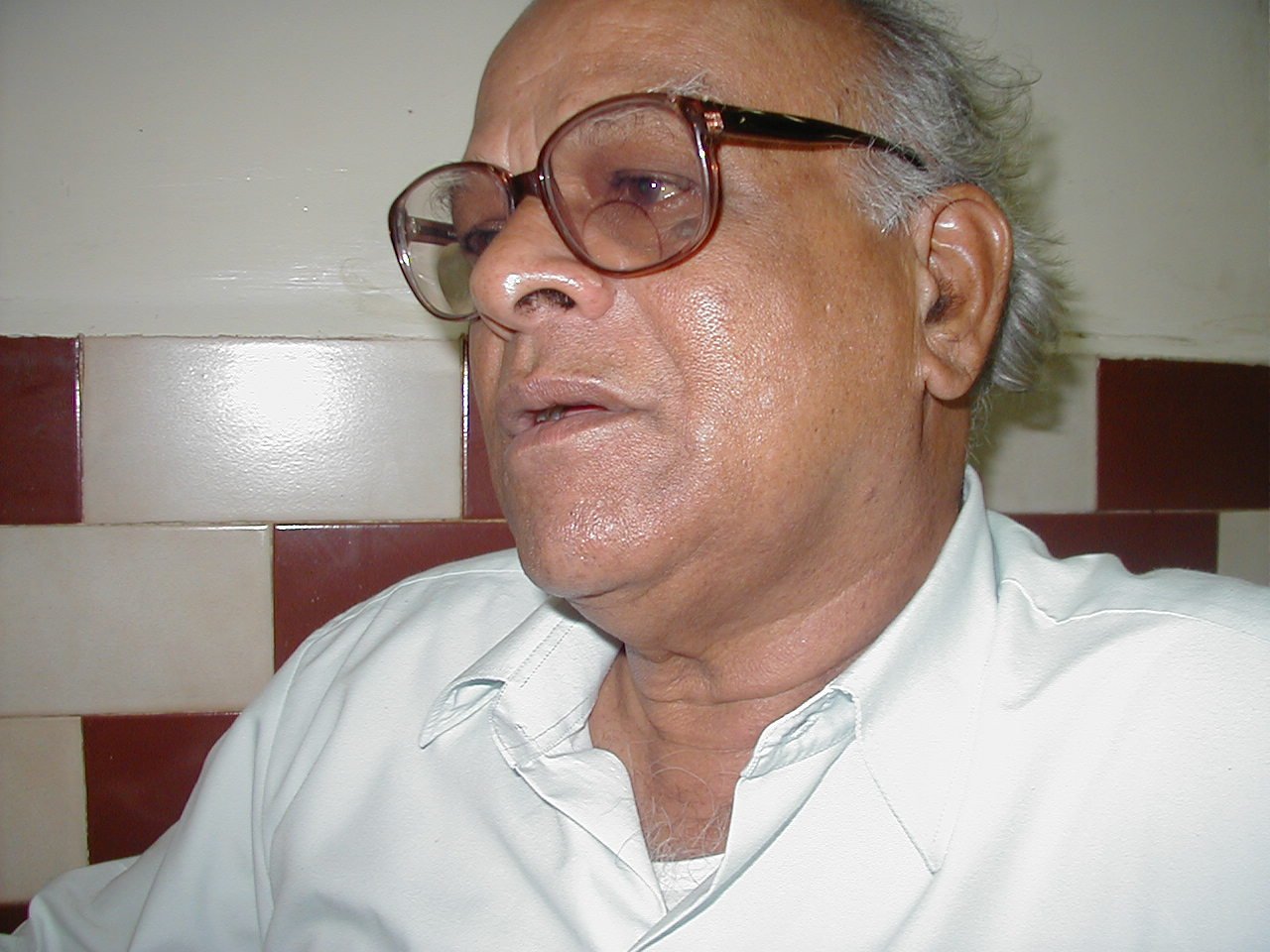
- Born: 5 February 1933; Kakoda, Quepem taluka, Portuguese India
- Died: 9 February 2023 (aged 90); Panaji, Goa, India
- Occupations: Poet, writer, freedom fighter
- Writing career
- Genres: Poetry, plays
- Notable work: Jot, Zonvar, Vamshkullache Dene
- Notable awards: Sahitya Akademi Award (1992)
- Literary movement: Goa liberation movement

Nagesh Ramdas Karmali (5 February 1933 – 9 February 2023) was an Indian freedom fighter, poet, and writer from Goa. He was a prominent figure in the Goa liberation movement and is recognized for his literary contributions to the Konkani language, for which he received the Sahitya Akademi Award.

== Early life and education ==
Karmali was born on 5 February 1933 in Kakoda, Quepem taluka, Portuguese Goa. His father was Ramdas Madhav Nayak Karmali. He received his primary education in Marathi and Portuguese. He developed a keen interest in literature during his childhood, influenced by the works of B. B. Borkar, who was also his teacher in primary school.

== Goa Liberation Movement and activism ==
Karmali became actively involved in the struggle for Goa's independence from Portuguese rule. In 1952, he joined the Goa Vimochan Sahayak Samiti and participated in the Satyagraha movement in Goa. He was associated with the National Congress (Goa) and worked to spread nationalist sentiment in southern Goa under the guidance of Anthony D'Souza.

On 16 September 1954, he entered Goa via the Terekhol border without a visa as part of a protest. He was arrested by the Portuguese police and sentenced to ten years of imprisonment by a military court. During his incarceration at Reis Magos and Aguada forts, he continued his literary pursuits and studied the history of freedom struggles. He was released in 1959 after serving approximately four and a half years of his sentence. Following his release, he continued to work underground for the liberation of Goa until 1961.

Following the liberation, Karmali participated in the Goa Opinion Poll of 1967, advocating against the merger of Goa with Maharashtra. He later served as the president of the Goa Freedom Fighters Association.

== Career and literary work ==
After the Liberation of Goa, Karmali worked as a 'Staff Artist' at the All India Radio (AIR) station in Panaji from 1966 until his retirement in 1991. He was also involved in the labour movement in 1962.

As a writer, Karmali contributed significantly to Konkani literature. His notable poetry collections include Jot (1979), Zonvar (1979), and Vamshkullache Dene (1981). In 1992, he was awarded the Sahitya Akademi Award for his collection Vamshkullache Dene. He also adapted plays such as Kelu Janmejaya by Sriranga and Adhe Adhure by Mohan Rakesh into Konkani. He served in various capacities within the Konkani Bhasha Mandal, was a member of the Goa Konkani Akademi, and presided over the 13th Konkani Sahitya Parishad. Additionally, he worked on the editorial board of the Goa Gazetteer and the biography project for Goan freedom fighters.

== Death ==
Karmali died on 9 February 2023 at his home in Panaji, Goa, at the age of 90.

== Awards and recognition ==
Karmali's literary work has been recognized with several honors:

- Sahitya Akademi Award in Konkani (1992) for Vamshkullache Dene.
- Goa State Award for literature.
- State Sahitya Award from the Konkani Bhasha Mandal and the Goa Kala Academy for his collection Jot.
- Tamrapatra from the Government of India in 1972 for his role as a freedom fighter.
