= Dilip Borkar =

Indian writer (born 1956)

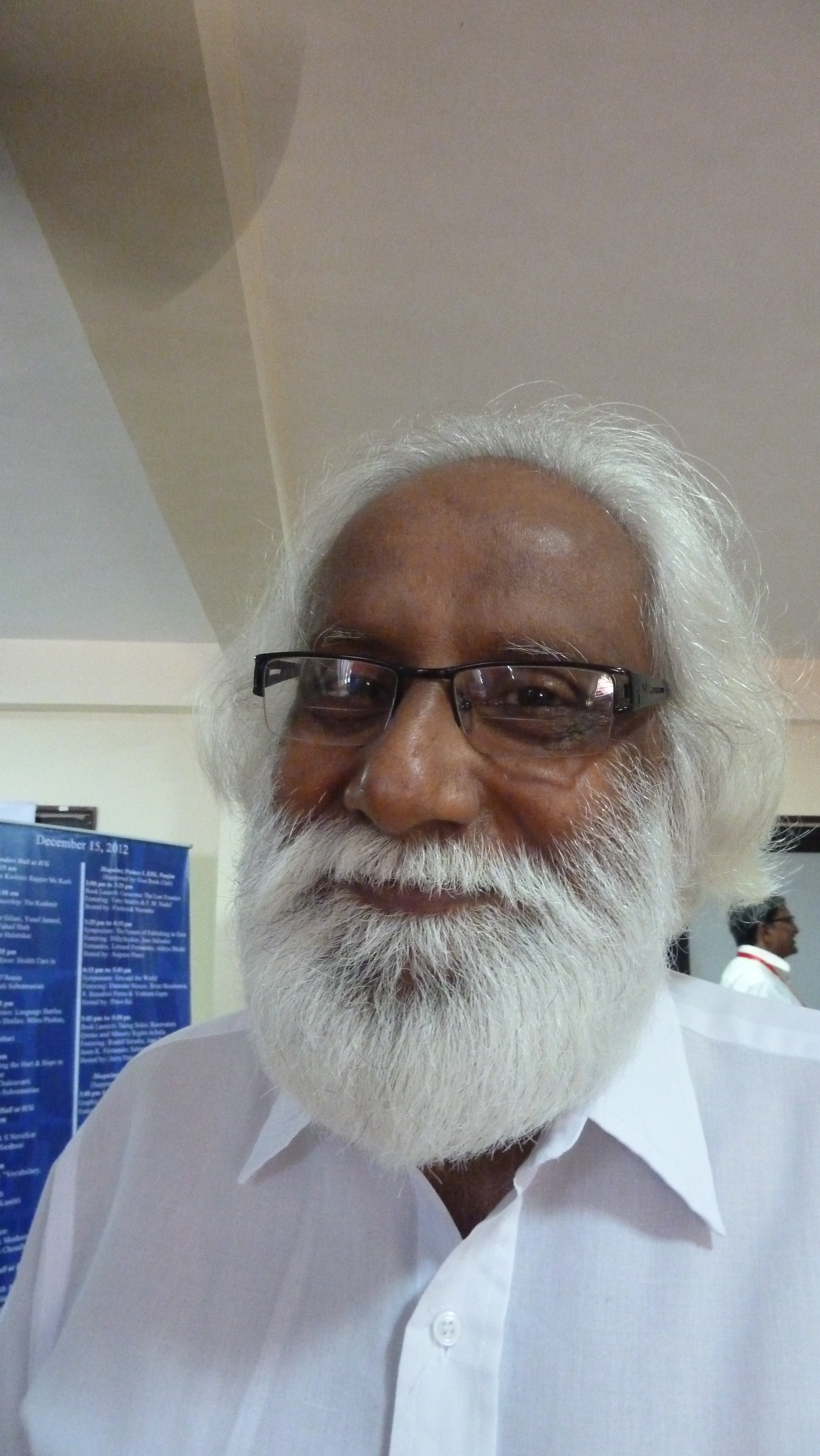
- Borkar in 2012
- Born: 9 January 1956 (age 70); Agaçaim, Goa, Portuguese India
- Writing career
- Notable work: Gomanchal te Himachal
- Notable awards: Sahitya Akademi Award (1995)

Dilip Borkar (born 9 January 1956) is an Indian writer, dramatist, and essayist known for his contributions to Konkani literature. He has also been active in social, youth, and linguistic movements in Goa.

== Early life and education ==
Dilip Borkar was born in Agaçaim, Goa, on 9 January 1956. In 1980, he completed his Bachelor of Arts (B.A.). He later completed a Master of Arts (M.A.) degree in Hindi. Later, in 1990, he obtained a Master of Arts (M.A.) degree in Hindi and Konkani. He has also taught Konkani at the college level.

== Literary career ==
Borkar has written extensively across multiple literary genres including drama, plays, children’s stories, essays, travel writing, and novels. His works often explore themes of Goan identity, social change, and the human condition.

=== Selected works ===
- Dramas: Vargshatru, Bhartebhar, Antichi Gadi, Majach Maja, Aaj Amache Rajya Ayela (street play), Cancer
- Radio and Nabhonatya plays: Eka Talache Talake, Ujvacho Chode Ek Zero Journey
- Children’s stories: Darya Sundari, Ashant Sushant, Mastya Gunduchi Nasti
- Essays: Rough Questions, Sakhi
- Novels: Pavitr Karar (translation), Babluchi Patre (a Marathi novel in letter form)
- Travel writing: Gomanchal to Himachal

== Awards and recognition ==
Borkar has received several awards for his literary contributions:

- Kala Academy Award for Bhartebhar (1982)
- Kala Academy Award for Gomanchal te Himachal (1985)
- Aakashvani Award for Eka Talache Talake (1987)
- Kala Academy Award for Ujvadacho Doot (1987)
- Konkani Bhasha Mandal Award (1991)
- Kala Academy Award for Ek Shunya Pravas (1992)
- Sahitya Akademi Award for Gomanchal te Himachal (1995)

== Public life ==
From his student days, Borkar has been actively involved in the political, social, and youth movements of Goa. He continues to engage with initiatives promoting the Konkani language and its literature.

== See also ==
- Konkani literature
- List of Sahitya Akademi Award winners for Konkani
