= Mukesh Thali =

Indian writer (born 1963)

- Born: 1963 (age 62–63)
- Occupation: Writer, translator, lexicographer, broadcaster
- Language: Konkani, Marathi, English, Hindi
- Genre: Essays, plays, translations
- Notable works: Rangtarang, Hansdhwani, Do re ma fa – Sa re ni sa
- Notable awards: Sahitya Akademi Award (2024)

Mukesh Thali (born 1963) is an Indian writer, translator, and former broadcaster from Goa. He is best known for his contributions to Konkani literature, for which he was awarded the Sahitya Akademi Award in 2024.

== Career ==
Thali began his career as a research assistant at Goa University, where he worked for six years in the Department of Konkani Encyclopedia. In 1993, he joined All India Radio (AIR) at the Panaji station, serving as a news reader and translator for over 30 years before retiring in 2023. He became a well-known voice in Konkani broadcasting, noted for his unique style of news presentation.

== Literary work ==
Thali is a prolific writer in Konkani and has also written in Marathi, English, and Hindi. His literary repertoire includes several collections of essays, such as Velsar, Hansdhwani, Jeevangandh, Aksharbrahm, and Shivranjani. His 2019 book, Rangtarang (also written as Ranga Tarang), is a collection of essays and pen-portraits focusing on 25 personalities from the field of performing arts and theater.

As a playwright, he wrote Do re ma fa – Sa re ni sa (also cited as Doremifa and Sarenisa), which earned recognition at the Goa Kala Academy's Konkani Drama Competition. Thali is also a prominent translator, having translated approximately 60 fictional works into Konkani. In the field of lexicography, he co-authored a Konkani-English dictionary.

== Personal life and influences ==
A resident of Panaji, Thali spent his childhood in the village of Priol, where he was groomed by the Jnanpith Award-winning writer Ravindra Kelekar. During his youth, he was exposed to literary stalwarts such as B. B. Borkar and Manohar Rai Sardesai. His family background also influenced his artistic interests; his grandfather was a noted percussionist and stage actor.

== Awards and recognition ==
- Sahitya Akademi Award in Konkani (2024) for his essay collection Rangtarang.
- Goa Konkani Akademi State Award for his book Hansdhwani.
- Goa Kala Academy State Award.
