= Arun Sakhardande =

Indian writer (born 1948)

- Born: 8 September 1948 (age 77); Sakhali, Goa, India
- Education: M.Com, LL.B, H.D.C., Pandit H.S.S.
- Occupations: Poet, academic, writer
- Years active: 1966–present
- Known for: Kavlyachem Sraddha (poetry collection)
- Awards: Sahitya Akademi Award (2010)

Arun Sakhardande (born 8 September 1948) is an Indian poet and academic from Goa, known for his contributions to Konkani literature. He received the Sahitya Akademi Award in 2010 for his poetry anthology Kavlyachem Sraddha.

== Early life and education ==
Sakhardande was born on 8 September 1948 in Sakhali, Goa. He completed a Master of Commerce (M.Com), a Bachelor of Laws (LL.B), and a Higher Diploma in Co-operation (H.D.C.). He also holds a Pandit H.S.S. (Senior) qualification.

== Career ==
=== Literary career ===
Sakhardande began writing poetry and short stories in Konkani in 1966.

As of 2022, he was the president of the Goa Konkani Akademi.

Sakhardande was part of the Konkani language agitation. In 2015, he was part of a protest by Sahitya Akademi Award winners against the killings of writers and rationalists across India.

=== Political career ===
In January 2024, Sakhardande joined the Bharatiya Janata Party.

== Notable works ==
- Eka Zadak Ghar Zai (1989)
- Kavlyachem Sraddha (2007) – This collection was the recipient of the Sahitya Akademi Award.
- Mog Kinari (2008)

== Awards and honours ==
- Sahitya Akademi Award (2010): Awarded for his book Kavlyachem Sraddha.
- Konkani Bhasha Mandal Sahitya Puraskar (2008): For Kavlyachem Sraddha.
- Janaganga Sahitya Puraskar (2008): For Kavlyachem Sraddha.
- Bharat Vidya Shiromani Award: Recognized for outstanding achievements in the field of education.
