= Prakash Padgaonkar =

Indian poet (1948–2021)

Prakash Damodar Padgaonkar
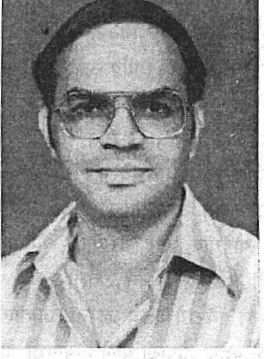
- Born: 4 December 1948; Bombay, India
- Died: 29 April 2021 (aged 72)
- Occupations: Poet, administrator
- Spouse: Sanjeevi
- Children: 4
- Writing career
- Language: Konkani, Marathi
- Notable work: Hanv Monis Ashwatthamo; Uzvaddachim Pavlam; Vascoyan
- Notable awards: Sahitya Akademi Award (1986); Dr. T.M.A. Pai Foundation Best Book Award (2005); Rajya Sanman (2007)

Prakash Damodar Padgaonkar (4 December 1948 – 29 April 2021) was an Indian poet known for his works in the Konkani language. He also wrote poetry in Marathi. He was a recipient of the Sahitya Akademi Award in Konkani.

== Early life and education ==
Padgaonkar was born on 4 December 1948 in Bombay, India. His parents were Damodar and Vijaya. He was raised in a Dalit family and faced poverty and significant hardships during his childhood.

He completed his schooling through the Marathi medium at the Mushtifund School in Panaji, and through the Portuguese medium at the Masanu de Amorin School. He later pursued higher education by attending evening classes at the Dhempe College of Arts and Science. He held a Bachelor of Arts (Honours) degree.

== Career ==
Padgaonkar worked in the administrative department of the All India Radio (AIR) center in Panaji from 1968 to 1974. Later, he served as a manager for MMTC Ltd in the city of Vasco da Gama. He was also a former member of the Advisory Committee of AIR Panaji.

In the literary sphere, Padgaonkar served as the President of the Konkani Lekhak Sangh Goa. In 2003, he headed the Reception Committee of the 16th All India Konkani Literary Conference. Later, he was elected to preside over the 22nd All India Konkani Sahitya Sammelan held in Kozhikode, Kerala, in February 2015.

== Literary work ==
Padgaonkar was an active poet for over four decades. His poetry is noted for its restrained emotion, use of symbolism and imagery, and the exploration of eternal life values. His work was the subject of doctoral research by Dr. Chandralekha D'Souza at Goa University.

He published several collections of poetry, including:

- Uzvaddachim Pavlam (Steps of Light) (1976)
- Vascoyan (1977)
- Hanv Monis Ashwatthamo (I am Man Ashvatthamo) (1985)
- Kavita: Kaal- relvecho, mon harshancho, pavsa-panyancho (1993)
- Sorg ghodpak dhortorencho (1994)
- Vhaunti nhai kallachi (2003)
- Brahmand- yogi chirantanacho (2008)
- Punararthopnishad (2014)

His works have been translated into English and various other Indian languages. He cited the senior poet Bakibab Borkar as a mentor and noted the philosophical influence of Shri Arvind on his personal development.

== Awards and honors ==
Padgaonkar's literary contributions were recognized with various awards:

- 1986: Sahitya Akademi Award for his collection Hanv Monis Ashwatthamo.
- 2005: Dr. T.M.A. Pai Foundation Best Book Award for Vhaunti Nhai Kallachi.
- 2007: Goa State Reward 'Rajya Sanman' for Cultural Excellence.
- 2009–10: State Cultural Award for Cultural Excellence in the Field of Literature.

He also received State Awards from the Kala Academy and the Konkani Bhasha Mandal (Goa) for his works Uzvaddachim Pavlam and Vascoyan.

== Personal life and death ==
He was married to Sanjeevi. The couple had four children: three daughters and one son.

Padgaonkar died on 29 April 2021 due to COVID-19.
