= Nilba Khandekar =

Indian writer

Nilba A. Khandekar
- Born: Navelim, Goa, India
- Occupations: Poet, playwright
- Employer: Indian Navy (retired)
- Writing career
- Language: Konkani
- Years active: 1974–present
- Notable work: The Words (poetry collection)
- Notable awards: Sahitya Akademi Award (2019)

Nilba A. Khandekar is an Indian poet and playwright from Goa who writes in the Konkani language. In 2019, he was awarded the Sahitya Akademi Award, India's highest literary honour, for his poetry collection titled The Words.

== Early life and career ==
Khandekar is based in Navelim, Goa. He served as an upper-division clerk in the defense department of the Indian Navy at Vasco, retiring in March 2019 after 36 years of service. Following his retirement, he dedicated himself to full-time reading and writing.

He has published seven books. His first book, Vedh, was released in 1992. In 2016, he published an anthology of plays titled The Peace before Storm.

== Literary style and themes ==
His award-winning collection, The Words, includes notable poems such as Unknown Sky, a poem centered on nature and the exploitation of its resources, and Words, the titular poem which is about the literary heritage of old texts that have been passed down the generations.

== Awards and recognition ==
- Sahitya Akademi Award (2019): Awarded for his book of poems, The Words.
- Kala Academy Award (2013): Conferred for his work Dandkaranya.
- Konkani Bhasha Mandal Awards: Received for his books Suryawanshi (2000) and Agni (2003).
