= Sanjiv Verenkar =

Indian poet (1959–2023)

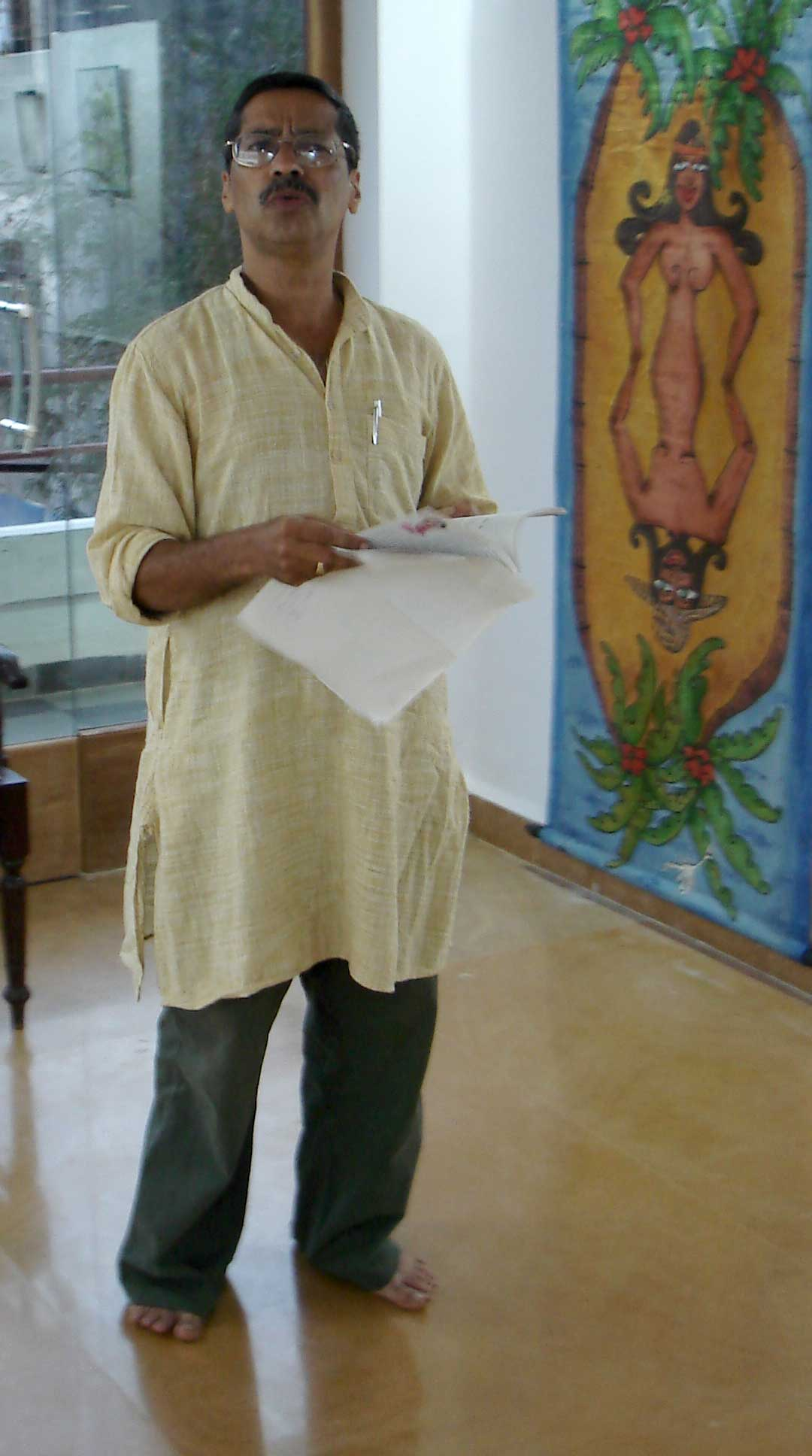
- Verenkar in 2014
- Born: 1959; Savoi-Verem, Goa, India
- Died: 18 March 2023 (aged 63–64); Goa, India
- Occupations: Poet, journalist
- Children: 2
- Writing career
- Language: Konkani, Marathi
- Notable work: Raktachandan (poetry collection)
- Notable awards: Sahitya Akademi Award (2021)

Sanjiv Verenkar (1959 – 18 March 2023) was an Indian poet and journalist known for his contributions to Konkani literature. He was a recipient of the Sahitya Akademi Award for his poetry collection Raktachandan.

== Early life and education ==
Verenkar was born in 1959 in the village of Savoi-Verem in Ponda taluka, Goa.

== Career ==
=== Journalism ===
Verenkar had a career in journalism lasting approximately 35 years. He was associated with several prominent publications in Goa, including the Marathi daily Tarun Bharat and the Konkani daily Sunaparant.

=== Literature ===
Verenlar started his literary career in 1978. Throughout his literary career, he authored authored 17 books, nine of which are poetry collections.

His poetry anthology Raktachandan won him the Sahitya Akademi Award in 2021.

== Awards and honors ==
- Sahitya Akademi Award (2021) for Raktachandan.
- Goa State Cultural Award.
- Konkani Bhasha Mandal Award.
- Dr. T. M. A. Pai Foundation Award.

== Death ==
Verenkar died on 18 March 2023 at the age of 64, following a brief illness. He had a wife and two daughters.
