= Sheela Kolambkar =

Indian writer (born 1945)

- Born: Sheela Naik; 11 March 1945 (age 81)
- Occupation: Writer, translator, teacher
- Education: BA (Hons), Bombay University
- Genre: Short story, essay, character sketches, children's literature, travelogue
- Notable works: Oli Saanj, Bhuim Chanfim, Guerra
- Notable awards: Sahitya Akademi Award (1997); Sahitya Akademi Translation Prize (2007)
- Spouse: Tukaram Kolambkar

Sheela Kolambkar (born Sheela Naik; 11 March 1945) is an Indian writer and translator predominantly known for her work in the Konkani language. She is a recipient of the Sahitya Akademi Award and has been a significant figure in modern Konkani literature since her debut in the early 1970s.

== Early life and education ==
Sheela Kolambkar was born on 11 March 1945. She completed her schooling and higher education in Panaji, Goa, graduating with a BA (Hons) from Bombay University in 1965. During her college years, she was inspired by her professor, S. Nadkarni, and the noted scholar and Jnanpith Award winner Ravindra Kelekar. She discovered that writing in Konkani was the most effective way for her to express her creative feelings.

== Literary career ==
Kolambkar's literary career began with her maiden short story, Guerra (War), which won first prize in a contest held by the daily Rashtramat. This story is considered a trendsetter in modern Konkani literature. It was later translated into English by Prakash Thali and Santan Rodrigues for Femina (1974), and into Portuguese by Noronha.

In 1973, her first collection of short stories, Oli Saanj, was published by Jaag Prakashan. The collection received critical acclaim, with writer Laxmanrao Sardesai praising its artistic rendition of life experiences. Her story Haum Vanzudnhai was adapted into a telefilm by Mukesh Thali, winning an award in Doordarshan's national level regional language category.

Kolambkar is also recognized for her work in the genre of character sketches. Her book Bhuim Chanfim features fictitious character portraits, while her more recent work, Sheela Lekh, portrays real-life personalities, including members of her own family.

She has also written extensively for children, a skill she developed while narrating stories to her two sons. Her bibliography includes several children's books such as Tejas ani Ojas and Kavlya kakya re.

Her writing is noted for its linguistic diversity; while she writes primarily in the Devanagari script, her works have also been published in the Roman script to reach a wider audience across the Konkani-speaking diaspora.

== Translations ==
Beyond her original writing, Kolambkar is an active translator. She translated a collection of Dogri short stories into Konkani under the title Bhangrachem Suknnem, for which she received the Sahitya Akademi Translation Prize. Her other translation works include Dongravelo Uzo (from English) and Parjallti Gholl.

== Personal life ==
Kolambkar served as an assistant teacher in Agaçaim and Santa Cruz, Goa, between 1966 and 1972. Following her marriage to Tukaram Kolambkar, she moved to Mumbai, where she has lived for over 42 years. Despite living outside Goa, she has maintained a consistent and pure Konkani style in her writing.

== Awards and accolades ==
She has been awarded and honoured with many accolades:

- Kala Academy Goa State Award for Oli Saanj (1975)
- Sahitya Akademi Award for Bhuim Chanfim (1997)
- President of the 14th Akhil Bharatiya Konkani Sahitya Sammelan (1998)
- Sahitya Akademi Translation Prize for Bhangrachem Suknnem (2007)
- Sahitya Akademi Samsung Tagore Literature Award for literary excellence (2012)
- Vimla V. Pai Vishwa Konkani Sahitya Puraskar (2014)

== Works ==
Some of her popular works are listed below:

=== Short story collections ===
- Oli Saanj (1973)
- Guerra (2007)

=== Essays and character sketches ===
- Bhuim-chanfim (1994)
- Sheelalekh (2012)

=== Children's literature ===
- Tejas ani Ojas (1996)
- Pankaj (2005)
- Kavlya kakya re (2012)
