= Devidas =

Devidas is a middle name and given name. Notable people with the name include:

- Devidas Anandrao Pingale
- Devidas Kadam
- Devidas Stagniunas
- Murlidhar Devidas Amte
