= Arvind N. Mambro =

Indian writer (born 1938)

Arvind Narayan Mambro
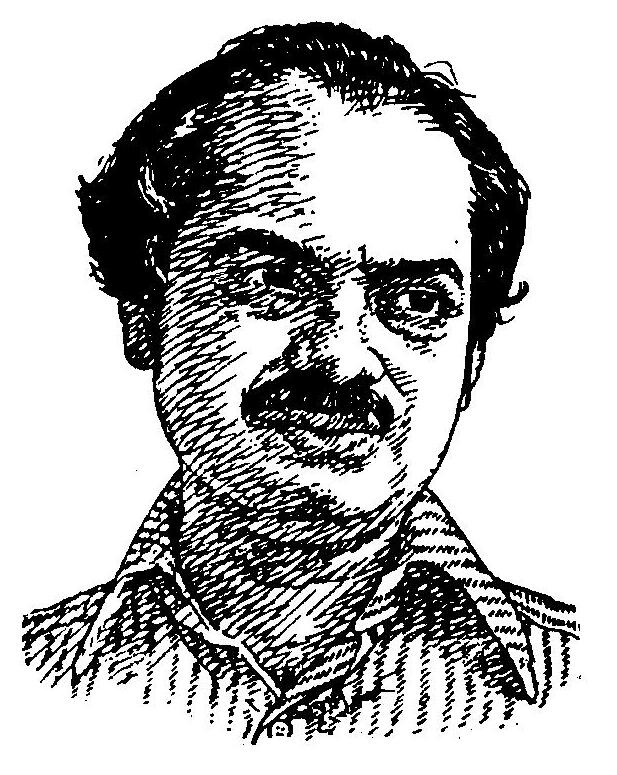
- Born: 4 October 1938 (age 88); Ribandar, Portuguese Goa
- Occupations: Writer, literary critic
- Writing career
- Pen name: Ana Mambro
- Language: Konkani
- Notable work: Panaji Aatam Mhatari Jaalea
- Notable awards: Sahitya Akademi Award

Arvind Narayan Mambro (born 4 October 1938), widely known by the name Ana Mambro, is an Indian writer, archivist, and economist. He writes in Konkani, Marathi, and English, and is known for his contributions to Konkani literature, including poetry, light essays, radio plays, and translations. He is noted for his unconventional writing style, which incorporates new themes and techniques that depart from traditional short-story models. His work often reflects the socio-political and cultural shifts in Goa following its liberation in 1961.

== Early life and education ==
Mambro was born on 4 October 1938 in Ribandar, Portuguese Goa. He completed his primary education in Ribandar and underwent secondary schooling in Vasco and Panaji. He then pursued his collegiate education in Belgaum and Mumbai.

In 1964, Mambro earned a Master of Arts degree in philosophy from the University of Mumbai. He subsequently completed studies in archaeology at the National Archives of India in New Delhi as well as at the University of London.

== Career ==
From 1963 to 1965, Mambro worked as a staff artist at the Mumbai station of Akashvani. He subsequently served as a lecturer at Kirti College in Mumbai between 1965 and 1967. He then worked in journalism from 1967 to 1970.

In 1970, Mambro joined Tata Economic Consultancy Services, where he served in roles as a research assistant, junior economist, and economist consultant until 1987. Between 1988 and 1990, he engaged in research related to the biography of J. R. D. Tata. In 1990, he became the Principal Archival Officer at the Tata Central Archives.

Mambro has also served as a committee member for the Goa Konkani Akademi and the Sahitya Akademi.

== Literary career ==
Mambro started writing around the age of 13 or 14. During his college years, a number of plays written by him were staged. His writings have appeared across periodicals, radio broadcasts, and published books.

His debut published Konkani book, Ghumche Katar Ghumadd (1964), is a collection of instructional poems for children. His second book, Goanchi Asmitai, is a collection of light essays portraying Goan culture. His third book, Panaji Attam Mhatari Jalya, earned him national recognition.

Mambro has served as an editor for notable works, including Prasadaphool and Swatantra Goantli Konkani Katha. He translated a French play by Eugène Ionesco into Konkani under the title Gajalichen Natak. He also authored several one-act plays for Akashvani, such as Ghar Nashillo Gharkar, Tya Disachi Ek Gajali, and Maratlo Gharchyank Olakhna.

Mambro's literary work includes poetry, drama, and short stories. His early published works include Ghumche Katar, a collection of verse for children; Goemchi Asmitay, a book focused on the land and people of Goa; and Gajalichem Natak, a Konkani adaptation of a French play by Eugène Ionesco.

In addition to his books, Mambro has published numerous essays in various Konkani journals and is known for his work in perceptive literary criticism.

He gained significant literary attention in 1969 with the publication of the story Gavet Uktem Jaina, which was noted for the novelty of its theme and brilliance of expression. This work established him as a trend-setter in modern Konkani short stories.

== Writing style and themes ==
Mambro's writing is characterized by its "freshness of expression" and a "charming style." His prose often uses very short sentences, sometimes reading like logical propositions, an influence he attributes to his studies in philosophy.

His stories frequently explore:

- Post-Liberation Nostalgia: Many of his characters experience a deep nostalgia for the Portuguese era and find it difficult to adjust to the changes in Goan life after 1961.
- Social Satire: He employs subtle irony and powerful satire to portray various social figures, including politicians and merchants.
- Cultural Critique: His work addresses contemporary issues such as the impact of tourism on Goa.
- Literary Allusions: Mambro is noted as one of the few Konkani writers to effectively use social, political, and literary allusions in his narratives.

His attention to minute detail has been compared to that of the German writer Günter Grass.

== Notable work ==
Mambro's most prominent work is his first short story collection, Panaji Aatam Mhatari Jaalea (1985), published by Kulagar Prakashan. The collection features sixteen stories that record the changing life of Goa in "minute detail." The work was hailed as a landmark in contemporary Konkani literature for its social content and innovative technique.

== Awards and recognition ==
Mambro was honoured with the Sahitya Akademi Award for his collection Panaji Aatam Mhatari Jaalea. The award citation praised the work for its "social content, freshness of expression and charming style."

He has won the Goa Kala Academy Award in 1964, for Ghumche Katar Ghumadd. He has also won the Konkani Bhasha Mandal (Goa) Award and the Government of Maharashtra Award.
