= Tukaram Rama Shet =

Indian writer (born 1952)

- Born: 31 July 1952 (age 74); Volvoi, Goa, India
- Education: B.A. (Economics), M.A. (Marathi)
- Occupations: Writer, poet, editor
- Spouse: Hira Phadte
- Writing career
- Language: Konkani
- Genres: Novel, poetry, essays, children's literature
- Notable works: Pakhlo, Manmotayam, Jaann
- Notable awards: Sahitya Akademi Award (2013); Bal Sahitya Puraskar (2023)

Tukaram Rama Shet (born 31 July 1952) is an Indian writer, poet, and editor from Goa who primarily writes in the Konkani language. He is recognized for his contributions to Konkani literature, particularly in the fields of children's literature, essays, and fiction. Shet is a recipient of the Sahitya Akademi Award and the Bal Sahitya Puraskar.

== Early life and education ==
Shet was born on 31 July 1952 in the village of Volvoi in North Goa. Coming from a humble background, his family prioritized education, leading him to move to Betim, near Panaji, to pursue higher studies. He completed a Bachelor of Arts in economics and subsequently obtained a Master of Arts in Marathi literature.

== Career ==
Shet began his professional career in 1976 with the Telecom Department in Goa, where he served until his retirement in 1998. Alongside his professional work, he was deeply involved in the Konkani language movement, particularly during the struggle for the official language status of Konkani in the mid-1980s.

He held several administrative and executive roles in various cultural and literary organizations, including the Konkani Bhasha Mandal and the Goa Konkani Academy. In 2001, he served as the executive chairman of the 15th All India Konkani Literary Conference held in Porvorim.

=== Literary work ===
Shet’s literary career began in the early 1970s with poems and one-act plays broadcast on All India Radio, Panaji. His 1978 novel, Pakhlo, is considered a milestone in modern Konkani literature, exploring psychological and social themes through the life of a protagonist born of a Portuguese soldier and an Indian woman. The novel has been translated into several Indian languages, including Hindi, Punjabi, and Maithili.

As an editor, he published the literary magazine Shabdul in 1978 and founded Konkan Times, a publication he edited for over three decades. His essay collection, Manmotayam, and his poetry collection, Karunayan—which reflects on the COVID-19 pandemic—are among his notable later works.

=== Children's literature and education ===
Shet is known for his extensive work in children's literature and the revival of traditional Konkani folk songs. In 1987, he founded Balgeet Niketan, an organization dedicated to producing literary and educational resources for children, including audio cassettes and CDs. He also authored the award-winning children's novel Jaann (2017), which focuses on the relationship between children and nature.

== Awards and honors ==
Shet has received numerous accolades for his literary contributions:

- Kala Academy Goa State Literary Award (1981, 2008)
- Sahitya Akademi Award for Manmotayam (2013)
- G.S. Amonkar Excellence Award (2010)
- Sahitya Akademi Bal Sahitya Puraskar for Jaann (2023)
- Goa State Cultural Award for Literature (2023–24)

== Bibliography ==
Some of his works include:

- Pakhalo (Novel, 1978)
- Dhartarecho Sparsh (Short stories, 2007)
- Manmotyam (Essays, 2009)
- Jaann (Children's novel, 2017)
- Karunayan (Poetry, 2021)
- Chitpak Phulaam (Essays, 2023)
