= Meena Kakodkar =

Indian writer (1944–2024)

- Born: 21 September 1944; Palolem, Canacona, Goa
- Died: 8 November 2024 (aged 80); Margao, Goa
- Education: Wilson College, Mumbai
- Occupations: Writer; Civil servant
- Notable work: Sapan Phulam (1990); Savlyan Rego (2016)
- Spouse: Suresh Kakodkar
- Children: 2
- Awards: Sahitya Akademi Award (1991); Sahitya Akademi Translation Prize (2016)

Meena Suresh Kakodkar (21 September 1944 – 8 November 2024) was an Indian writer in the Konkani language and a civil servant. She was the first woman to receive the Sahitya Akademi Award for Konkani literature, which she won in 1991 for her short story collection Sapan Phulam.

== Early life and education ==
Kakodkar was born on 21 September 1944 in Palolem, Canacona, into the Gaitonde family. She pursued her higher education in Mumbai, graduating with a Bachelor of Science (B.Sc.) degree from Wilson College, Mumbai. She also had a keen interest in painting and completed a two-year special training course in the art form in Mumbai.

== Career ==
=== Civil service ===
Professionally, Kakodkar worked for the Government of Goa. She served in the Directorate of Accounts and eventually retired as a Joint Director.

=== Literary work ===
Kakodkar began publishing her literary work around 1967–1968. She is credited with bringing a "new dimension" to the art of short story writing in Konkani. Her first collection of short stories, Dongar Chanvalla, was published in 1972. This collection was later included in the academic curriculum for the 12th standard by the Goa Board and for the first year of the Bachelor of Arts program at Goa University.

Her second collection, Sapan Phulam (1990), won the Sahitya Akademi Award in 1991, making her the first woman to achieve this honour for a Konkani work. In 2016, she was awarded the Sahitya Akademi Translation Prize for Savlyan Rego, her Konkani translation of Amitav Ghosh's novel The Shadow Lines.

Her body of work includes three collections of short stories, one collection of essays, two novels, and literature for children, including a book of moral stories and a collection of plays. Her stories have been translated into several languages, including English, Kannada, and Malayalam.

=== Other activities ===
Kakodkar was also involved in theater and social activism. She won the first prize for Best Female Actor in drama competitions organized by the Kala Academy in 1980 and 1981. A lover of animals, she served as a trustee of the Goa Animal Welfare Trust.

== Personal life and death ==
She was married to Suresh Kakodkar. The couple had two sons, Mangurish and Yogesh.

Kakodkar died in Margao on 8 November 2024, following a brief illness. She was 80 years old. Her final rites were performed at the Hindu crematorium in Margao.

== Awards ==
- Sahitya Akademi Award (1991) for Sapan Phulam
- Sahitya Akademi Translation Prize (2016) for Savlyan Rego
- Konkani Bhasha Mandal Award (1977)
- Kala Academy Award
- Narsinha Damodar Naik Award (1971)
- Kulagar Prakashan Award (1990)
