= Edwin J. F. D'Souza =

Indian writer (1948–2023)

- Born: Edwin Joseph Francis D'Souza; 1948 Valencia, Mangalore, Mysore State, British India
- Died: 13 September 2023 (aged 74–75) Mangaluru, India
- Occupation: Writer, editor, academic administrator
- Language: Konkani, English
- Education: St. Aloysius College
- Notable works: Kallem Bhangar (novel)
- Notable awards: Sahitya Akademi Award (2016)
- Spouse: Jane D'Souza
- Children: 1

Edwin Joseph Francis D'Souza (1948 – 13 September 2023) was an Indian writer and editor from Mangaluru, recognized for his extensive contributions to Konkani literature. Over a career spanning nearly six decades, he published 33 novels and more than 100 short stories. In 2016, he received the Sahitya Akademi Award for his novel Kallem Bhangar (Black Gold).

== Early life and education ==
D'Souza was born in 1948 in the Valencia area of Mangaluru. He attended St. Aloysius College, where he earned a degree in commerce. He later pursued post-graduate studies in the arts.

== Career ==
=== Literary work ===
D'Souza began his writing career in 1964 with the publication of his first short story, titled "Aasha". His literary output eventually grew to include 33 novels and approximately 100 short stories, alongside various columns and articles. He wrote primarily in Konkani using the Kannada script, though he also wrote in English and translated some of his own short stories for English publications.

Among his most prominent works are the trilogies Vajrakant and Aashellem Raj. His novel Kallem Bhangar gained national recognition, earning him the Sahitya Akademi Award in 2016. Other notable books include Hanv Jiyetan and Poinn, the latter being a collection of short stories.

=== Academic and editorial roles ===
In his professional life, D'Souza served as the executive director of the Konkani Institute at St. Aloysius College. He held editorial positions for several publications, including the monthly Bhakti and the journal Amar Konkani. He was also a member of the General Council of the Sahitya Akademi in New Delhi and served on the Karnataka Konkani Sahitya Academy.

== Personal life ==
D'Souza resided at ‘Vailankanni’ in the Lower Bendore area of Mangaluru. He was married to Jane D'Souza, a retired principal. The couple had one son, Navin, who became a physician.

== Awards and honors ==
- Sahitya Akademi Award (2016) for the novel Kallem Bhangar.
- Karnataka Konkani Sahitya Academy Award (received eight times).
- Konkani Kutam Bahrain Award (2015).
- Dr. T.M.A. Pai Foundation Manipal Award for the book Hanv Jiyetham.
- Goa Konkani Bhasha Mandal Award for Aashellem Raj.

== Death ==
D'Souza died on 13 September 2023 at the age of 75.
