= Maya Kharangate =

Indian writer

Maya Anil Kharangate
- Born: June 20, 1956 (age 70)
- Education: B.A., BEd
- Occupations: Writer, poet, teacher
- Writing career
- Language: Konkani
- Genres: Novel, poetry
- Notable works: Amrutvel, Karyapanji, Oli Fantod
- Notable awards: Sahitya Akademi Bal Sahitya Puraskar (2013); Sahitya Akademi Award (2022)

Maya Anil Kharangate (born 20 June 1956) is an Indian writer and poet from Goa. She is primarily known for her works in Konkani literature, for which she was honored with the Sahitya Akademi Award in 2022.

== Literary career ==
Kharangate has contributed significantly to Konkani literature through novels and poetry. Her 2016 novel, Amrutvel, garnered national recognition for its portrayal of the social struggles faced by women. The story centers on the character Sitabai, a widow living in a Hindu joint family in pre-liberation Goa, and her challenges in raising her children after her husband's death. Beyond individual struggle, the novel also documents the participation of women in the Goa liberation movement.

In addition to her award-winning novel, her other notable works include the poetry collection Karyapanji (1990) and the book Oli Fantod, which was also shortlisted for the Sahitya Akademi Award.

== Awards and recognition ==
Kharangate's literary contributions have been recognized with several honors:

- Sahitya Akademi Award (2022): For her novel Amrutvel. The award consisted of an engraved copper plaque, a shawl, and a cash prize of ₹ 100,000.
- Sahitya Akademi Bal Sahitya Puraskar (2013): For her novel Ranachya Manant
