= Shashank Sitaram =

Indian writer (c. 1953 – 1994)

- Born: Ramchandra Shirodkar c. 1953
- Died: 1994 (aged 41)
- Writing career
- Language: Konkani
- Notable work: Parigh
- Notable awards: Sahitya Akademi Award (2003)

Ramchandra Shirodkar (c. 1953 – 1994), known professionally as Shashank Sitaram, was an Indian short story writer, recognized for his contributions to contemporary Konkani literature. He won the 2003 Sahitya Akademi Award in Konkani for Parigh, a collection of Konkani short stories.

== Literary career ==
Sitaram published a short story, Nobot, in 1989, and other works in magazines before that. Olivinho Gomes describes his work as reflecting the "rather turbid socio-political scenario in the land (of Goa), with a social upheaval that is driving a wedge between traditionally friendly communities, with fatal consequences for their peace and well being. He depicts situations involving home and college life, with sympathy, breaking through the barriers of technique in delineating his themes, though the language has yet to attain the necessary smooth flow and opulence, attuned to his fiction."

== Works ==
- Nobot (1989)
- Parigh, a collection of Konkani short stories

== Personal life ==
He was a teacher who taught at Nirakar High School in Mashem village in Canacona taluka.

== Death ==
Sitaram died in 1994 at the age of 41.

== Awards ==
He won the 2003 Sahitya Akademi Award in Konkani for Parigh, a collection of Konkani short stories.
