= Ashok Kamat =

Indian writer

- Born: Curchorem, Goa, India
- Occupations: Writer, academic scholar
- Known for: Ghannaghai Niyatiche
- Awards: Sahitya Akademi Award (2008)

Ashok Kamat is an Indian writer and academic scholar recognized for his contributions to Konkani literature and saint literature. He is a recipient of the Sahitya Akademi Award, India's national literary honour, for his writing in the Konkani language.

== Career and scholarship ==
Kamat has a background in academia, having served as the head of the Sant Namdev Adhyasan (Saint Namdev Chair) at Pune University. He is regarded as a scholar of both Marathi and Hindi. In his professional capacity, he has also served as the president of the Gurukul Pratishthan.

As a literary figure, Kamat hails from Curchorem, Goa. He is the author of the Konkani novel Ghannaghai Niyatiche, which is translated as "Cruel blows of destiny". The work was noted for its literary significance when it received national recognition in 2008.

== Awards and recognition ==
- Sahitya Akademi Award (2008): Conferred by the national academy of letters for his Konkani novel Ghannaghai Niyatiche.
- Maharashtra State Hindi Sahitya Akademi Award: Announced in recognition of his work as an analyst of saint literature.
