= R. S. Bhaskar =

Indian writer

R. S. Bhaskar is an Indian writer known for his work in the Konkani language. He won the 2020 Sahitya Akademi Award in Konkani for Yugparivartanacho Yatri, a collection of poems.

== Personal life ==
He is a native of Fort Kochi and works at CUSAT.

== Awards and accolades ==
- Sahitya Akademi Translation Prize (2003) for translating Vaikom Muhammad Basheer's Malayalam novel, Entuppuppakkoran-entarnu, into Konkani, titled, Mhaja Aajak Eki Hasti Aashilli
- Sahitya Akademi Award (2020) for Yugparivartanacho Yatri, a collection of poems.
- Vimala V Pai Vishwa Konkani Poetry Award (2024)
- Madhav Manjunath Shanbhag Konkani Bhasha Seva Puraskar (2025) by the Goa Konkani Akademi
