= Dattaram Sukhthankar =

Indian writer (1924–2005)

Dattaram Krishna Sukhthankar
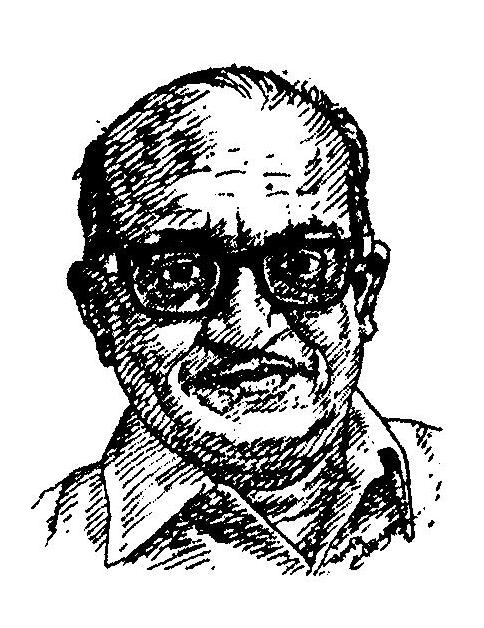
- Born: 11 December 1924; Mashel, Goa
- Died: 29 August 2005 (aged 80); Bandra, Mumbai, India
- Education: Escola Médico Cirúrgica de Goa
- Occupations: Writer; Medical practitioner
- Writing career
- Notable work: Manni Punav
- Notable awards: Sahitya Akademi Award (1968); Kala Academy Award; Maharashtra Gaurav Puraskar (1990)

Dattaram Krishna Sukhthankar (11 December 1924 – 29 August 2005) is a Konkani writer and medical practitioner from Goa. He is known for his humorous essays and is a recipient of the Sahitya Akademi Award.

== Early life and education ==
Dattaram Krishna Sukhthankar was born on 11 December 1924 in Mashel, Portuguese Goa. He completed his primary schooling in Mashel, followed by secondary education at the Almeida High School in Ponda. For higher education, he attended Rajaram College in Kolhapur. In 1953, he graduated with a medical degree from the Escola Médico Cirúrgica de Goa.

== Career ==
=== Activism ===
During the Portuguese rule in Goa, Sukhthankar participated in activities opposing the colonial regime, leading to his imprisonment by the Portuguese authorities for a period. He eventually left Goa and relocated to Bombay.

=== Medical practice ===
Professionally, Sukhthankar served at the Gandhi Leprosy Rehabilitation Center in Wardha and the Acworth Leprosy Home in Bombay. Later in his career, he established his own private medical practice.

=== Literary work ===
Sukhthankar is known for a writing style characterized by simple language and fine humour. His work has been featured in various magazines. His collection of essays, titled Manni Punav, received critical acclaim. In 1968, the book won the Sahitya Akademi Award. It was also awarded by the Kala Academy.

== Awards and recognition ==
In addition to the Sahitya Akademi and Goa Kala Academy awards for Manni Punav, Sukhthankar was honoured by the Government of Maharashtra in 1990. He received the "Maharashtra Gaurav Puraskar," a distinction awarded to Sahitya Akademi awardees residing in the state of Maharashtra.

== Personal life ==
Sukhthankar has traveled within India and internationally. As of 1999, he was retired and residing in Mumbai. He was married and had two children, a son and a daughter.

== Death ==
Sukhthankar died on 29 August 2005 at his residence in Bandra, Mumbai.
