= H. M. Pernal =

Indian writer

Henry Mendonca, better known by his pseudonym, H. M. Pernal, is an Indian writer. He won the 2025 Sahitya Akademi Award for Konkani.
