= Jess Fernandes =

Indian writer (born 1941)

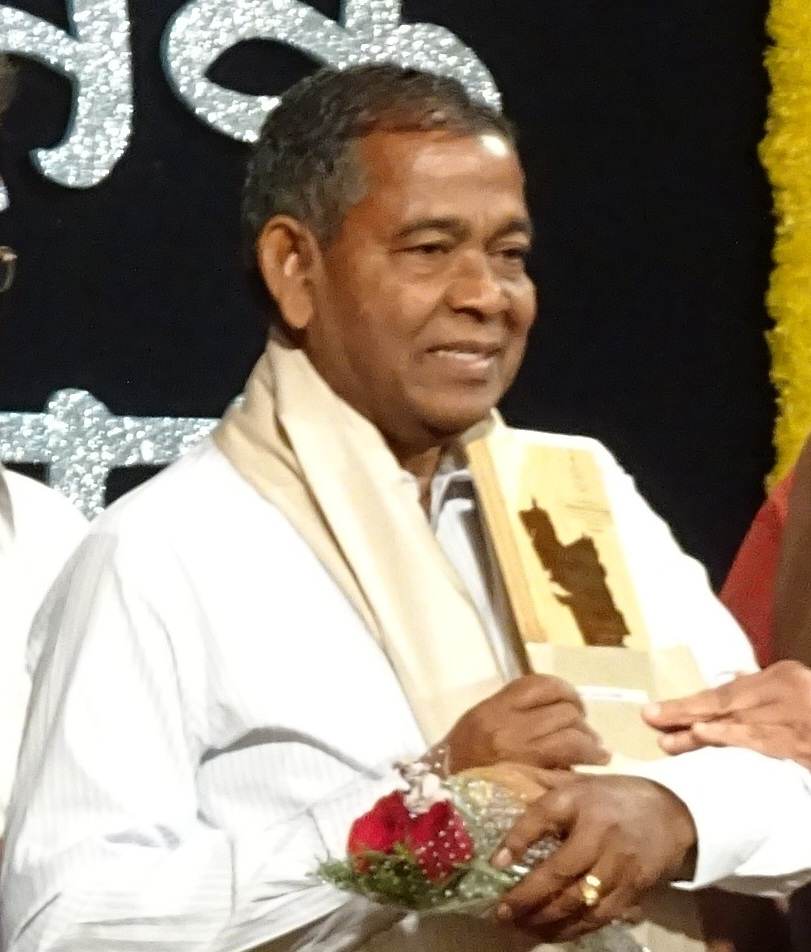
- Fernandes receiving the Goa State Cultural Award
- Born: 6 September 1941 (age 84)
- Occupation: Writer
- Writing career
- Language: Konkani language
- Notable work: Kirvontt
- Notable awards: Sahitya Akademi Award for Konkani (2009)

Jess Fernandes (born 6 September 1941) is an Indian Konkani writer and poet. He is a recipient of the Sahitya Akademi Award and is recognized for his contributions to Konkani literature, particularly in the Roman script.

== Literary career ==
Fernandes is a prolific author in Konkani literature. In April 2010, his collection of poems titled Kirvontt was released in Panaji. The book was previously selected for the Sahitya Akademi Award for Konkani in 2009. In 2024, Fernandes authored a book titled Vontth Mhoje Kristak Gaitat (transl. My Lips Sing for Christ). The book launch was held at the Tiatr Academy of Goa in Panaji and was organized by the Dalgado Konknni Akademi (DKA). The work focuses on religious themes centered on the life and teachings of Jesus Christ.

== Awards and recognition ==
Fernandes has received several honors for his literary work:

- Sahitya Akademi Award (2009): Conferred for his poetry collection Kirvontt.
- Goa State Cultural Award (2014): For his contributions to literature
- Dalgado Sahityik Puraskar (2017): Awarded by the Dalgado Konknni Akademi in recognition of his standing as a veteran writer and his significant contributions to Konkani literature.
