= Pundalik Naik =

Indian poet and writer (born 1952)

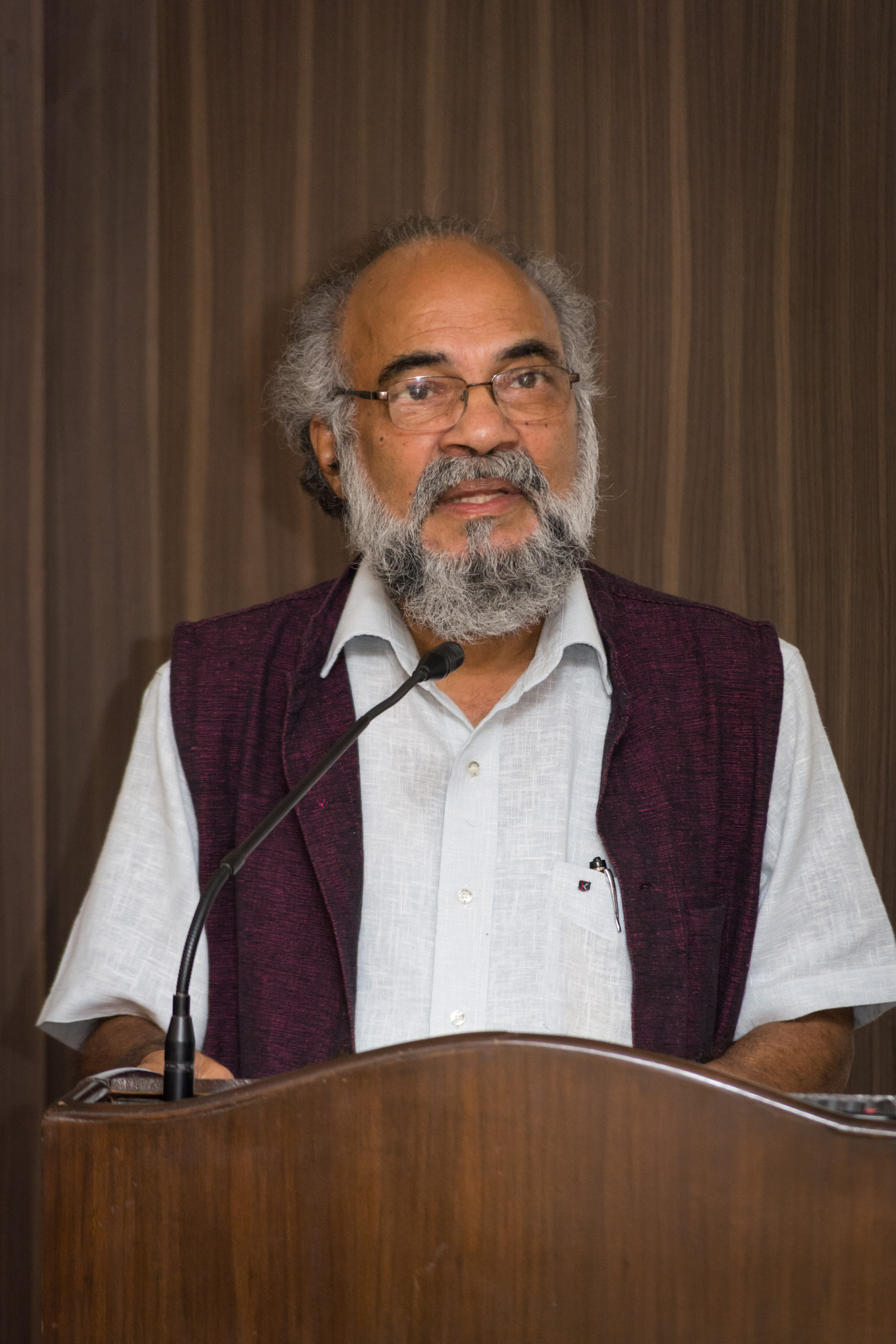
- Naik in 2016
- Born: Pundalik Narayan Naik; 21 April 1952 (age 74); Volvoi, Portuguese Goa
- Occupations: Writer; playwright
- Spouse: Hema Naik
- Writing career
- Language: Konkani
- Notable awards: Sahitya Akademi Award
- Movement: Konkani language agitation

Pundalik Narayan Naik (born 21 April 1952) is an Indian Konkani poet, short-story writer, novelist, playwright, and screenwriter. He has 40 books and two films to his credit.

== Early life and education ==
Naik was born on 21 April 1952, in Volvoi, Goa, to Narayan and Lakshmi. Raised in a rural agricultural family, he closely observed and experienced agrarian life from his childhood, which significantly shaped the thematic focus and minute observations found in his later literary career.

He completed his secondary school education up to the S.S.C. level at the Government High School in Savoi-Verem. Following this, he pursued higher education up to Inter Arts at the Dhempe College of Arts and Science in Panaji.

== Career ==
Naik began his professional career as a school teacher, a role he maintained for six years, from 1972 to 1978. In 1979, he was appointed as a sub-editor at the Panaji center of Akashvani (All India Radio). He was later promoted to the position of assistant editor for scripts within the organization. He resigned from his job at Akashvani in 1984 to dedicate himself fully to his creative pursuits.

Naik possessed a strong inclination toward literature from his childhood, and his formal work in Konkani literary production began in 1972. He established himself as an all-round writer, contributing to poetry, short stories, novellas, novels, plays, and one-act plays. His writings often depict the struggles, suffering, injustices, and aspirations of the weaker sections of society, while capturing the progressive transitions and social barriers within Goan life. While he excelled across genres, his contributions to Konkani theater and drama are considered particularly valuable. He experimented with stage production techniques and directed several Konkani plays.

Beyond playwriting, Naik edited Rutu, a Konkani poetry periodical, for many years. His creative writing also extended to broadcasting and audio-visual media, including scriptwriting for both Marathi and Konkani telefilms.

== Activism and public roles ==
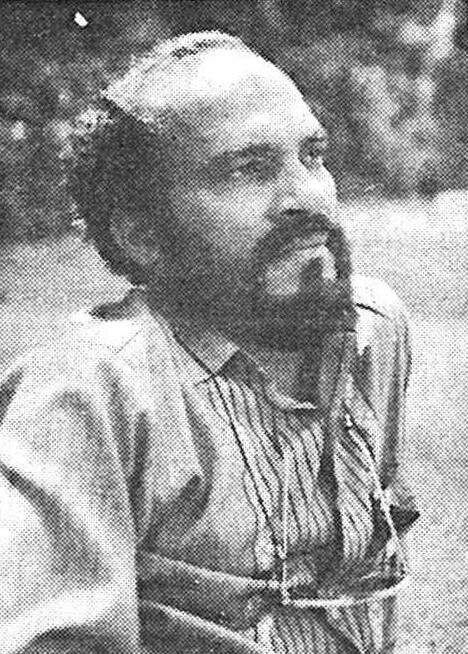
Pundalik Naik in his youth

Naik played a prominent and valuable role in the historic public movement to secure official status for the Konkani language in Goa. He functioned as the convener of Konkani Porjecho Avaz, the primary organization that led the language agitation.

He served as the President of Goa Konkani Akademi (Goa Academy of Letters for Konkani) of the Government of Goa since 2002.

== Notable works ==
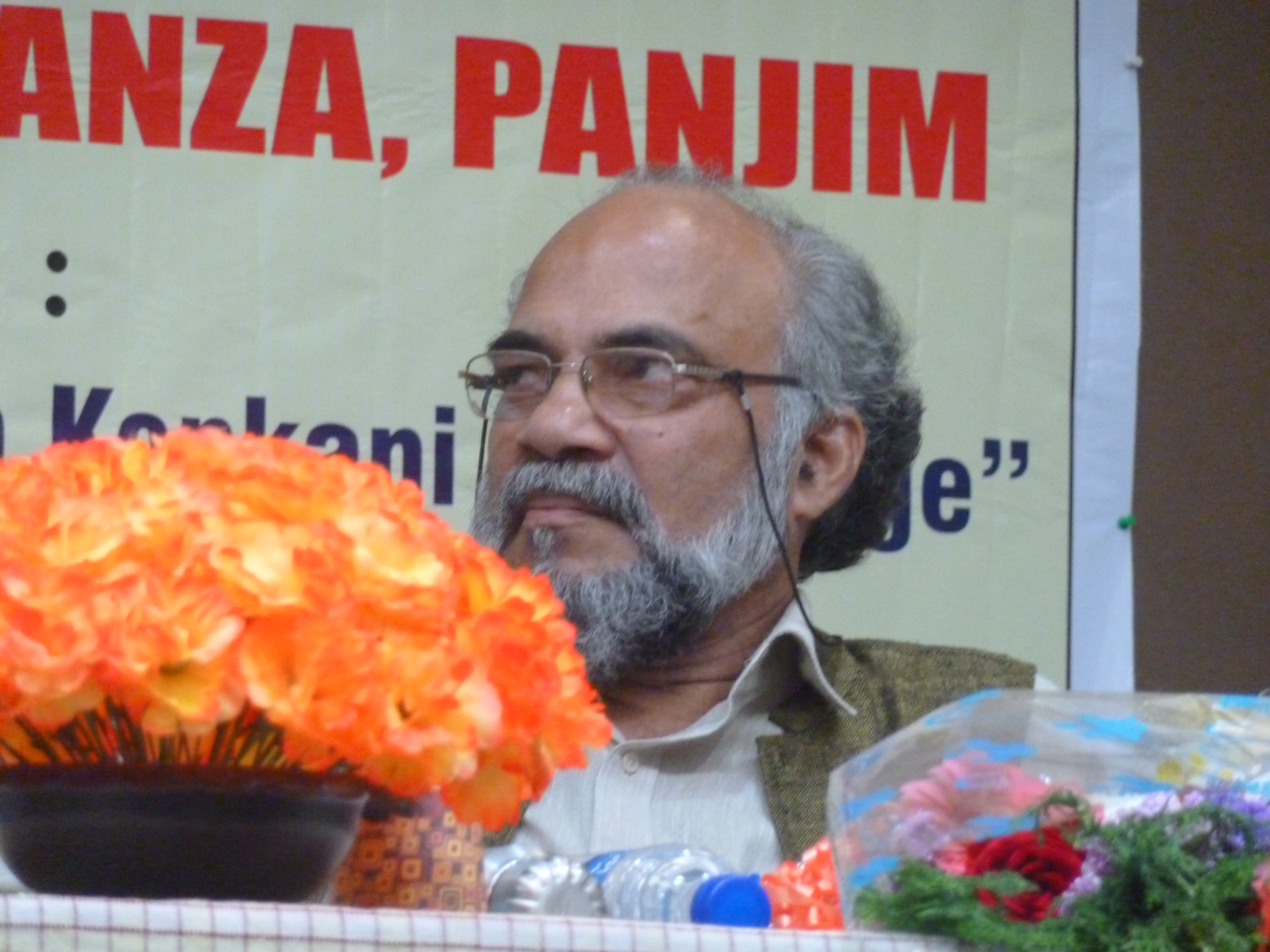
Konkani litterateur from Goa, Pundalik Narayan Naik, at a function at the Institute Menezes Braganza

In all, Naik has 32 plays, and collections of short stories, novels, novellas, translations and books of children's rhyme to his credit. He is considered a pioneer in the realm of Konkani drama.

Some of his plays are as follows:

Name of play	Year	Theme
Ransundari	1974	Verse play written for children
Chhappan Thigali Yashwantrao	1980	Tragedy of a loader at a bus stand
Suring	1982	Plight of labourers building roads
Demand	1986	Realistic portrayal of illiterate folk seeking justice at courts
Dayz		Dowry
Shabai Shabai Bahujan Samaj	1986	Scathing socio politico satire

Some have complained that "his works are pretty difficult to bring into English and other languages". There is also an essay (translated into English by Vidya Pai) explaining how Naik's Acchev happened. This essay (in Konkani) was originally published in the special issue of the Konkani literary magazine Jaag released to celebrate 150 years of the Konkani novel in early 2012.

During a five-day theatre festival on the plays of Pundalik Naik, called Natyarang Pancham, held in 2011, the plays staged were Shabay Shabay Bhaujan Samaj, Kaansulo, Suring, Chaityanak Math Naa and Shree Vichitrachi Jatra.

Naik took to writing plays in 1977. The Shubham Naik Trust and the Directorate of Art and Culture had organised a festival of selected Konkani plays of Pundalik Naik at five regional centers including Masordem—Sattari, Mandrem—Pernem, Sanguem, Chaudi—Canacona and Shiroda—Ponda.

Naik has also written plays for radio and television, and has edited films.

Some more of his works include:

- Poetry: Ga Ami Rakhne
- Story collections: Pishantar, Muthay, and Arghuk
- Novellas: Bambar, Vasantotsav, and Dayaj
- Novels: Acchev
- Plays: Khan Khan Mati, Raktakhev, Rakhan, Suring, Suryasanvat, Demand, Muktatai, Shabay Shabay Bhaujan Samaj, Pimpal Petla, Shree * Vichitrachi Jatra, Dayaj, and Chaitanyak Math Na
- One-act play collections: Gavdhani Gavkar, Chaurang, and Digant
- Radio play collections: Akashmanch
- Children's literature: Ransundari (musical play), Aalshyank Vag Khatlo (short play), and Manu (novella)
- Short plays: Chhapann Thigali Yashwant
- Edited volumes: Venchik Konkani Ekanki
- Translations: Kazi Nazrul Islam and Nanalal

=== Works in translation ===
- Upheaval (Achhev), tr. by Vidya Pai. Oxford University Press, 2002. ISBN 0-19-566039-0.

== Adaptations and broadcasts ==
Naik's literature has been adapted extensively across different media and languages throughout India:

- His play Shree Vichitrachi Jatra was translated and produced in the Tamil language.
- The plays Pimpal Petla and Shree Vichitrachi Jatra were adapted into Marathi and staged on the theater scene.
- Drama adaptations of his scripts Marnakato, Shree Vichitrachi Jatra, and Panj were translated into multiple Indian languages and broadcast nationwide across various radio stations.
- The Panaji station of Doordarshan broadcast television adaptations of his works, presenting Ransundari as a children's play, Jait as a telefilm, and Marnakato as a teleplay.

== Reception ==
His novel Acchev (The Upheaval, 1977), the first Konkani novel to be translated into English, is considered a landmark in the history of the language. It is a story based in a Goa wrecked by rampant mining. Acchev has been described as a novel which "describes peasant life in the Ponda [sub-]district and shows what happens when a traditional society that lives by myths and rituals comes into contact with modern mechanised ways of life."

Manohar Shetty, in a review in the Deccan Herald, writes: "Pundalik Naik's novel is set in this grim backdrop, chronicling in detail the decay of a self-sufficient agricultural community with the impassive invasion of the mining industry. Naik's novel, the first to be translated from Konkani, created something of a sensation when it appeared in 1977. No other writer in Goa had portrayed in such graphic and brutal detail the ruinous fallouts on small agricultural holdings by the bulldozers of big industry. Pandhari, the protagonist of the novel, is the first to fall into the tempting shaft. Just before the auspicious day of sowing, Babuso, a wily and unscrupulous go-between, approaches him for his services as a load-bearer and to hire his bullock-cart to carry ore from the mines. Pandhari succumbs to the allure of quick money and in an instant becomes a bonded labourer and the bullocks, which once ploughed the life-sustaining fields, become a transport vehicle, the cart laden with the metallic spoils of the pillaged land."

== Awards ==
He was awarded the Sahitya Akademi Award in Konkani for his work, Chowrang, in 1984, by Sahitya Akademi, India's National Academy of Letters. He was awarded the Gomant Sharda Puraskar for Lifetime Achievement in 2010.

He has also been bestowed the AIR's Playwright Award (1986, 1987), the Paters Award of the Australian Academy of Broadcasting and Science (1988), the Government of Goa award for children's drama (1975), and the Konkani Bhasha Mandal Prize. In 2013, the Sangeet Natak Akademi award came on account of his contribution to Indian theatre as a playwright.

Other awards include:

- 1975–1983: Literary awards from the Konkani Bhasha Mandal for various books.
- State Awards: Received State Awards from the Kala Academy for his novel Acchev and his children's musical play Ransundari.
- 1980: Won the All-India Akashvani Award for the presentation of his one-act play Marnakato.
- 1984: Awarded the prestigious Sahitya Akademi Award by the Indian Sahitya Akademi for his one-act play collection Chaurang.
- 1985: Selected by the Indian Jaycees as one of the ten outstanding young individuals of the nation.
- 1986: Won the All-India Akashvani Award for his play Shree Vichitrachi Jatra.
- 1987: Secured the first prize in the All-India Radio Playwriting Competition organized by Akashvani for his radio play Mhasagarantle Tarum.
- 1988: Received the international Paters Australian Award from the Australian Academy of * Broadcasts for his play Shree Vichitrachi Jatra.
- Other honours: Conferred with the Swargest Gundu Sitaram Amonkar Award.

== Personal life ==
He is married to Hema Naik, also a Konkani writer.
