= Devidas Kadam =

Indian writer

Devidas Kadam is an Indian writer. He won the 2007 Sahitya Akademi Award in Konkani language for his novel, Dika. He won the 2019 Smt Vimala V Pai Vishwa Konkani Sahitya Puraskar for his novel, Jaanvay.
