= Goa Konkani Akademi =

Konkani organization based in Goa, India

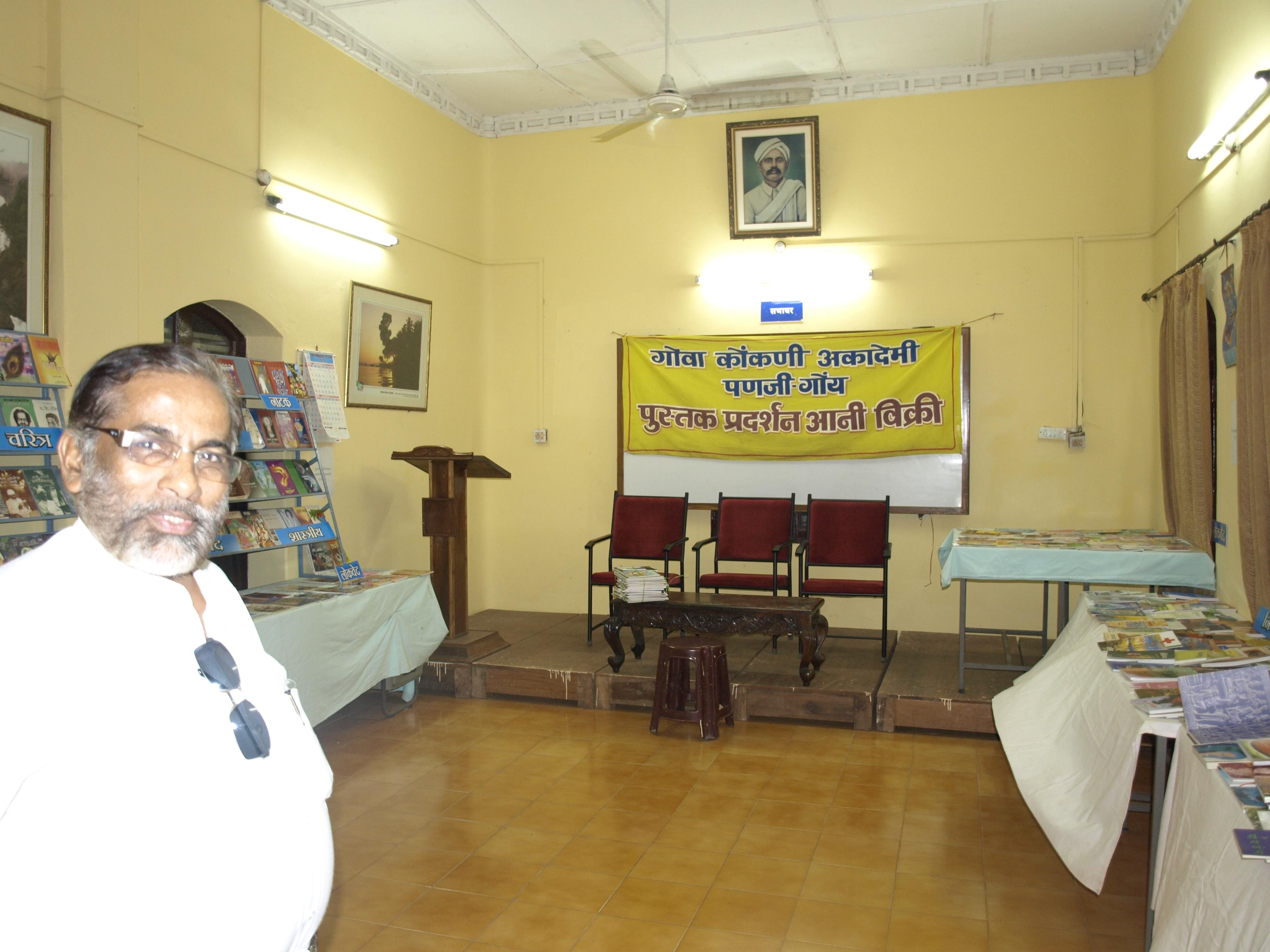
Goa Konkani Akademi

The Goa Konkani Akademi (Goa Academy of Letters for Konkani) is an organization set up by the Government of Goa in 1986 to promote the Konkani language in the state of Goa. The aim is to accelerate the pace of development of the language by encouraging writers, researchers, etc, and to bring Konkani people from all regions together.

== Nature ==
The Goa Konkani Akademi was founded on 4 March 1986. It is an autonomous body and has jurisdiction over the state of Goa. It undertakes activities for the development and promotion of Konkani. GKA receives grants from the Government of Goa.

The current Akademi President is Pundalik Naik (2002–present). Past presidents were Purushottam Kakodkar (1984-1996) and Uday Bhembre (1996-2002) respectively.

== Aims and objectives ==
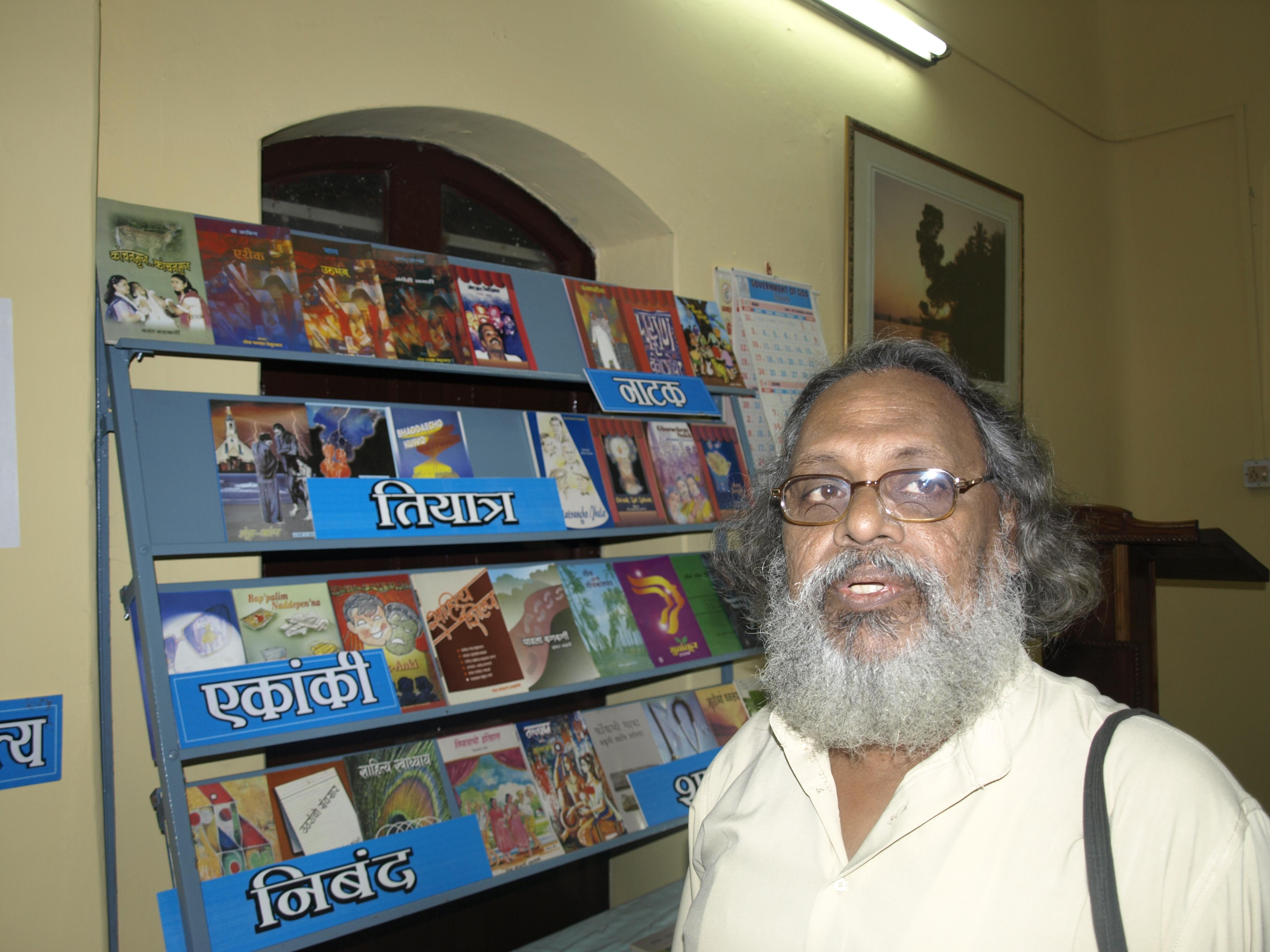
Goa Konkani Akademi - writer Ramesh Veluskar (late) at the book outlet

The Akademi was built with the purpose of promoting the growth of Konkani. Some of the major goals stated on its website are:

1. To initiate, assist or undertake implementation of projects or schemes of research in the field of Konkani language, literature and culture.
2. To initiate, assist or undertake publication in Konkani language, the results of such research.
3. To initiate, assist or undertake publication in Konkani language of original and erudite papers, monographs, books, journal, as also of any other works in any other branch of knowledge.

The GKA carries out its activities under directions issued to it by the Government of Goa. It also assists the state Government in formulating various policies in regard to Konkani.

== Activities ==
The GKA conducts various activities

1. Providing financial assistance(75% of cost) to the first book by a new author.
2. Provides 50% financial assistance to publishers and purchases 100 copies of each book.
3. Section on folklore
4. Has undertaken a project to publish a dictionary-cum-encyclopedia in Konkani.
5. Conducts a "Knowledge of Konkani" certificate test which is necessary for Government Jobs in Goa. Also has other certificate exams.
6. Has organized a five-day annual cultural event since 1993.

== Organization structure ==
The Organization has various sections

1. Education Section: Post-graduate and certificate courses; teacher training
2. Lexicon Section: Creation of Konkani encyclopedia and dictionaries
3. Folklore Section: collection of various media related to folklore
4. Literature Section: Oversees various publication schemes
5. Cultural Section: Drama, tiatr(theatre) and documentaries.

== Leadership ==
Following have been the Presidents of the GKA, since its inception.

Caption
President	Date
Purushottam Kakodkar	1984-1993
Purushottam Kakodkar	1993-1996
Purushottam Kakodkar	1996, Jan to Oct
Adv. Uday L. Bhembre	1996-1999
Adv. Uday L. Bhembre	1999-2002
Pundalik N. Naik	2002-2005
Pundalik N. Naik	2005-2008
N. Shivdas	2009-2011
Dilip Borkar	2012 Jan-Apr
Pundalik N. Naik	2012-2015
Madhav Borkar	2015-2017
Director, directorate of Official Language	2017-2019
Suresh Gundu Amonkar	2019

== Criticism ==
The GKA has been accused of being biased against Konkani publications in the Roman script in the past. Another demand has been that the GKA should be headed by persons of both the major communities in Goa (Hindus and Christians) by rotation.

In March 2017, three prominent members of the GKA committee—Chairman Madhav Borkar, Vice Chairman Jose Lourenco and member Kamlakar Mhalshi—quit their posts "citing issues in receiving funds from the government to conduct various Konkani language promotion programmes."

There have been controversies over the some books that the GKA has turned down or declined to support.

The GKA has a book publishing programme, but visibility of the books produced is seen as probably insufficient to what could be possible. One reason could be the "low-price, no-distributor-margins policy" as being responsible for the lack of interest by distributors, and hence low readership of its books.

== Location ==
The Goa Konkani Akademi's office is situated at Patto Colony, Panaji, Goa.

== See also ==
- Konkani language
