= Kashinath Shamba Lolienkar =

Indian writer

S. D. Tendulkar, known by his pseudonym Kashinath Shamba Lolienkar, (born 22 July 1957) is an Indian writer. He won the 2012 Sahitya Akademi Award in Konkani for Kavyasutra, a collection of poems.
