= Ravindra Kelekar =

Indian author and activist (1925–2010)

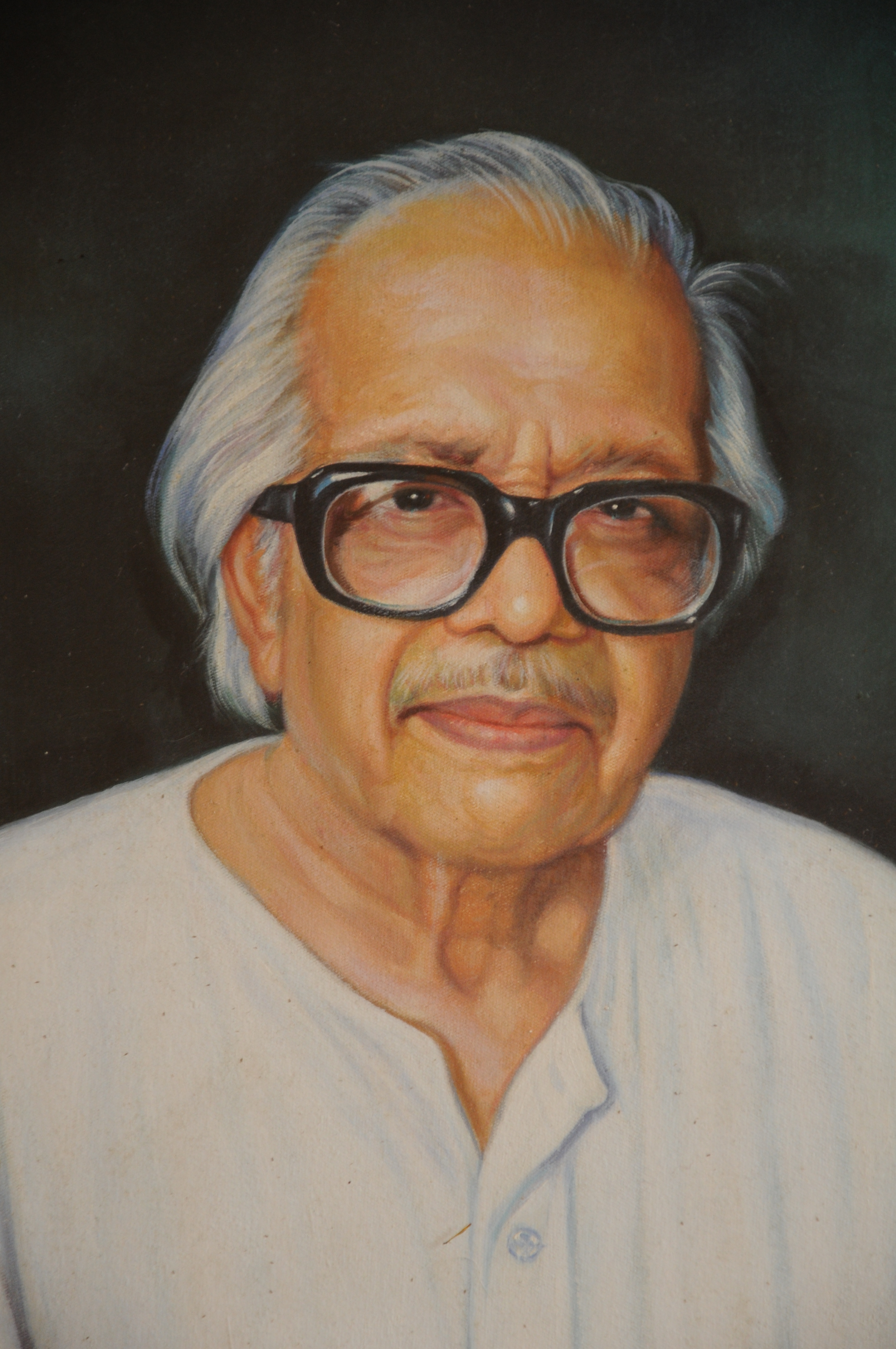
- Portrait of Kelekar
- Born: 7 March 1925; Cuncolim, Goa, Portuguese India
- Died: 27 August 2010 (aged 85); Margao, Goa, India
- Resting place: Priol, Goa, India
- Occupations: freedom fighter, linguistic activist, poet, author
- Spouse: Godubai Sardesai (m. 1949)
- Children: 1
- Relatives: Madhavi Sardesai (niece); Vijai Sardesai (nephew)
- Writing career
- Language: Konkani

Ravindra Kelekar (7 March 1925 – 27 August 2010) was an Indian author who wrote primarily in the Konkani language, though he also wrote in Marathi and Hindi. A Gandhian activist, freedom fighter and a pioneer in the modern Konkani movement, he was a well known Konkani scholar, linguist, and creative thinker. Kelekar was a participant in the Indian freedom movement, Goa's liberation movement, and later the campaign against the merger of the newly formed Goa with Maharashtra. He played a key role in the founding of the Konkani Bhasha Mandal, which led the literary campaign for the recognition of Konkani as a full-fledged language, and its reinstatement as the state language of Goa. He authored nearly 100 books in the Konkani language, including Amchi Bhas Konkaneech, Shalent Konkani Kityak, Bahu-bhashik Bharatant Bhashenche Samajshastra and Himalayant, and also edited Jaag magazine for more than two decades.

Kelekar died at Apollo Hospital at Margao, Goa at around 11.30 am on Friday, 27 August 2010. He was 85. His remains were cremated with State honours at his native village of Priol.

Kelekar received the Padma Bhushan (2008), the Gomant Sharada Award of Kala Academy, the Sahitya Akademi Award (1977), and the Sahitya Akademi Fellowship (2007)—the highest award of the Sahitya Akademi, India's National Academy of Letters. He also received the 2006 Jnanpith Award, the first ever awarded to an author writing in the Konkani language, which was presented in July 2010.

== Early life and education ==
Ravindra Kelekar was born on 7 March 1925, in Cuncolim, Portuguese Goa. He was named Chandrakant after his mother Chandra. Itt was later changed to Ravindra by his maternal grandfather Lingubab Dalvi. His father, Dr Rajaram Kelekar, was a physician who later became renowned for his Portuguese translation of the Bhagwad Gita. Most of his childhood was spent in Diu. Afterwards he returned to Goa for his further studies. While still a student at the Lyceum High School in Panaji, Kelekar joined the Goa liberation movement in 1946, which brought him in close contact with several local and national leaders, including Ram Manohar Lohia, under whose influence he was able to recognise the power of language to mobilise the local populace. Later, he saw the potential in his native Konkani language, which became his lifelong work.

== Career ==
Already deeply influenced by Gandhian philosophy, in 1949 Kelekar left his native Goa for Wardha, to be with noted Gandhian and writer Kakasaheb Kalelkar. Kelekar stayed under Kalelkar's tutelage until 1955, when he was appointed librarian of the Gandhi Memorial Museum in New Delhi. This turned out to be short-lived, as only a year later he plunged back into the Goa freedom movement. With a mission to reconnect the Goan diaspora all over the world, he started the weekly, Gomant Bharati (1956–60), published in the Latin script in Bombay. Soon after, being an active participant in Goa's struggle for freedom, he was imprisoned by the Portuguese. He was released when the Indian Army invaded and annexed Goa in 1961.

He joined the socio-political campaign against the merger of Goa into the neighbouring Maharashtra state, which ended after the plebiscite of 1967 (the Goa Opinion Poll), with Goa retaining its separate identity as a union territory. Goa retained this status until 1987, when it was declared a state.

After Goa's independence, Kelekar took to literary activism, getting his native tongue, Konkani, recognized as a distinct language (rather than a dialect of Marathi). He was compared favourably with pioneers in the Konkani literary movement, such as Shenoi Goembab. During this period, he wrote some of his most important works promoting the Konkani language, including Aamchi Bhas Konkanich (1962), a dialogue revealing the importance of Konkani to the common man on the street; Shallent Konkani Kityaak (1962), highlighting the significance of having Konkani medium schools in Goa; and A Bibliography of Konkani Literature in Devanagari, Roman and Kannada characters (1963). In February 1987, the Goa Legislative Assembly had passed the Official Language Bill making Konkani the Official Language of Goa. The struggle ended in 1992, when Konkani was included in the Eighth Schedule of the Indian Constitution as an official language. With life's mission completed, Kelkar retired from public life, focusing mainly of his writing.

On 26 February 1975, the Sahitya Akademi, India's National Academy of Letters, recognised Konkani as an independent language. The first Sahitya Akademi Award for a work in Konkani was won by Kelekar for his travelogue, Himalayant, in 1977. The Akademi's first Sahitya Akademi Translation Prize in Konkani also went to Kelekar in 1990 for Ami Taankan Manshant Haadle, a Konkani translation of a collection of essays in Gujarati, Mansaeena Diva, by Jhaverchand Meghani. He received the 2006 Jnanpith Award, which was the first given to a Konkani-language writer. The pinnacle of his career came with the Sahitya Akademi Fellowship for lifetime achievement in 2007. A lifelong proponent of regional languages, in his acceptance speech for the Jnanpith award, he said, "People have stopped reading books in regional languages. On the other hand, through English, we have created Bonsai intellectuals, Bonsai writers and Bonsai readers."

When the Vishwa Konkani Sahitya Academy, an offshoot of the Konkani Language and Cultural Foundation, was set up in 2006, the first work it took up for translation was Velavaylo Dhulo, a collection of Kelekar's essays. His books have been translated into Hindi and other North Indian languages, and are used by universities.

== Personal life ==
Kelekar married Godubai Sardesai in 1949; their son Girish was born in April 1950. Kelekar lived in his ancestral home—built by his father in 1937—called "Kelekar House", in the village of Priol in central Goa. The Casa Dos Kelekars, as it is formally known, is now seen as exemplary of a typical Goan community home.

== Bibliography ==
=== Konkani ===
- Kelekar, Ravindra (1976). Himalayant [In the Himalayas] (in Konkani).
- Navi Shala
- Satyagrah
- Mangal Prabhat
- Mahatma
- Ashe Ashille Gandhiji
- Katha ani Kanyo
- Tulshi
- Velevoilio Ghulo
- Bhaja Govindam
- Uzvadeche Sur
- Bhashechem Samaj Shashtra
- Mukti
- Teen eke Teen
- Lala Bala
- Brahmandantlem Tandav
- Panthastha
- Samidha
- Vothambe
- Sarjakachi Antar Katha

=== Konkani translations ===
- Mahabharata (two volumes)

=== Marathi ===
- Japan Jasa Disla
- Gnyannidhicha Sahavasat
