= Bakibab Borkar =

Indian poet (1910–1984)

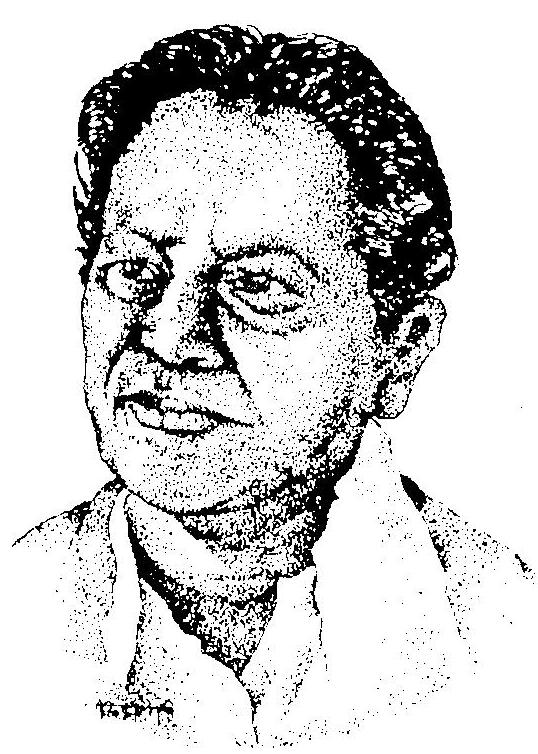
- Balakrishna Bhagawant Borkar
- Born: Balakrishna Bhagawant Borkar; 30 November 1910; Borim, Goa, Portuguese India
- Died: 8 July 1984 (aged 73)
- Occupations: Freedom fighter, poet, author, linguistic activist
- Writing career
- Language: Marathi, Konkani
- Notable awards: Padma Shri

Balakrishna Bhagwant "Bakibab" Borkar (Marathi: Ba. Bha. Borkar; 30 November 1910 – 8 July 1984), also known as Ba-ki-baab, was an Indian poet. He started writing poems at an early age. Writer Vishnu Sakharam Khandekar was an early champion of Borkar's poetry. Borkar joined Goa's liberation movement in the 1950s and moved to Poona, where he worked for the radio. Most of his literature is written in Marathi, though his Konkani output is also considerable. He excelled as a prose writer as well. His long poems Mahatmayan, an unfinished poem dedicated to Mahatma Gandhi, and TamaHstotra are famous. One of his famous poems is "Mazha Gaav", meaning "My village". After Borkar's death, fellow Marathi writer Pu La Deshpande and his wife Sunitabai performed public readings of Borkar's poetry.

== Life and career ==
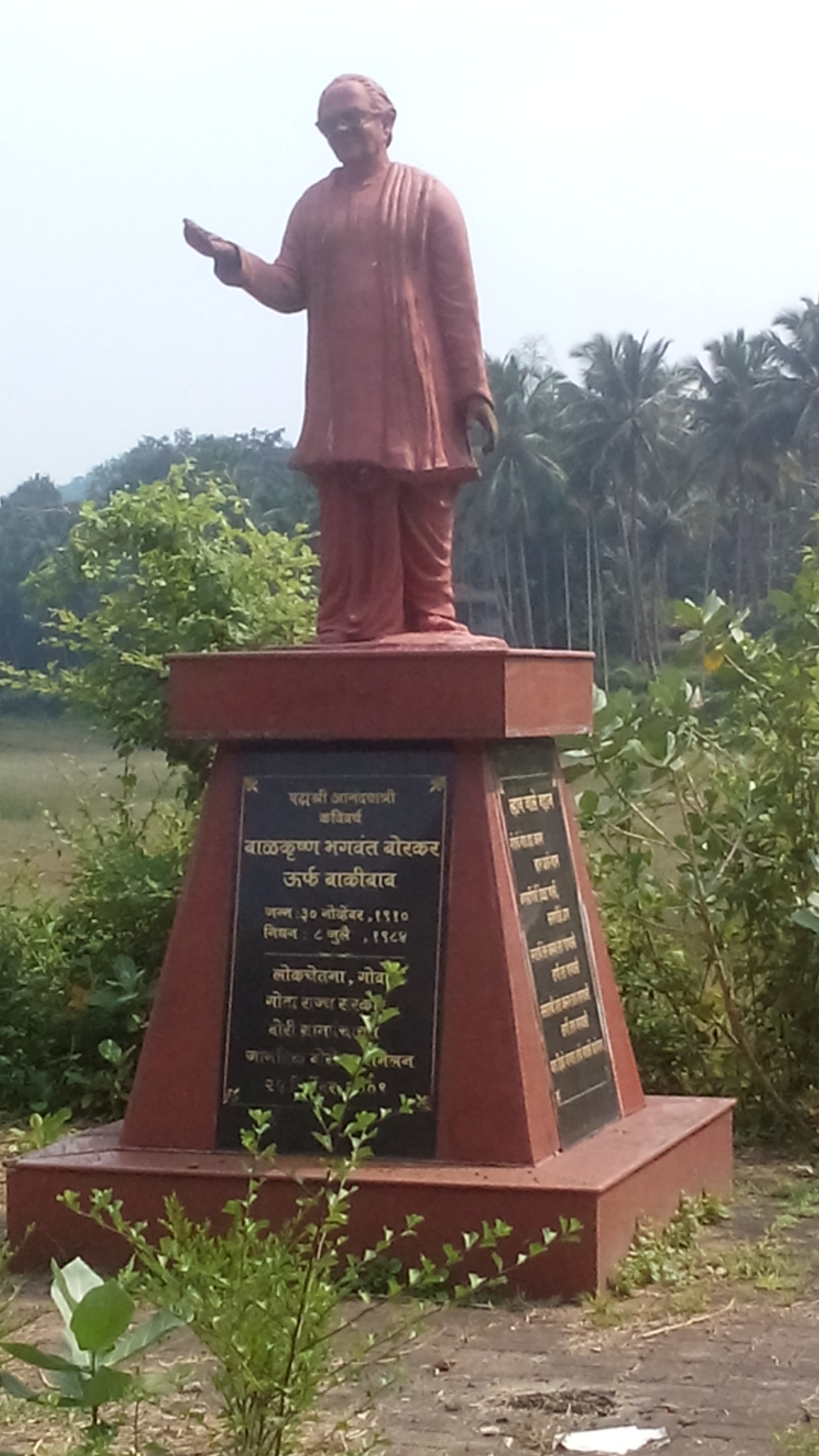
Bakibaab's statue in Goa

Balkrishna Bhagwant Borkar was born on 30 November 1910 in the village of Borim, Goa situated on the banks of the Zuari river. The atmosphere in his house was very pious and there used to be recitals of bhajans, kirtans, holy scripts and songs of saints of Maharashtra. As a household rule every child was supposed to learn new Abhangs by heart.

It is said that Borkar once forgot to learn a new Abhang and when it was his turn to recite, he composed an Abhnag on the fly. People who were listening were astonished and could not believe that young Borkar could have done this and he was asked to compose one more Abhang. He surprised them again by composing one more Abhang and ended it with the verse "Baki Mhane" (so says Baki).

Borkar's mother tongue was Konkani and he did his schooling till the second grade in Marathi medium. Goa at that time was under the colonial rule of the Portuguese and Baki had to complete his further education in Portuguese language. He acquired a Portuguese Teachers Diploma. He went on to complete the tough teachers’ training course at the Escola Normal in 1936, where he was exposed to world literature, thanks mainly to his Goan teacher, the scholarly Dona Propercia Correia Afonso. He could not continue his formal education beyond that point because of lack of funds and had to find himself a job. He worked as teacher in various schools in Goa from 1930 to 1945. Later he left for Bombay (Mumbai) where he edited Konkani periodicals Amacha Gomatak and Porjecho Awaj. In November 1955 he joined Aakashwani (All India Radio). A stint at the Panaji Akashvani Kendra followed in post-liberation Goa from 1962 till his retirement in 1970. Bakibab was also the President of the Institute Menezes Braganza from 1964 to 1970.

Bakibaab's first collection of poems "Pratibha" was published in 1930. He was just 20 years of age at that time. He was enthralled by nature, especially Goa's natural beauty and it is aptly depicted in his poems and work. When Dr. Rammanohar Lohia went to Goa in 1946 to announce the liberation movement, Bakibaab jumped into the freedom struggle without a moment's notice. His composition Goyan Lohia Aaylore (Lohia has come to Goa) became quite famous. Leaving behind a household of ten supported by him and sacrificing a secure government job, he jumped in wholeheartedly into the movement and took up the mission to spread patriotism through his poems.

Bakibaab forte was his diverse sensibility, his multi-coloured imagery and easy with which he could showcase the joys and sorrows of life. His works were about nature, patriotism, about body and soul, sensuous and meditative, about individual and society. He was poet of Goa, poet of Maharashtra. He was poet of India. He was awarded Padma Shri, India's fourth highest civilian award, by the then President S. Radhakrishnan in recognition of his distinguished service in the field of Literature & Education. He was also awarded the Tamrapatra (Copper Plaque) in 1974 by the Government of India for his meritorious services to the cause of India's freedom. Bakibaab died on 8 July 1984.

== Published works – Marathi ==
Poetic work

- "Pratibha" (1930): Publisher: Kashinath Shridhar Nayak (Mumbai)
- "Jeevansangeet" (1937) Bharat Gaurav Granthmala (Mumbai)
- "Dudhsagar" (1947)
- "Anand Bhairavi" (1950) Continental Prakashan (Pune)
- "Chitraveena" (1960), 4th edition 1985, Mauj Prakashan (Mumbai)
- "Borkaranchi Kavita" (1960), Mauj Prakashan (Mumbai)
- "Guitar" (1965), 2nd edition 1984, Mauj Prakashan (Mumbai)
- "Chaitrapunav" (1970), Mauj Prakashan (Mumbai)
- "Chandanvel" (1972), 2nd edition 1984, Editors: Kusumagraj and G.M. Kulkarni, Continental Prakashan (Pune)
- "Meghdoot" (1980) – Translation of Kalidas's work, Shrividya Prakashan (Pune)
- "Kanchan Sandhya" (1981), Mauj Prakashan (Mumbai)
- "Anuragini" (1982), Suresh Agency (Pune)
- "Chinmayee" (1984), Suresh Agency (Pune)
- "Borkaranchi Prem Kavita" (1984), Editor: R.C. Dhere, Suresh Agency (Pune)
- "Kaivalya Che Zaad" (1987), Suresh Agency (Pune)

Short stories

- "Kagadi Hodya" (1938), Shri Shivaji Mudranalay, Nave Goy
- "Chandnyache Kavadse" (1982), Majestic Book Stall, Mumbai
- "Pavala Purta Prakash" (1982), Alok Prakashan, Kolhapur
- "Ghumtavarle Parve" (1986), Bandodkar Publication House, Goa

Novels

- "Mavalta Chandra" (1938) Maharashtra Granth Bhandar, Kolhapur. 3rd edition 1986 Bandokar Publishing House, Goa
- "Andharantil Laataa" (1943) Damodar Moghe, Kolhapur. 2nd edition 1986 Bandodkar Publishing House, Goa
- "Bhavin" (1950) Continental Prakashan, Pune
- "Priycama" (1983) Suresh Agency, Pune

Biographies

- "Anandyatri Ravindranath: Sanskar Ani Sadhana" (1964), 2nd edition Suresh Agency (Pune)
- "Mahamanav Ravindranath" (1974), Pune University

Translations

- "Jalte Rahasya" (Stephen Zweig) 1945, V.N. Moghe, Kolhapur
- "Kachechi Kimaya" (Stephen Zwing) 1945, P.R.Dhamdhere, Pune
- "Bapuji Chi Ozarti Darshane" (Kakasaheb Kalelkar) 1950
- "Amhi Pahilele Gandhiji" (Chandrashekhar Shukla) 1950
- "Majhi Jeevan Yatra" (Autobiography-Janki Devi Bajaj) 1960, Popular Prakashan, Mumbai

Edited work

- "Rasyatra" – Kusumagraj's poems (1969) Continental, Pune

== Published works – Konkani ==
Poetic work

- "Painjana", 1960, Popular Prakashan, Mumbai.
- "Sasaay", 1980, Kulagar Prakashan, Madgaon.
- "Kanthamani", Jaag Prakashan, India

Translations

- "Geeta Pravachan" (Vinoba), Pardham, Pavnar, 1956
- "Geetay", 1960, Popular, Mumbai
- "Vasavdutt-Ek Pranay natya" (Arvind Ghosh), 1973, Jaag Prakashan, Priol (Goa)
- "Paigambar" (Khalil Jibran), 1973, Jaag Prakashan, Priol (Goa)
- "Sanshay Kallol" (G.B. Deval), 1975, Jaag Prakashan, Priol (Goa)
- "Bhagwan Buddh" (Dharmanand Kossambi), Sahitya Academy
- "Konkani Kavya Sangraha", 1981, Sahitya Academy

Literature

- "Ba. Bha. Borkar: Vyakti and Vangmay" – Manohar Hirba Sardessai 1992, Gomantak Marathi Academy, Panaji
- "Mandovi"- Kavivarya Ba.Bha. Borkar 60th birthday special issue, 1970, Editor: Shriram Pandurang Kamat, Goa.

== Awards ==
- 1934 – Gold Medal Marathi Sahitya Samellan for Poetry
- 1950 – Gold Medal Gomantak Marathi Sahitya Samellan for Novel "Bhavin"
- 1950 – President – Konkani Sahitya Samellan
- 1957– President – MarathiKavi Samellan, Solapur
- 1961-President – Tagore Centinary Sahitya Shakha
- 1956 -President – Gomantak Marathi Sahitya Samellan
- 1963-President Sahityakar Sansad, Allahabad
- 1964–1970 – President- Institute Menezes Braganza, Panaji, Goa
- 1963 – Member of the Sahitik Shistamandal to Sri Lanka
- 1967 – Padmashri – Government of India
- 1968 – President – Akhil Bharatiya Konkani Parishad
- 1970– President-Second Marathi Sahitya Parishad's Sahitya Samellan, Mahabaleshwar
- 1970-President- 20th Mumbai Subarban Sahitya Samellan
- 1970 – President- 72 nd Annual Function of Mumbai Marathi Granthasangralaya
