= Konkani literature =

Written works in the Konkani language

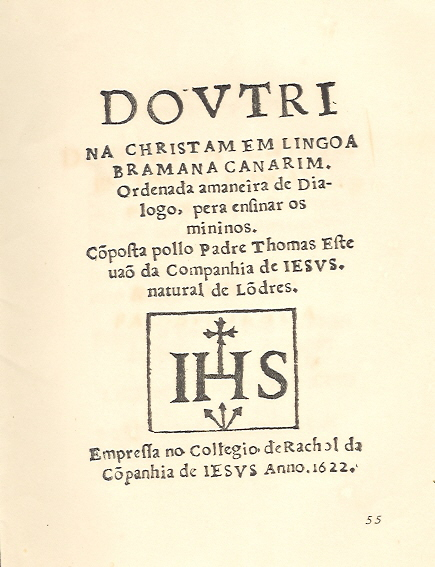
Cover of Dovtrina Christam by Fr. Thomas Stephens, first published work in Konkani, and any Indian language

Konkani literature is literature in the Konkani language, mostly produced in three scripts: Roman, Devanagari and Kannada. Konkani literature is eligible for the Sahitya Akademi Award.

== History ==
While the earliest inscriptions in Konkani date from around the end of the first millennium, the first writer in the history of Konkani language known to us today is Shamaraja; who was also known as Krishnadas Shama as he was an ardent devotee of Lord Krishna. He was born in the 15th century AD in the village of Quelossim in Goa. As per the date mentioned in his Shrikrishnacharitrakatha, he began writing his book on 13th of the Vaishakha month of the Hindu lunar calendar, which is 25 April 1526, according to the Gregorian calendar. He authored Ramayana, Mahabharata, and Krishnacharitrakatha in prose style. The manuscripts have not been found, although transliterations in Roman script are found in Braga in Portugal. The script used by him for his work still remains a mystery.

According to the orders of the Goa Inquisition, which commenced in 1560, it was an offence to remain in possession of books in local languages. All books, whatever their subject matter, written in Konkani, Marathi, or Sanskrit, were seized by the inquisition and burnt on the suspicion that they might deal with idolatry. It is probable that valuable non-religious literature dealing with art, literature, and sciences were destroyed indiscriminately as a consequence. For instance, even before the inquisition orders, in a letter dated 24 November 1548, Fr. Joao de Albuquerque proudly reports his achievement in this direction. Vishnudas Nama who also used pen names like Vaishampayana and Parameshvaraco Sharanagat Nama, authored Bhishmaparva and Adiparva, transliterations of which are found in the public library of Braga in northern Portugal. Another copy of Ramayana does not bear any author's name, although the name of a certain "Sadashiva" has been mentioned.

The Jesuits established the first printing press in Asia in Goa in 1556. The first known printed book in Konkani was written by an English Jesuit priest, Fr. Thomas Stephens in 1622, and entitled Doutrina Christam em Lingoa Bramana Canarim (Old Portuguese for: Christian Doctrine in the Canarese Brahman Language). The first book exclusively on Konkani grammar, Arte da Lingoa Canarim, was printed in 1640 by Father Stephens in Portuguese. Similarly, a book named A Konkani Grammar, was printed in the year 1882 in Mangalore by Angelo Francesco Saverio Maffei, and describes Canara Konkani grammar.

The late nineteenth century saw the emergence of Konkani as a modern literary language, particularly through the pioneering work of the Goan writers Shenoi Goembab (1877–1946) and later Ravindra Kelekar (1925–2010), who wrote some of the twentieth century's foremost Konkani literature. Alongside these writers, a wave of pulp fiction began around the 1930s, with writers including Caridade Damaciano Fernandes, Reginald Fernandes, and Eliot Ely. The first Konkani novel to be translated into English was the 1977 Acchev by Pundalik Naik (1952–).

== Konkani writers ==
Name	Dates	Principal language(s)	Principal forms	Notes
Uday Bhembré		Konkani	short stories, plays	
Caridade Damaciano Fernandes	1904–1948	Konkani	novels	A pioneering prose fiction writer in Konkani.
Shenoi Goembab	1877–1946	Konkani	prose fiction, translations	
Olivinho Gomes	1943–2009	Konkani, Portuguese, English	poetry, translations and criticism	
Ravindra Kelekar	1925–2010	Konkani	prose fiction	
Damodar Mauzo	1944-	Konkani	fiction	
Pundalik Naik	1952-	Konkani	novels and plays	Wrote the first Konkani novel to be translated into English.
R. V. Pandit	1917–1990	Marathi, Konkani, Portuguese	poetry	Most celebrated for his vast poetic production in Konkani.
Laxmanrao Sardessai	1904–1986	Marathi, Konkani, Portuguese	poetry	Considered one of Goa's finest Marathi writers.
S. M. Tadkodkar		English, Konkani, Marathi	poetry, research, theory, academics	Author of Goan Christian Marathi Vilapika During The 17th Century (2010); Professor and Head, Department of Postgraduate Instruction and Research in Marathi, Goa University.

== See also ==
- Goan literature
