= Kala Academy =

Cultural centre in Goa, India

Coordinates: 15.4942839°N 73.8176938°E

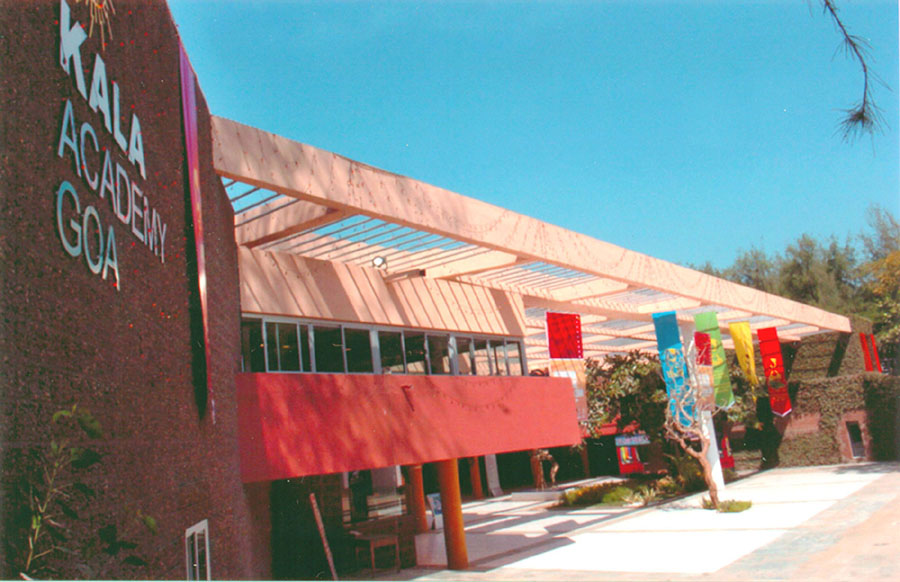
Kala Academy, Goa, 2004.

Kala Academy, Goa (Academy of the Arts, Goa) is a prominent cultural centre located at Campal in Panjim, Goa. Established on 28th February 1970 by the Government of Goa, the academy serves as an apex body to promote and develop music, dance, drama, fine art, folk art, literature. The building was designed by Charles Correa.

== Overview ==
Kala Academy is funded by the Government of Goa, and is functioning under its Directorate of Arts & Culture. The centre offers training through its faculty, and also organises festivals, competitions, exhibitions, workshops, seminars, and other programmes related to various forms of the local arts. It has a General Council of 28 members, a 14-member Executive Board, and advisory committees for various sections. In August 29, the government of Goa said the structure could not be repaired or renovated and might have to be demolished.

It houses the Faculty of Indian Music and Dance, Department of Western Music, School of Drama (estb in 1987), Rangamel, the Repertory Company of Kala Academy (estb. 1992) and College of Theatre Arts. Besides an auditorium (Dinanath Mangeshkar Kala Mandir), amphitheatre, black box theatre, art gallery and library. Goa Music College situated at Altinho was established by the Kala Academy in 1987. However, the college was later 1994 affiliated to Goa University.

== Faculty of Indian Music and Dance ==
Faculty of Indian Music and Dance was established in 1972. It was set up to train the students by imparting the education of Indian Classical Music in Guru-Shishya Parampara. Pt. Ratnakant Ramnathkar was the first Director. He composed many Bandishi's titled "Premrang" which were later popularised by his disciple Pt. Jitendra Abhisheki. The Academy offers various courses including Vocal, Harmonium, Tabla, Sitar, Kathak and Bharatnatyam. The training is provided for the period of 12 years. Currently, the department is headed by the Director, Dr. Sapana Naik.

The students receive the training from the noted artists across various disciplines:

- Tabla: Shailesh Gaonkar is a lecturer of Tabla. Dayanidhesh Kossambe is a notable Tabla player and a senior tabla accompanist. Pt. Yeshwantrao Kerkar also previously served as an instructor.
- Vocal: The training is provided in Hindustani Classical music. Rupesh Gawas is a senior vocal teacher. Sachin Teli is also a lecturer in Vocal.
- Harmonium: Subhash Fatarpekar is a senior harmonium teacher. He has performed at National and International levels and provided accompaniment to renowned artists across India. He was trained under Late Nirmala Pai Kakode who produced several artists.
- Kathak: Varada Bedekar is a lecturer of Kathak Dance. She has been recognised in "A grade" category by the Doordarshan Mumbai.
- Bharatnatyam: Dr. Sapana Naik and Mandira Tirodkar are lecturers in Bharatnatyam.

Kala Academy also operates Rural Music Centers in remote areas like Pernem, Sanquelim, Valpoi, Sanguem, Quepem, and Canacona to offer courses of Harmonium, Tabla and Vocal.

== Department of Western Music ==
Department of Western Music was established by the Portuguese government in 1952 in order to impart knowledge of Western Classical Music and it was later merged with the Kala Academy in 1971.

== Gallery ==
Kala Academy, Panjim
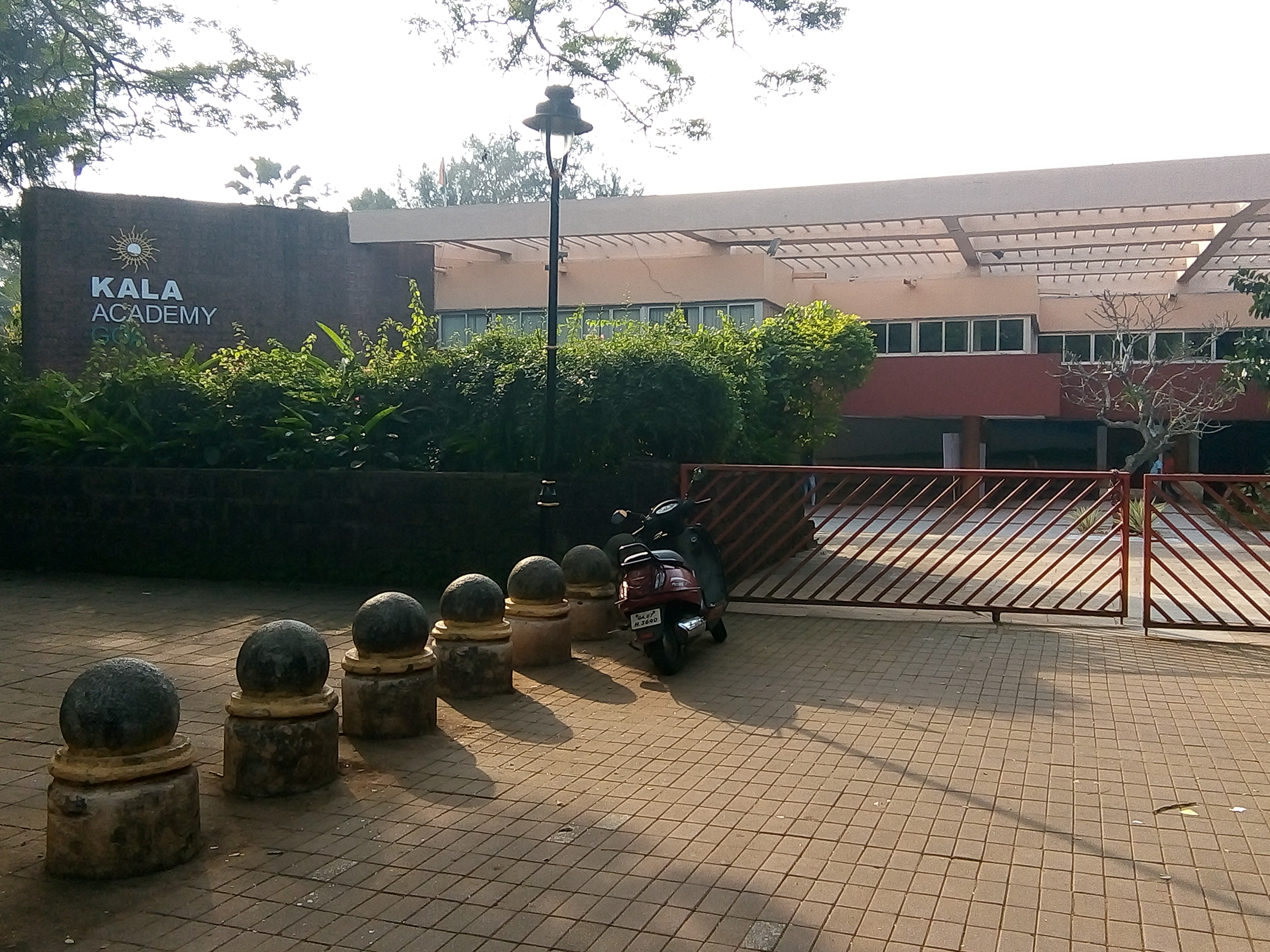
Exterior

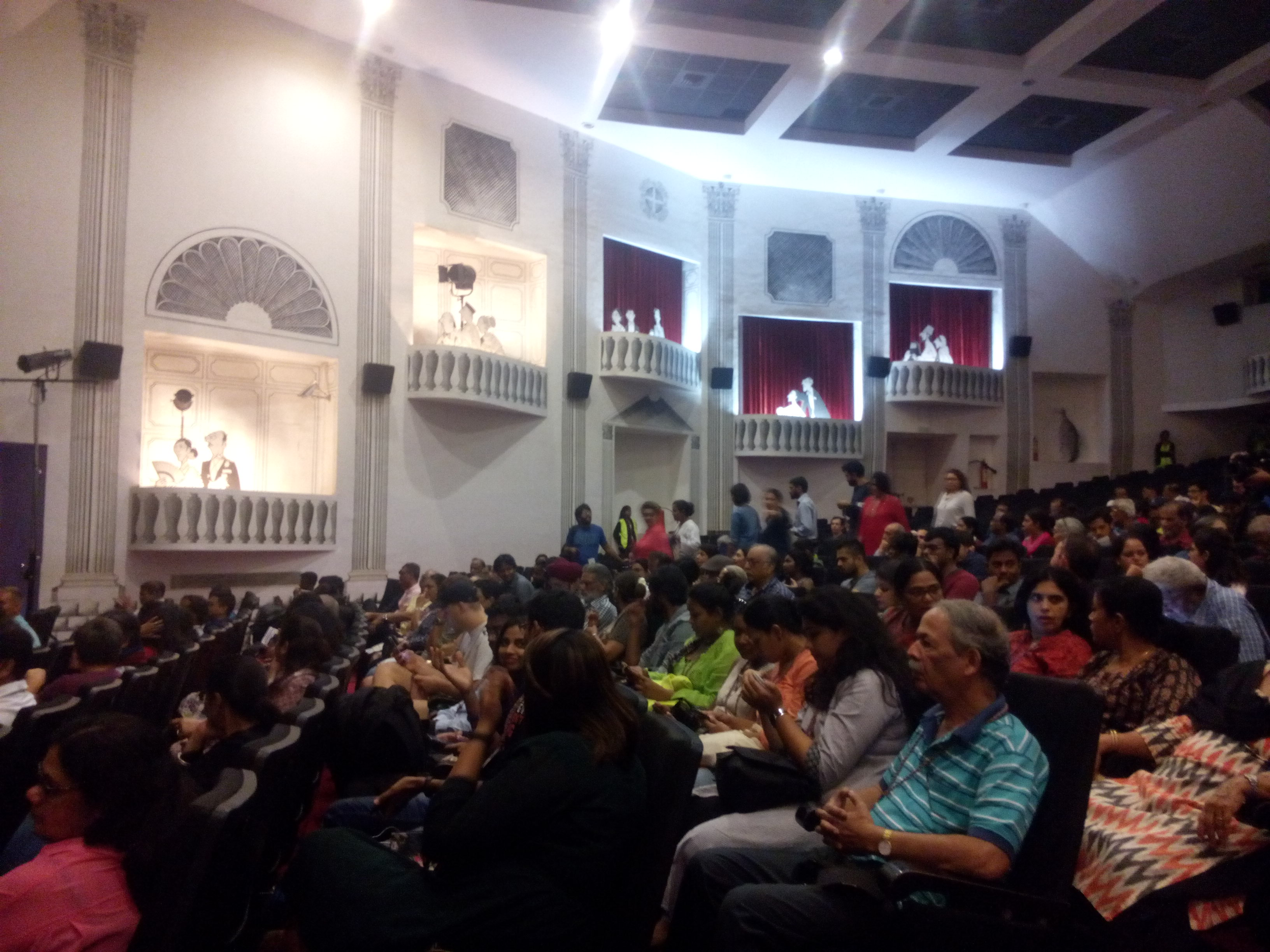
Interior of the main auditorium

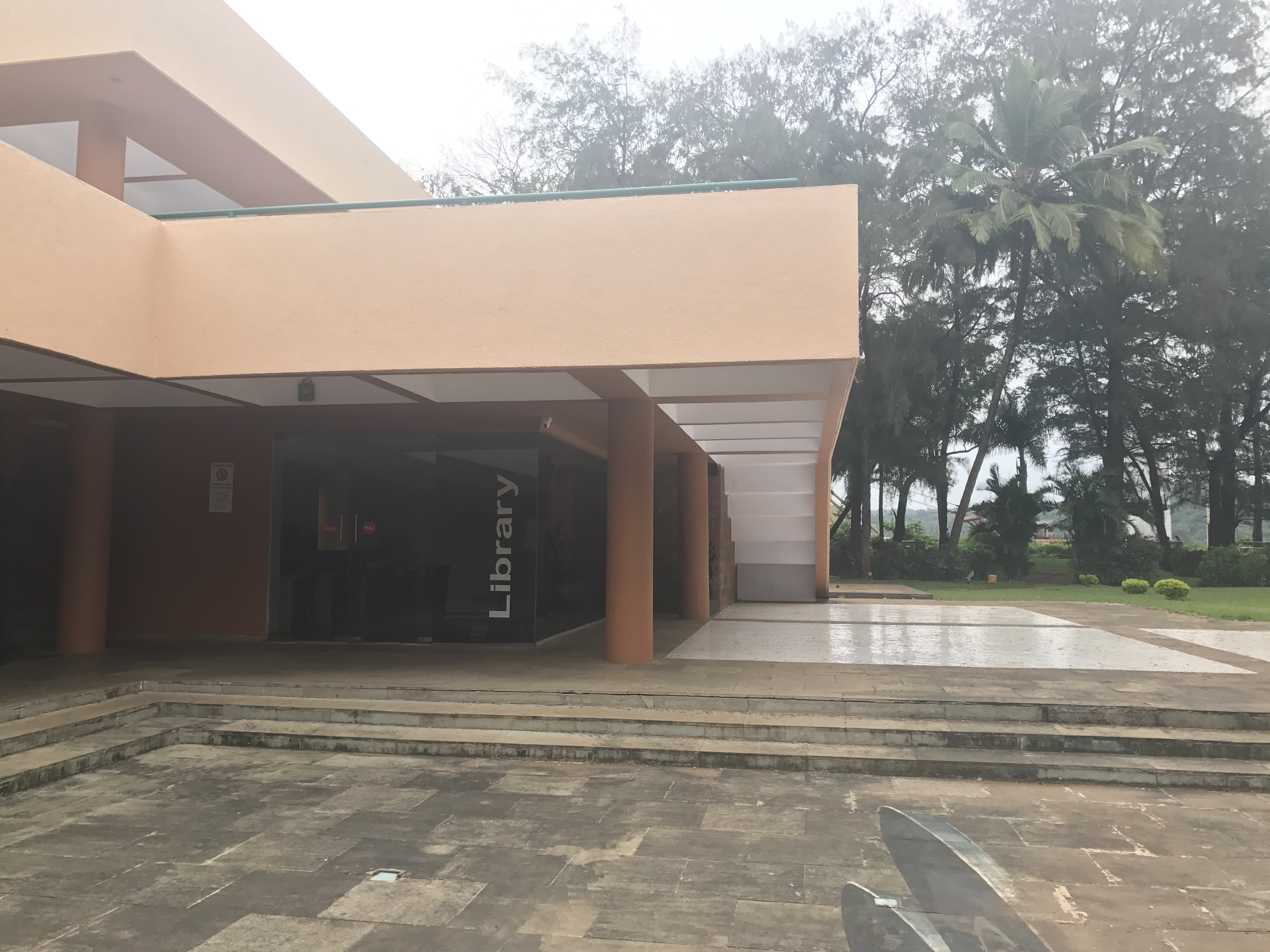
Exterior of the academy library

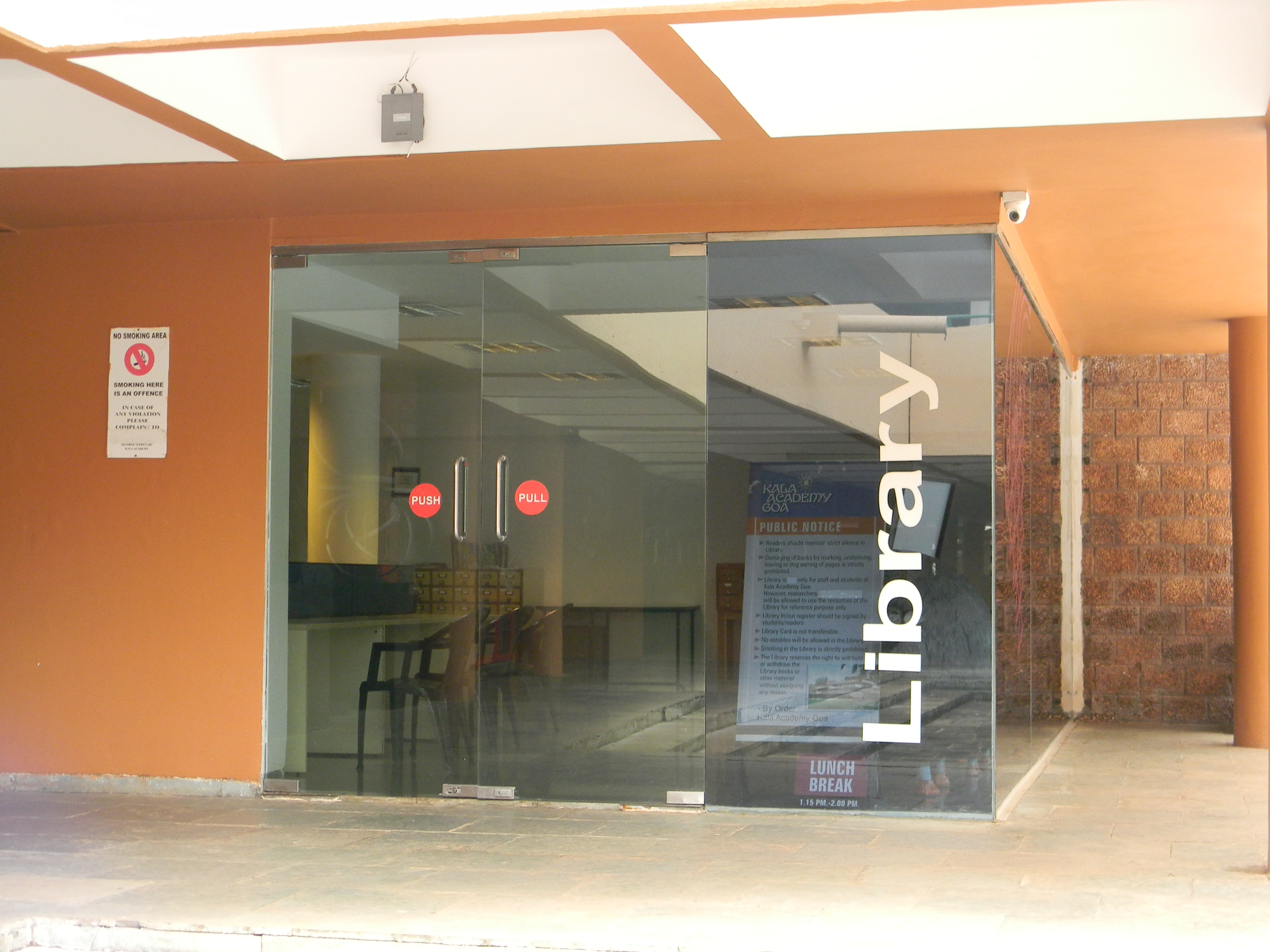
Entrance to the academy library
