= Konkani Bhasha Mandal =

Indian non-profit organisation for Konkani language

- Abbreviation: KBM
- Formation: 30 September 1962; 64 years ago
- Type: Nonprofit organization
- Location: Margao, Goa, India
- Website: konkanibhashamandal

Konkani Bhasha Mandal (KBM) is a Goa-based non-profit cultural and literary organisation devoted to the promotion, preservation and development of the Konkani language. Established to advance linguistic and cultural identity among Konkani speakers, it engages in educational, literary, artistic and social outreach activities across Goa. The organisation was founded on 30 September 1962 in Margao (Madgaon), which serves as its headquarters, with Pedro Curais Afonso serving as the founding president.

== History and administration ==
The Konkani Bhasha Mandal was formally registered under the Registration of Societies Act on 30 March 1963. The organisation's jurisdiction covers the Goa region, and it maintains an office in Panaji in addition to its headquarters in Margao.

The Mandal is governed by a working committee elected for a two-year term. This committee consists of office bearers—including a President, Vice-President, General Secretary, Joint Secretaries, and a Treasurer—and members representing the eleven mahals (districts) of Goa. Membership is open to individuals over the age of eighteen who subscribe to the organisation's objectives, with categories for patrons ("givers of gifts"), life members, and annual members.

== Activities and initiatives ==
Konkani Bhasha Mandal has played a central role in promoting Konkani through literature, education and performing arts. The organisation regularly hosts events that celebrate Goan culture and music, encouraging artists and youth to use melody and performance as a medium to popularise the language. Its cultural programmes aim to connect communities through Konkani, fostering linguistic pride and inclusion across generations.

The Mandal observes "Konkani Day" annually on 9 April to commemorate the death anniversary of Shenoi Goembab. Additionally, it organizes the Bakibaba Memorial Poetry Festival and holds annual poetry competitions to encourage aspiring writers.

=== Education ===
In collaboration with educational institutions, the Mandal manages an English medium high school, the Ravindra Kelekar Dnyanamandir, in Margao, which marked a decade of operation in 2022. The school is known for providing improved learning facilities such as air-coolers and drinking water systems. It is named after Ravindra Kelekar.

Historically, the Board has emphasized primary education in the vernacular, running a Konkani primary school in Margao and developing textbooks and supplementary reading materials for both primary and secondary levels. To support educators, the organisation runs a training course known as the "Konkani Teacher's Charter".

=== Publishing and literature ===
The organisation has also been involved in translation and publishing efforts to expand the availability of Konkani literature. A notable initiative includes the plan to translate 100 books into Konkani and distribute them free of cost, promoting reading culture among younger audiences.

It publishes a special annual issue of its monthly periodical featuring works by both established and emerging writers. The Mandal is also responsible for editing and publishing dictionaries and glossaries to aid language learning.

The KBM organizes the biennial All India Konkani Writers’ Conference and is affiliated with the All India Konkani Sahitya Parishad, having hosted several sessions of the Parishad's conferences.

== Leadership ==
Serafino Cota is currently serving as the President.

== Funding and support ==
In 2025, Datta Damodar Naik, a Margao-based businessman, donated ₹1 crore to the Konkani Bhasha Mandal, establishing a permanent corpus fund for the organisation’s cultural and educational activities. The endowment is intended to sustain long-term projects that enhance the reach of Konkani language initiatives.

== Cultural impact ==
Konkani Bhasha Mandal has been described as one of the most influential organisations dedicated to preserving the linguistic heritage of Goa. Through its work in education, literature, and the arts, it continues to nurture a generation of Konkani speakers and creative practitioners who engage with their language in diverse, contemporary ways. The organisation is also credited with conducting fundamental work in the field of linguistic research and supports the arts to further the development of Konkani culture.
