= Konkani =

Konkani may refer to:

== Language ==
- Konkani language is an Indo-Aryan language spoken in the Konkan region of India.
- Konkani alphabets, different scripts used to write the language
  - Konkani in the Roman script, one of the scripts used to write the language
- Konkani phonology
- Konkani language agitation, historic agitations in support of the language in Goa, India
- Maharashtrian Konkani, a dialect of the Konkani language spoken in Maharashtra, India
- Marathi-Konkani languages, Indic languages of Maharashtra and Konkan, including Marathi and Konkani

== Ethnic groups ==
- Konkani people, south-western India
  - Konkani Muslims
- People of the Konkan Division, in Konkan Division, Maharashtra, India

== See also ==
- Konkan (disambiguation)
- Kokna language (disambiguation)
- Konkani literature
- Konkani liturgical music
- Konkani Wikipedia, Konkani-language edition of Wikipedia
