= Kankan (disambiguation) =

Kankan is a city in Guinea.

Kankan may also refer to:

- Kankan (rapper) (born 2000), American rapper and record producer
- Kankan, Iran, village in Iran
- Kankan Region, region in Guinea
- Kankan Prefecture, prefecture in the Kankan Region in Guinea

== See also ==
- Konkan (disambiguation)
- Kankanaey (disambiguation)
- Kankana, a ribbon tied around the wrist in the Hindu wedding ritual of Kankana Dharane
- Kankana Banerjee, Indian classical singer
- Kankana Sen Sharma, Indian actress
- Kankanadi, commercial and residential locality in Karnataka, India
- Kankana Wadi, village in Karnataka, India
- Kankanala Palli, village in Andhra Pradesh, India
