= Karnataka Konkani Sahitya Academy =

Kokani language promotion organization in Karnataka, India

Karnataka Konkani Sahitya Academy is formed in the Indian state of Karnataka to promote Konkani language and literature. This organisation is funded every year through the Budget of Karnataka Government.

This organisation conducts several events including Konkani Lokotsav, once every year.

== See also ==
- Konkani language agitation
