= Felicio Cardozo =

Indian journalist and author (1932–2004)

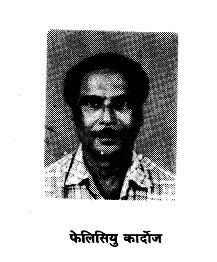
- Born: Felicio Xavier Esperdiao Caetano de Rosa Cardozo; 30 August 1932; Seraulim, Portuguese Goa
- Died: 17 May 2004 (aged 71); Haveri, Karnataka, India
- Occupation: Journalist
- Movement: Goan independence movement; Konkani language agitation
- Awards: Tamra Patra

Felicio Xavier Esperdiao Caetano de Rosa Cardozo (30 August 1932 – 17 May 2004) was an Indian independence activist, author, journalist, and educator from Goa. He actively participated in the Goan independence movement and later contributed significantly to Konkani literature and journalism.

== Early life and education ==
Cardozo was born on 30 August 1932 in Seraulim, Salcete, to a farming family. His parents were Inocencio Sebastiao Cardozo and Maria Ida de Piedade Mergulhao. He completed his primary education in the Portuguese medium in Suravali. He subsequently attended the Portuguese Lyceum, studying at institutions such as the Instituto José Vaz, completing five years of Lyceum education.

His education was interrupted by his involvement in the struggle for Goa's independence. He resumed his academic pursuits much later in life, passing his Secondary School Certificate (S.S.C.) examination in 1976. He went on to graduate with a Bachelor of Science (B.Sc.) degree in 1980.

== Career ==
=== Teaching and administration ===
Cardozo held various professional roles throughout his life. He worked as a translator at the Dabelian office and taught at a private primary school. He also served as a Portuguese teacher at Sri Damodar Vidyabhuvan. Following 1975, he joined Rosary High School in Navelim as a teacher and later served as a higher secondary educator at the same institution. Additionally, he served as a member of the Board of Studies in Konkani.

=== Journalism and writing ===
Cardozo made significant contributions to Konkani journalism, particularly in Konkani in the Roman script. On 15 August 1962, he launched the weekly magazine Goan Saad, acting as its editor and publisher. On 15 August 1963, this publication was converted into a daily newspaper named Sat, which holds the distinction of being the first daily newspaper in Konkani. It remained in circulation until 15 August 1968.

He later established Divati, a Roman script newspaper that combined the publications A Vida and Sat. Although he did not hold the title of editor-in-chief, he managed the editorial responsibilities. Following his tenure at Divati, he launched another weekly titled Loksaad, which ran for one year. Through his various publications, Cardozo sought to reduce the influence of Portuguese syntax on the Konkani language, introducing vocabulary from Marathi and "Niz Konkani" (original Konkani).

Cardozo was also an author and translator. He translated several classic stories into Konkani, including Ali Baba and the Forty Thieves, Taravati Sindbad, and Alauddin and Adbhut Divo. His original literary works include the poetry collections Fulchi Bag, Tuphan, and Nemani Desire. Some of his poetry was recorded for radio broadcast.

== Activism ==
=== Goan independence movement ===
During his student years, Cardozo was inspired to join the Goan independence movement by the broadcasts of activist Janardan Shinkre's Jwala. He utilized creative mediums such as theater and magic shows to raise political awareness among the public. He also wrote articles for Konkani magazines such as Goa, Konkan Times, Golden Goa, and Santos.

In May 1954, Cardozo participated in protests against the visit of a Portuguese minister to Goa. He was arrested on 16 June 1954 and subjected to severe beatings while in custody, resulting in the permanent loss of hearing in one ear. He was imprisoned for three and a half years at Margao and Aguada. During his incarceration, he learned the Devanagari script and studied literature. He was released on 30 January 1958.

=== Post-annexation activism ===
After the Indian annexation of Goa, Cardozo remained active in social and political movements. He campaigned for the preservation of Goa's distinct identity and was involved in the Goa Opinion Poll movement through his writings and speeches. He was an active participant in the official language agitation organized by Konkani Projecho Awaz. Politically, he served two terms as an elected member of the Suravali panchayat.

== Death ==
Cardozo and Freddy J Da Costa, another advocate of Konkani language, died in a car accident near Haveri on 17 May 2004.

== Awards and recognition ==
Cardozo was awarded the Tamra Patra by the Government of India in recognition of his services to the Indian independence movement. He served as the President of the Konkani Bhasha Mandal from 1984 to 1986. In 1969, he visited Russia as a journalist, and returned in 1977 to study the Russian language.

== Legacy ==
Awards for journalists and educationists are distributed in Cardozo's honour every year.

A road in Seraulim was named after him.
