= Kukna =

Kukna or Kokna may refer to:

- A dialect of the Dhodia-Kukna language spoken by the Kokna people
- Kokna, speakers of the Dhodia-Kukna language
- Kukna Ajay Singh, Indian cricketer
- Kokna (river), tributary of the Drawa river in Poland
- Some speakers of Konkani refer to their language as 'Kukna'
