= Vauraddeancho Ixtt =

Vauraddeancho Ixtt (Workers' Friend) is a Goan weekly magazine in Romi Konkani. It has been published continuously since 1933 and is one of the oldest publications in the state.

It was started on 4 January 1933 by Fr Arsencio Fernandes and Fr Graciano Moraes in order to protect poor and less educated workers against communist propaganda that they were being exposed to. The charge later passed on from the diocesan priests to the hands of the Society of Pilar.

Vauraddeancho Ixtt started writing on topics such as the comunidade system and the caste system. It has supported various issues since then like the struggle of Ramponkars in the late 1970s and the early 1980s, land grab, falling employment, environmental degradation, concerns of democratic and human rights violations, food and water scarcity and the failing Public Distribution System.

The weekly played a brave role in the support of Goa's freedom struggle, a role that angered the Portuguese who then imposed clamps on the paper. It played the role of a nationalist newspaper that the Portuguese tried to suppress before the Invasion of Goa. It was initially published in Konkani, Portuguese, and English. Currently, it is mainly in Konkani, with a few columns in English.

Vauraddeancho Ixtt gives away awards every year that are conferred upon Konkani writers and on those who contributed significantly to the Konkani language and to Goan culture. Social activists and young Konkani writers who have been associated with the weekly are also felicitated on the occasion.

According to Google Analytics, the online edition of Vauraddeancho Ixtt is read in over 50 countries. It has a circulation of 15,000 copies in Goa, Mumbai, other parts of India and overseas. In 2010, there was a fresh surge in interest in the magazine as it launched a Facebook page which has become very popular.
