= Konkan (disambiguation) =

Konkan is a region of India.

Konkan may also refer to:

- Konkana kingdom, an ancient Indian kingdom in the region
- Konkan division, one of the six administrative divisions of Maharashtra, India, within the region
- HMIS Konkan (J228), Bangor-class minesweepers built for the Royal Navy, named after the region
- Konkan, Burkina Faso, village in the Sidéradougou Department of Comoé Province

== See also ==
- Konkani (disambiguation)
- Kankan (disambiguation)
- Concan, Texas
- Kon Kan
