= Konkani phonology =

Phonology of the Konkani language of India

Konkani (Note: Disambiguation: Konkani is a name given to a group of several cognate dialects spoken along the narrow strip of land called Konkan, on the west coast of India. This is, however, somewhat an over-generalisation. Geographically, Konkan is defined roughly as the area between the river Damanganga to the north and river Kali to the south, the north–south length being approx. 700 km (430 mi) and east–west breadth about 50 km (31 mi), going to around 100 km (62 mi) in some places. A major part of Konkan is in Maharashtra and most people in the area speak some dialects of Marathi. But the language spoken in Goa and further south in coastal Karnataka and in some parts of northern Kerala has its distinct features, and is rightly identified as a separate language called Konkani and whose phonology is within the purview of this article.) is a southern Indo-Aryan language belonging to the Indo-European family of languages spoken in the Konkan coastal region of India. It has approximately 3.6 million speakers.

Konkani is the official language of the Indian state of Goa and a minority language in the Konkan Division of Maharashtra state, and the Malabar Coast of Karnataka and Kerala states, where Konkani speakers emigrated during the Bahmani, Maratha, and Portuguese conquests. It is also one of the official languages of India.

This article is restricted to Konkani dialects spoken in the states of Goa, Karnataka, and Kerala, where the largest number of Konkani speakers are found.

The Konkani language has 9 oral vowels (each with a nasal counterpart), 36 consonants, 5 semi-vowels, 3 sibilants, 1 aspirate, and many diphthongs.

== Vowels ==
Vowels show a contrast between oral and nasal ones. Different types of nasal vowels are a special feature of the Konkani language.

=== Vowels ===
Vowels
	Front	Central	Back
Close	i ĩ		u ũ
Close-mid	e ẽ	ɵ ɵ̃	o õ
Open-mid	ɛ ɛ̃	ʌ ʌ̃	ɔ ɔ̃
Open	(æ)	a ã	

- One of the most distinguishing features of Konkani phonology is the use of /ɵ/, the close-mid central vowel, instead of the schwa found in Hindustani and Marathi.
- Vowel length is not phonemic in Konkani. Vowels in monosyllables are longer than vowels in polysyllabic words. Vowels are shortened after phonemic aspirates and fricatives.
- Whereas many Indian languages use only one of the three front mid vowels, represented by the Devanagari grapheme ए, Konkani uses three: /e/, /ɛ/ and /æ/.
- Konkani cannot be described as a language with phonemic stress or tone.

== Consonants ==
		Labial	Dental	Alveolar	Retroflex	(Alveolo-) palatal	Velar	Glottal
Nasal	plain	m		n	ɳ	ɲ	ŋ	
Nasal	murmured	mʱ		nʱ	ɳʱ			
Stop/ Affricate	voiceless	p	t	t͡s	ʈ	t͡ɕ	k	
Stop/ Affricate	aspirated	pʰ	tʰ	t͡sʰ	ʈʰ	t͡ɕʰ	kʰ	
Stop/ Affricate	voiced	b	d	d͡z	ɖ	d͡ʑ	ɡ	
Stop/ Affricate	murmured	bʱ	dʱ	d͡zʱ	ɖʱ	d͡ʑʱ	ɡʱ	
Fricative		(f) (Note: /f/ was introduced into Konkani phonology via. Portuguese and largely replaces /pʰ/ in Goan and Mangalorean Christian dialects, however /pʰ/ is still retained in formal speech.)	s			ɕ		h
Approximant	plain	ʋ		l		j		
Approximant	murmured	ʋʱ		lʱ				
Flap/Trill	plain			ɾ	(ɽ)			
Flap/Trill	lateral				𝼈			
Flap/Trill	murmured			ɾʱ				

- The palatal and alveolar stops are affricates. The palatal glides are truly palatal but otherwise the consonants in the palatal column are alveopalatal.
- Phonemic palatalisation is found in all obstruents, except for palatal and alveolars. Where a palatalised alveolar is expected, a palatal is found instead. In the case of glides, only labial glides /ʋ/ and /ʋʱ/ show this contrast, and among the other sonorants, only unaspirated consonants exhibit this.
- In initial position, many speakers substitute unaspirated consonants for aspirates. However, the vowel is shortened after phonemic aspirates and fricatives, preserving the contrast.
- Aspirates in a non-initial position are rare and only occur in careful speech.
- /ɖ/ pronounced [ɽ] except initially or after a consonant.

The consonants in Konkani are similar to those in Marathi.

== Dialects ==
The Goan standard dialect of Konkani, the Antruz dialect, is based on Goan Hindu Konkani which was originally the speech of the Hindus from the Novas Conquistas, (Note: New Conquests: Areas conquered by the Portuguese in the latter half of the eighteenth century) but it is now spoken by Hindus all over Goa with minor variations. It is also spoken by the Christians of the New Conquests who form a small percentage of the Goan Christians. The vast majority of Goan Christians live in areas called the Velhas Conquistas. (Note: Old Conquests: Areas conquered by the Portuguese in the first half of the sixteenth century) Their speech varies considerably from the speech of the Goan Hindus. They also speak two considerably different dialects: Bardes Christian dialect, spoken in Bardes and Tiswadi which form the northern part of the Old Conquests and Saxtti Christian dialect, spoken in Sashti and Mormugao which form the southern part of the Old Conquests. However, these two dialects have certain common features which can be referred to as Goan Christian Konkani features. The major Konkani dialects of Karnataka are the Saraswat dialect, spoken by the Saraswat Brahmins of the coastal districts of Karnataka, and Karnataka Christian dialect, spoken by Christians in the coastal districts of Karnataka. The Saraswats and Christians of Karnataka also speak considerably different dialects since they came to Karnataka from different parts of Goa and at different times. The Saraswats came from southern Old Conquests (Sashti and Mormugao) in the sixteenth century because of Portuguese religious persecution. The Christians came in the seventeenth and eighteenth centuries mainly from Bardes and Tiswadi.

=== Writings and Scripts ===
A good number of writings are available in four of the dialects mentioned above: Goa Hindu, Bardes Christian, Canara Christian and Canara Saraswat. The Canara Saraswat dialect includes the speech of the Gaud Saraswats as well as that of the Chitrapur Saraswats as the differences between these two varieties of speech are minor. Sashti Christians generally use the Bardes dialect for writing. The Goan Hindus use the Devanagari script in their writings but the Goan Christians use the Roman script. The Saraswats of Karnataka use the Devanagari script in the North Canara district but the Kannada script in Udupi and South Canara . The Canara Christians use the Kannada script. The Devanagari script has been promulgated as the official script for Konkani in Goa.

=== Vowel Rounding in Christian Dialects ===
In the Christian dialects (Bardes Christian and Saxtti Christian), there are fewer vowel phonemes as the vowel ə has merged with o. See table below:

Bardes Christian	Sashti Christian	Standard Konkani	Glossary
dhor	dhor	dhər	Hold
koḷo	koḷo	kəḷo	Bud

== See also ==
- Konkani script
- Konkani language
- Konkani Language Agitation

Footnotes

Citations
