= Dor Mhoineachi Rotti =

Defunct Konkani periodical

- Frequency: Monthly
- Founder: Fr. Vincent Lobo
- Founded: 1915; 111 years ago
- Language: Konkani language

Dor Mhoineachi Rotti (meaning Our Monthly Bread in English) is the oldest existing periodical in the Konkani language. Launched in 1915, it completed 110 years of publication in 2025, after shifting it home from Karachi to Bombay to Goa, from where it is currently published. It is a religious publication.

== History ==
The magazine was initially named Dor Muineachi Rotti Povitra Jesucha Calzachem Devoçãõ Vaddounchi (The Monthly Bread, To Extend Devotion to the Sacred Heart of Jesus). Fr. Vincent Lobo, from Sangolda in Goa, curator at the St. Patrick's Church in Karachi, began it in 1915, to cater to the large number of Konkani-speaking people there, as there was no other Konkani spiritual literature.

Its stated intention is to spread the devotion to the Christian idea of the Sacred Heart of Jesus; The name was changed subsequently to Dor Muiniachi Rotti, Concanim Messenger of the Sacred Heart.

== Others at the helm ==
On Fr. Vincent Lobo's death on 11 November 1922, Fr. António Ludovico Pereira, also from Sangolda, took over. Dor Mhoineachi Rotti had an estimated readership of around 12,000. After the death of Fr. António Ludovico Pereira on 26 July 1936, Fr. Antanasio Moniz, from Verna, took over.

On his death in 1953, Fr. Elias D'Souza, from Bodiem, Tivim in Goa became the fourth editor. After moving to Velha Goa in Goa in 1964, Fr. Moreno de Souza was editor for around 42 years. Later it was edited by Fr. Vasco do Rego SJ.

The Dor Mhuineachi Rotti is owned by the Jesuits in Goa, edited and printed and published by Fr. Kelvin Monteiro, S.J. on behalf of the Provincial Superior of the Jesuits in Goa. The magazine is published on a monthly basis. Monteiro has been printer and publisher of the monthly since 2009.
