= Kankanawadi =

Village in Karnataka, India

- Village
- Location in Karnataka, India Kankanawadi (India)
- Coordinates: 16.48°N 74.78°E
- Country: India
- State: Karnataka
- District: Belgaum
- Talukas: Raybag

Population (2001)
  - Total: 13,303

Languages
  - Official: Kannada
- Time zone: UTC+5:30 (IST)

Kankanawadi is a village in the northern state of Karnataka, India. It is located in the Raybag taluk of Belagavi district in Karnataka.

Kankanavadi is located in Raibag taluk of Belgaum district in the state of Karnataka. Kankanavadi was upgraded from a Gram Panchayat to a Town Panchayat in 2015-16. As per the 2011 census, the population of Kankanavadi is 16318 and the area is 34.13 km². The urban area covers 3800 properties. Kankanavadi water body has a total of 4 OHT tanks, borewells and 3 pure drinking water units.

== Demographics ==
As of 2001 India census, Kankanawadi had a population of 13303 with 6760 males and 6543 females.

== See also ==
- Belagavi
- Districts of Karnataka
