= Konkani in the Roman script =

Form of traditional written language

Konkani in the Roman script, commonly known as Roman Konkani or Romi Konknni (Goan Konkani: रोमी कोंक्णी, Rōmī Kōṅkṇī) refers to the writing of the Konkani language in the Roman script. While Konkani is written in five different scripts altogether, Roman Konkani is widely used. Roman Konkani is known to be the oldest preserved and protected literary tradition beginning from the 16th century AD.

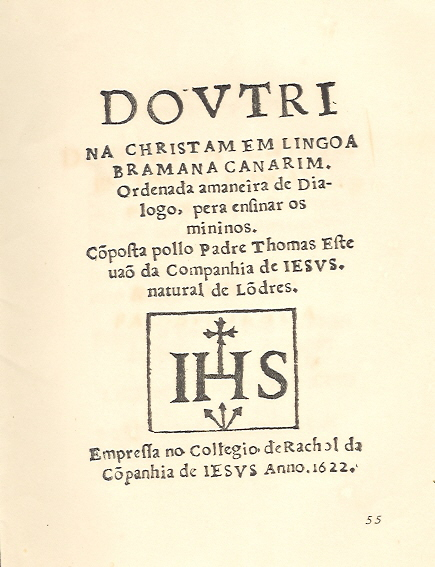
Cover of the Doutrina Christam by Fr. Thomas Stephens, the first published work in Roman Konkani and any other Indian language.

An estimated 500,000 people use Roman Konkani. The use of Devanagari script for Konkani, which is now its official script, first occurred in AD 1187. Roman Konkani was not mandated as official script by law, for decades even after the Konkani language agitation through the 1960s to 1980s. However in 2013, an ordinance passed by the Government of Goa allows the use of the Roman script alongside Devanagari Konkani and Marathi for official communication.

The terms 'Konkani in the Roman script' and 'Roman Konkani' do not merely refer to the fact that the language is written in the Roman script, but they also refer to the dialects traditionally written in this script, namely, the Bardesi (Bardes) and Saxtti (Salcette) variants as opposed to the Antruzi (Ponda) dialect written in Devanagari.

== History ==
In the 16th century, Christian missionaries studied the Konkani language in depth. They even prepared Konkani grammar, dictionaries and studied various facets of literature. The Jesuits established the first printing press in Asia in Goa in 1556. Since then, a rich tradition of Konkani literature in the Roman script has developed. Fr. Thomas Stephens made vital contributions to the development of Roman Konkani orthography in the early 1600s. Fr. Eduardo Bruno de Souza launched the first Roman Konkani monthly titled Udentechem Salok (Lotus of The East) in 1889, in Pune. He also wrote the first Konkani novel, Kristanv Ghorabo (Christian Home). Shenoi Goembab wrote seven Konkani books in the Roman script. Konkani literature was dominated by the Roman script before 1961. Reginaldo Fernandes (1914–1994) wrote over 200 Konkani novels in the Roman script called Romanses.

Today, Konkani in the Roman script is mainly used by the Christian community because the liturgy of the Catholic Church in Goa is entirely in the Roman script and the work of the Archdiocese of Goa and Daman is also carried out in the Roman script. However, many writers outside the Christian Community also write in Roman Konkani. Konkani in the Roman script is also used in tiatr.

There are a huge number of people who solely or primarily use the Roman script. As a result of the recognition of only the Devanagari script, the rich body of Konkani literature written in the Roman script goes unrecognized, unpromoted and unrewarded. When the Sahitya Akademi recognized Konkani in 1975 as an independent and literary language, one of the important factors was the well-preserved literary heritage of Roman Konkani. After Konkani in the Devanagari script was made the official language of Goa in 1987, the Sahitya Akademi supported only writers in the Devanagari script and writers in the Roman script (as also in the Kannada script) are not eligible for the Sahitya Akademi awards and assistance.

== Movement for official recognition of Roman Konkani ==
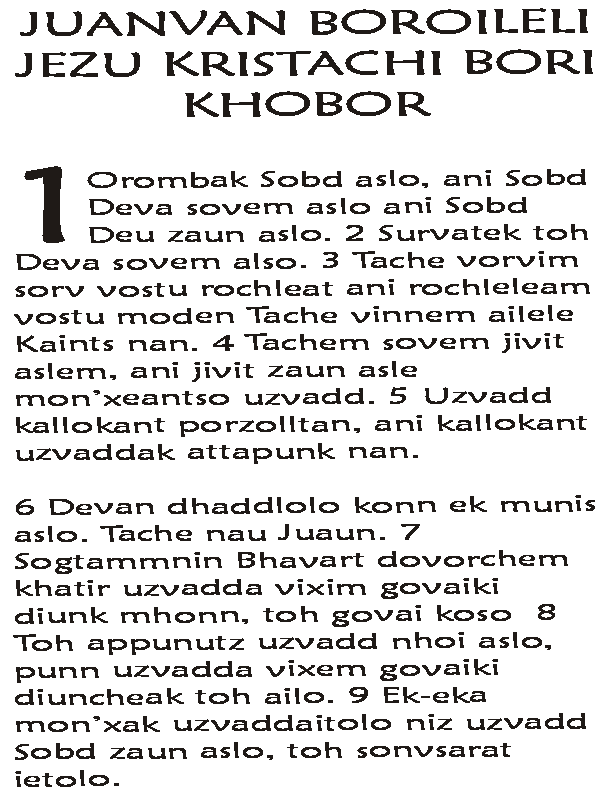
Opening verses in the "Prologue" of the Gospel of John in Roman Konkani. Goan Catholics employ the Latin-script alphabet for their religious and secular writings in the Konkani language

Recently, there has been a renewed surge in the support for Roman Konkani and in the demand for official recognition for the Roman script alongside the Devanagari script. Some examples of this are the growing online readership for Vauraddeancho Ixtt and several groups and pages on social networking website Facebook in support of Romi Konkani. The critics of sole recognition of Devanagari script contend that Antruz dialect is unintelligible to most Goans, let alone other Konkanis, and that Devanagari is used very little as compared to Roman script in Goa or Kannada script in coastal Karnataka Prominent among the critics are Konkani Catholics in Goa, who have been at the forefront of the Konkani language agitation in 1986–1987 and have for long used the Roman script including producing literature in Roman script. They are demanding that Roman script be given equal status to Devanagari. Tiatr artists and tiatr aficionados are another group which supports Romi Konkani. It is argued that giving official recognition to Roman Konkani will help strengthen the language by creating an inclusive environment for users of the Roman script and also to the native Christian majority of Goans. It will avoid people who have difficulty in using the Devanagari script or do not know the Devanagari script from feeling alienated and giving up on the language. Goans who do not know Devanagari are unable to communicate with the state government in their own language and are forced to use English instead, contributing to the decline of Konkani. The Roman script is widely used for Konkani on the internet. It is also the most convenient script for use with computers.

There have been three state-level literary and cultural conventions of Konkani in the Roman script (Romi Lipi Konkani Sahitya ani Sonvskrutik Sommelan) held in 2008, February 2010 and February 2011 in Goa.

However, the criticism against official recognition of Konkani in the Roman script is that having more than one official script for Konkani will lead to fragmentation of the language.

In January 2013, the Goa Bench of the Bombay High Court issued a notice to the state government on a Public Interest Litigation filed by the Romi Lipi Action Front seeking to amend the Official Language Act to grant official language status to Roman Konkani.

In 2016, the Goa Su-Raj Party announced in its manifesto for the 2017 assembly elections that it supports official status for Roman Konkani.

=== Official responses to the demands ===
In September 2008, the advisory board of the Official Language Cell of the Government of Goa recommended the use of Konkani in Roman script in government offices. As per the recommendation, Konkani in the Roman script would be permitted for communication purposes, and government employees may submit applications, appeals or representations and receive orders or notices in Roman script. At present, this is only possible in Konkani in Devanagari script and in Marathi. However, this recommendation has not yet been implemented.

In August 2012, Chief Minister of Goa, Manohar Parrikar announced that he would fulfill four demands of the DKA:

- Goa Kala Academy to introduce Roman Konkani as a separate category in its book publishing scheme with a yearly prize for best literature in Roman Konkani at par with Devanagari
- Roman Konkani to be introduced in schools from Std. 1 to 12
- A theater in Panjim exclusively for staging tiatrs
- Office space for Dalgado Konknni Akademi

=== Organizations ===
Some organizations that promote and support Romi Konkani are:

- Thomas Stephens Konknni Kendr
- Dalgado Konkani Academy
- Goa Konkani Akademi
- Fr. Freddy J. Da Costa Memorial trust
- Felicio Cardozo-che Pattlavdar

=== Publications ===
Some periodicals in Konkani written in the Roman script in continuous publication are:

- Dor Mhoineachi Rotti, since 1915
- Vauraddeancho Ixtt, since 1933
- Gulab, since 1983

== Letters ==
A	Ã	B	C	Ç	D	E	Ẽ	F	G	H	I	Ĩ	J	K	L	M	N	Ñ	O	Õ	P	Q	R	S	T	U	V	W	X	Y	Z
a	ã	b	c	ç	d	e	ẽ	f	g	h	i	ĩ	j	k	l	m	n	ñ	o	õ	p	q	r	s	t	u	v	w	x	y	z

== See also ==
- Literature of Goan Catholics
- Goan Catholics
- East Indian dialect
