= Kankana Dharane =

Hindu wedding ritual

After the blessings of the elders have been received, the bride and the bridegroom each ties a sanctified thread around the wrist of the other. This ceremony is known as Kankana Dharane and signifies that they have vowed to perform the rituals in the manner prescribed by the Shastras.

The next ritual is Khasa Pada Puje.
