= Kankanaey =

Kankanaey, or Kankanay, may be:

- Kankanaey people, an indigenous people of the Philippines, part of the Igorot
- Kankanaey language, their Austronesian (Cordilleran) language
