= Kankanalapalli =

- village
- Interactive map of Kankanalapalli
- Location in Andhra Pradesh, India Kankanalapalli (India)
- Coordinates: 16°24′53″N 80°07′46″E
- Country: India
- State: Andhra Pradesh
- District: Palnadu

Languages
  - Official: Telugu
- Time zone: UTC+5:30 (IST)
- Zip: 522403

Kankanalapalli (or Kankanala Palle) (Village ID 590031) is a village in Sattenapalli mandal, Palnadu district in the state of Andhra Pradesh, India. According to the 2011 census it has a population of 3460 living in 923 households.

Most residents are farmers who do cultivation of chili, cotton, and paddy.

Rail - The nearest Railway station Sattenapalli.

Temples: Sri Brahmamgari temple & Sri Veeranjaneya Swamy temple

President (sarpanch): Kobbari subbarao

MPTC : Patcha Sudheer
