= Konkani language =

Indo-Aryan language spoken in India

Konkani
- कोंकणी; Konknni; ಕೊಂಕಣಿ; കൊങ്കണി; کونکنی
- The word "Konkani" written in the official script of Devanagari
- Pronunciation: [kõkɳi]
- Native to: India
- Region: Southern and Western India (Konkan region): Goa; coastal areas of Karnataka, Maharashtra and some parts of Kerala; Gujarat (in the Dang district); Dadra and Nagar Haveli and Daman and Diu
- Ethnicity: Konkani
- Native speakers: (5.9 million cited 2000–2011)
- Language family: Indo-European: Indo-Iranian; Indo-Aryan; Southern Zone; Marathi–Konkani; Konkani
- Dialects: Dialect groups: Karnataka Konkani, Goan Konkani, Maharashtrian Konkani, Kerala Konkani; Individual dialects: Dangi, Malvani, Chitpavani, Antruz, Bardeskari, Saxtti, Nawayati, Mangalorean Catholic, Southern Saraswat, Daldi (Nakhuda dialect), Pednekari, Koli and Aagri
- Writing system: Present; Devanagari script (Balbodh, official); Latin script (Note: Roman script is not mandated as an official script by law. However, an ordinance passed by the government of Goa allows the use of Roman script for official communication. This ordinance has been put into effect by various ministries in varying degrees. For example, the 1996 Goa Panchayat Rules stipulate that the various forms used in the election process must be in both the Roman and Devanagari script. "Panchayat Raj Act And Rules" (PDF). panchayatsgoa.gov.in. 1996. Archived (PDF) from the original on 10 June 2022.); Kannada script (Note: The use of Kannada script is not mandated by any law or ordinance. However, in the state of Karnataka, Konkani is used in the Kannada script instead of the Devanagari script.); Malayalam script; Perso-Arabic script; Past; Nāgarī; Goykanadi; Modi script

Official status
- Official language in: India; Goa
- Regulated by: Karnataka Konkani Sahitya Academy and the Government of Goa

Language codes
- ISO 639-2: kok
- ISO 639-3: kok – inclusive code Individual codes: gom – Goan Konkani knn – Maharashtrian Konkani
- Glottolog: goan1235 Goan Konkani konk1267 Konkan Marathi
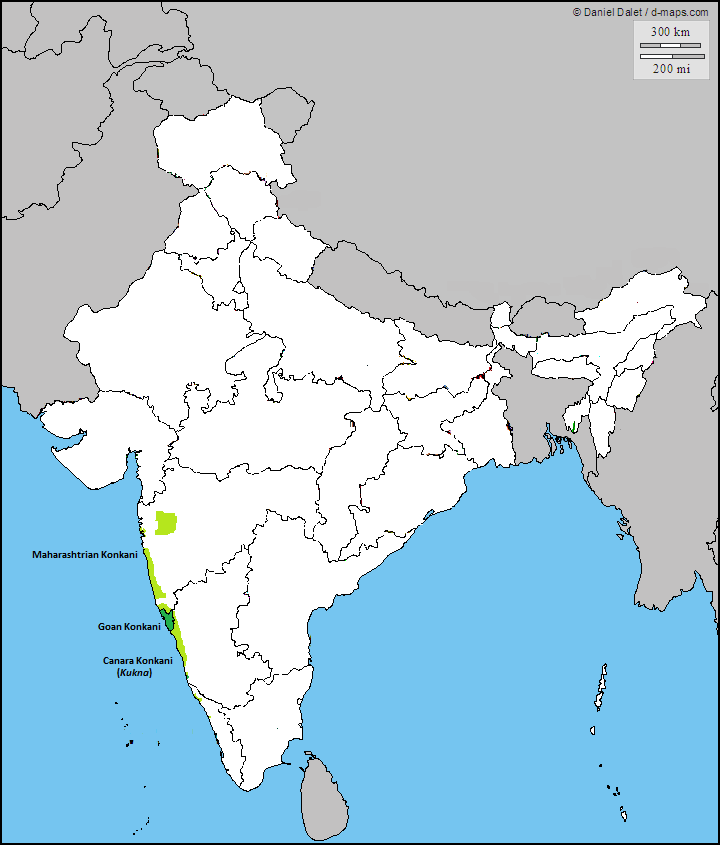
- Distribution of native Konkani speakers in India

Konkani (Note: Konkani is a name given to a group of several cognate dialects spoken along the narrow strip of land called Konkan, on the western coast of India. Geographically, Konkan is defined roughly as the area between the Daman Ganga River to the north and the Kali River to the south; the north–south length is about 650 km and the east–west breadth is about 50 km. The dialect spoken in Goa, coastal Karnataka and in some parts of Northern Kerala has distinct features and is rightly identified as a separate language called Konkani.) (Note: Devanagari: कोंकणी, Romi: Konknni, Kannada: ಕೊಂಕಣಿ, Malayalam: കൊങ്കണി, Nastaliq: کونکنی; IAST: Kōṅkṇī, IPA: [kõkɳi]) (/ˈkɒŋkəni/ KONG-kə-nee), formerly Concani, is an Indo-Aryan language spoken by the Konkani people, primarily in the Konkan region, along the western coast of India. It is one of the 22 scheduled languages mentioned in the Indian Constitution, and the official language of the Indian state of Goa. It is also spoken in Karnataka, Maharashtra, and in some parts of Kerala, Gujarat and Dadra and Nagar Haveli and Daman and Diu.

Konkani is a member of the Southern Indo-Aryan language group. It retains elements of Vedic structures and shows similarities with both Western and Eastern Indo-Aryan languages. The first known Konkani inscription, dated to the 2nd century AD and sometimes claimed as "Old Marathi" is the one at Arvalem; the second oldest Konkani inscription, is one of those at Shravanabelagola, dated to between 981 AD and 1117 AD, it was wrongly touted as "Old Marathi" from the time it was discovered and interpreted. Other Konkani inscriptions are found scattered across the Konkan region, especially from Kurla in Bombay (Mumbai) to Ponda, Goa.

Many Konkani dialects are spoken along and beyond the Konkan region, from Damaon in the north to Karwar in the south; most of which are only partially mutually intelligible with one another due to a lack of linguistic contact and exchanges with the standard and principal forms of Konkani. It is also spoken by migrants outside of the Konkan proper, in Nagpore, Surat, Kochi, Mangalore, Ahmedabad, Karachi, New Delhi, etc. Dialects such as Malvani, Chitpavani, and Damani in Maharashtra are threatened by language assimilation into the linguistic majority of non-Konkani states and territories of India.

== Classification ==
Konkani belongs to the Indo-Aryan language branch. It is part of the Marathi-Konkani group of the southern Indo-Aryan languages. It is inflexive, and less distant from Sanskrit as compared to other modern Indo-Aryan languages. Linguists describe Konkani as a fusion of a variety of Prakrit vernacular languages. This could be attributed to the confluence of immigrants that the Konkan coast has witnessed over the years.

== Names and their etymology ==
It is quite possible that Old Konkani was just referred to as Prakrit by its speakers. Reference to the name Konkani is not found in literature prior to the 13th century. The first reference of the name Konkani is in "Abhanga 263" of the 13th century Hindu Marathi saint poet, Namadeva (1270–1350). Konkani has been known by a variety of names: Canarim, Concanim, Gomantaki, Bramana, and Goani. Learned Marathi speakers tend to call it Gomantaki.

Konkani was commonly referred to as Língua Canarim by the Portuguese and Língua Brahmana by Catholic missionaries. The Portuguese later started referring to Konkani as Língua Concanim. The name Canarim or Língua Canarim, which is how the 16th century European Jesuit Thomas Stephens refers to it in the title of his famous work Arte da lingoa Canarim, has always been intriguing. It is possible that the term is derived from the Persian word for coast, kinara; if so, it would mean "the language of the coast". The problem is that this term overlaps with Kanarese or Kannada. All the European authors, however, recognised two forms of the language in Goa: the plebeian, called Canarim, and the more regular (used by the educated classes), called Língua Canarim Brâmana or simply Brâmana de Goa. The latter was the preferred choice of the Europeans, and also of other castes, for writing, sermons, and religious purposes.

There are different views as to the origin of the word Konkan and hence Konkani:

- V. P. Chavan states that the etymology of Konkan and hence Konkani is derived from the Kannada word konku meaning 'uneven ground'. The Kannada origin suggests that Konkana might have included Kannada territory and 'uneven ground' suggests the hilly nature of the territory. Konku in Kannada also means that which is 'not straight' and is 'crooked'.
- The word Konkan comes from the Kukkana (Kokna) tribe, who were the original inhabitants of the land where Konkani originated.
- According to some texts of Puranas, Parashurama shot his arrow into the sea and commanded the Sea God to recede up to the point where his arrow landed. The new piece of land thus recovered came to be known as Konkan meaning piece of earth or corner of earth, kōṇa (corner) + kaṇa (piece). This legend is mentioned in Sahyadrikhanda of the Skanda Purana.

== History ==
=== Proposed substrate influences ===
The grammatical influence of the Dravidian languages on the structure and syntax of Indo-Aryan languages is difficult to fathom. Some linguists explain this anomaly by arguing that Middle Indo-Aryan and New Indo-Aryan were built on a Dravidian substratum. Some examples of Konkani words of Dravidian origin are: naall (coconut), madval (washerman), choru (cooked rice) and mulo (radish). Linguists also suggest that the substratum of Marathi and Konkani is more closely related to Dravidian Kannada.

=== Prehistory and early development ===
Migrations of Indo-Aryan vernacular speakers have occurred throughout the history of the Indian west coast. Around 1100-700 BC the first wave of Indo-Aryans dialect speakers might have occurred, with the second wave appearing around 700-500 BC. Many spoke old Indo-Aryan vernacular languages, which may be loosely related to Vedic Sanskrit; others still spoke Dravidian and Desi dialects. Thus the ancient Konkani Prakrit was born as a confluence of the Indo-Aryan dialects while accepting many words from Dravidian speech. Some linguists assume Shauraseni to be its progenitor whereas some call it Paisaci. The influence of Paisachi over Konkani can be proved in the findings of Taraporewala, who in his book Elements of Science of Languages (Calcutta University) ascertained that Konkani showed many Dardic features that are found in present-day Kashmiri. Thus, the archaic form of old Konkani is referred to as Paishachi by some linguists. This progenitor of Konkani (or Paishachi Apabhramsha) has preserved an older form of phonetic and grammatic development, showing a great variety of verbal forms found in Sanskrit and a large number of grammatical forms that are not found in Marathi. (Examples of this are found in many works like Dnyaneshwari, and Leela Charitra.) Konkani thus developed with overall Sanskrit complexity and grammatical structure, which eventually developed into a lexical fund of its own. The second wave of Indo-Aryans is believed to have been accompanied by Dravidians from the Deccan plateau. Paishachi is also considered to be an Aryan language spoken by Dravidians.

Goa and Konkan were ruled by the Konkan Mauryas and the Bhojas; as a result, numerous migrations occurred from north, east and western India. Immigrants spoke various vernacular languages, which led to a mixture of features of Eastern and Western Prakrit. It was later substantially influenced by Magadhi Prakrit. The overtones of Pali (the liturgical language of the Buddhists) also played a very important role in the development of Konkani Apabhramsha grammar and vocabulary. A major number of linguistic innovations in Konkani are shared with Eastern Indo-Aryan languages like Bengali and Oriya, which have their roots in Magadhi.

Maharashtri Prakrit is the ancestor of Marathi and Konkani, it was the official language of the Satavahana Empire that ruled Goa and Konkan in the early centuries of the Common Era. Under the patronage of the Satavahana Empire, Maharashtri became the most widespread Prakrit of its time. Studying early Maharashtri compilations, many linguists have called Konkani "the first-born daughter of Maharashtri". This old language that was prevalent contemporary to old Marathi is found to be distinct from its counterpart.

The Sauraseni influence on Konkani is not as prominent as that of Maharashtri. Very few Konkani words are found to follow the Sauraseni pattern. Konkani forms are rather more akin to Pali than the corresponding Sauraseni forms. The major Sauraseni influence on Konkani is the ao sound found at the end of many nouns in Sauraseni, which becomes o or u in Konkani. Examples include: dando, suno, raakhano, dukh, rukhu, manisu (from Prakrit), dandao, sunnao, rakkhakao, dukkhao, vukkhao, vrukkhao, and mannisso. Another example could be the sound of ण at the beginning of words; it is still retained in many Konkani words of archaic Shauraseni origin, such as णव (nine). Archaic Konkani born out of Shauraseni vernacular Prakrit at the earlier stage of the evolution (and later Maharashtri Prakrit), was commonly spoken until 875 AD, and at its later phase ultimately developed into Apabhramsha, which could be called a predecessor of old Konkani.

Although most of the stone inscriptions and copper plates found in Goa (and other parts of Konkan) from the 2nd century BC to the 10th century AD are in Prakrit-influenced Sanskrit (mostly written in early Brahmi and archaic Dravidian Brahmi), most of the places, grants, agricultural-related terms, and names of some people are in Konkani. This suggests that Konkani was spoken in Goa and Konkan.

Though it belongs to the Indo-Aryan group, Konkani was influenced by a language of the Dravidian family. A branch of the Kadambas, who ruled Goa for a long period, had their roots in Karnataka. Konkani was never used for official purposes. Another reason Kannada influenced Konkani was the proximity of original Konkani-speaking territories to Karnataka. Old Konkani documents show considerable Kannada influence on grammar as well as vocabulary. Like southern Dravidian languages, Konkani has prothetic glides y- and w-. The Kannada influence is more evident in Konkani syntax. The question markers in yes/no questions and the negative marker are sentence final. Copula deletion in Konkani is remarkably similar to Kannada. Phrasal verbs are not so commonly used in Indo-Aryan languages; however, Konkani spoken in Dravidian regions has borrowed numerous phrasal verb patterns.

The Kols, Kharwas, Yadavas, and Lothal migrants all settled in Goa during the pre-historic period and later. Chavada, a tribe of warriors (also now known as Chaddi or Chaddo), migrated to Goa from Saurashtra, during the 7th and 8th century AD, after their kingdom was destroyed by the Arabs in 740. Royal matrimonial relationships between the two states, as well as trade relationships, had a major influence on Goan society. Many of these groups spoke different Nagar Apabhramsha dialects, which could be seen as precursors of modern Gujarati.

- Konkani and Gujarati have many words in common, not found in Marathi.
- The Konkani O (as opposed to the Marathi A, which is of different Prakrit origin), is similar to that in Gujarati.
- The case terminations in Konkani, lo, li, and le, and the Gujarati no, ni, and ne have the same Prakrit roots.
- In both languages the present indicatives have no gender, unlike Marathi.

=== Early ===
An inscription at the foot of the colossal Jain monolith Bahubali (The word gomateshvara apparently comes from Konkani gomaṭo which means "beautiful" or "handsome" and īśvara "lord".) at Shravanabelagola of 981 CE reads, in a variant of Nāgarī:

"śrīcāvuṇḍarājē̃ kara viyālē̃, śrīgaṅgārājē̃ suttālē̃ kara viyālē̃" (Chavundaraya got it done, Gangaraya got the surroundings done). (Note: Chavundaraya was the military chief of the Ganga dynasty-era King Gangaraya. This inscription on the Bahubali statue draws attention to a Basadi (Jain Temple) initially built by him and then modified by Gangaraya in the 12th century AD. Ref: S. Settar in Adiga (2006), p256) (Note: The above inscription has been quite controversial, and is touted as old-Marathi. But the distinctive instrumental viyalem ending of the verb is the hallmark of the Konkani language, and the verb sutatale or sutatalap is not prevalent in Marathi. So linguists and historians such as S.B. Kulkarni of Nagpur University, V.P. Chavan (former vice-president of the Anthropological Society of Mumbai), and others have thus concluded that it is Konkani.)

The language of these lines is Konkani according to S.B. Kulkarni (former head of Department of Marathi, Nagpur University) and Jose Pereira (former professor, Fordham University, USA).

Another inscription in Nāgarī, of Shilahara King Aparaditya II of the year 1187 AD in Parel reportedly contains Marathi according to former claims. A recent 2024 study has found that the last two lines of the Parel inscription (also called "the Mahavali inscription", because it was discovered at Mahavali in Kurla, Bombay (Mumbai)) is in the Konkani language.

Many stone and copper-plate inscriptions found in Goa and Konkan are written in Konkani. The grammar and the base of such texts is in Konkani, whereas very few verbs are in Marathi. Copper plates found in Ponda dating back to the early 13th century, and from Quepem in the early 14th century, have been written in Goykanadi. One such stone inscription or shilalekh (written Nāgarī) is found at the Nageshi temple in Goa (dating back to the year 1463 AD). It mentions that the (then) ruler of Goa, Devaraja Gominam, had gifted land to the Nagueshi Maharudra temple when Nanjanna Gosavi was the religious head or Pratihasta of the state. It mentions words like, kullgga, kulaagra, naralel, tambavem, and tilel.

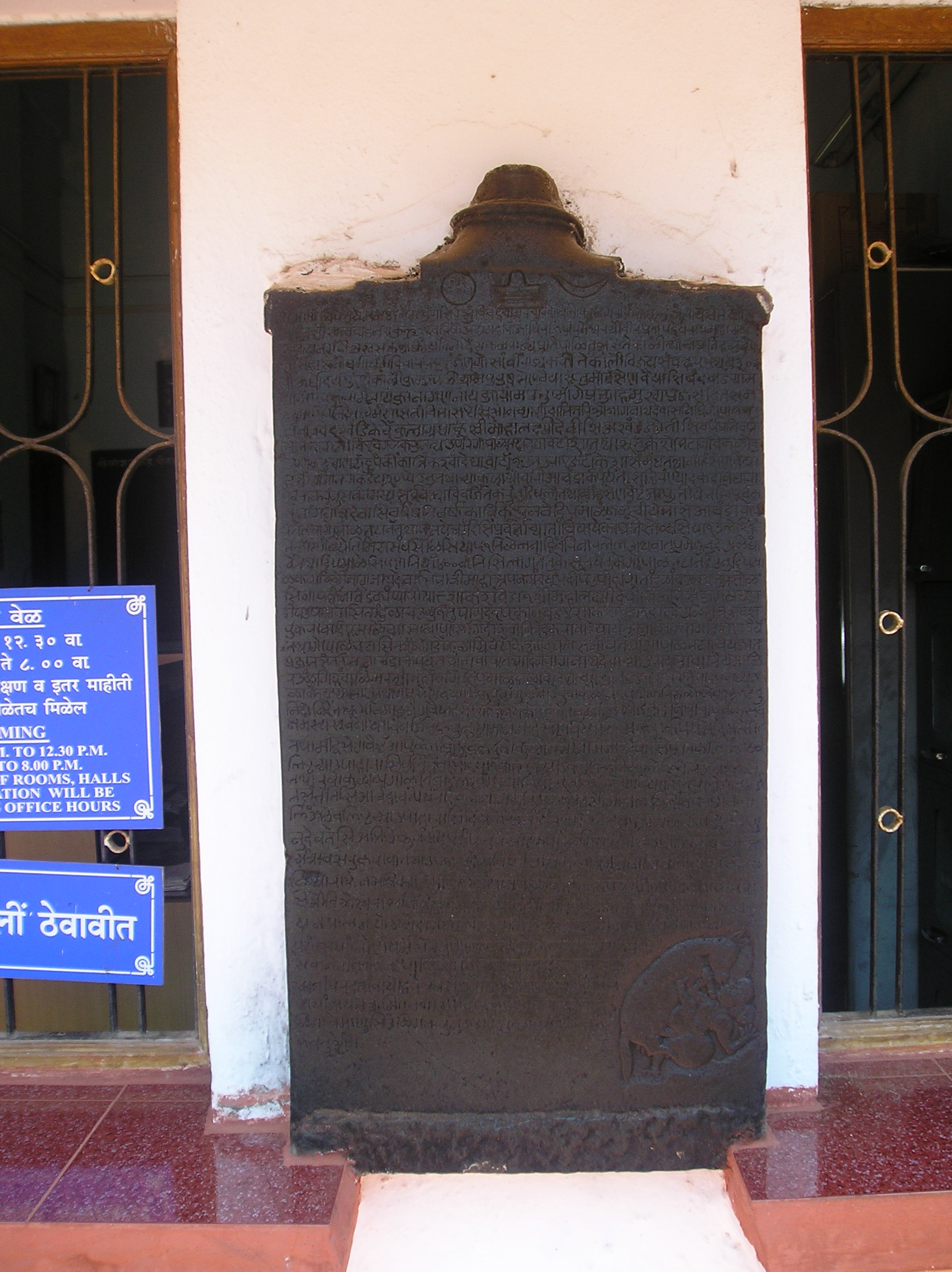
Konkani Inscription with 'Maee Shenvi' of 1413 AD, Nagueshi, Goa.

A piece of hymn dedicated to Lord Narayana attributed to the 12th century AD says:

"jaṇẽ rasataḷavāntũ matsyarūpē̃ vēda āṇiyēlē̃. manuśivāka vāṇiyēlē̃. to saṁsārasāgara tāraṇu. mōhō to rākho nārāyāṇu". (The one who brought the Vedas up from the ocean in the form of a fish, from the bottoms of the water and offered it to Manu, he is the one Saviour of the world, that is Narayana my God.).

A hymn from the later 16th century goes

vaikuṇṭhācē̃ jhāḍa tu gē phaḷa amṛtācē̃, jīvita rākhilē̃ tuvē̃ manasakuḷācē̃.

Early Konkani was marked by the use of pronouns like dzo, jī, and jẽ. These are replaced in contemporary Konkani by koṇa. The conjunctions yedō and tedō ("when" and "then") which were used in early Konkani are no longer in use. The use of -viyalẽ has been replaced by -aylẽ. The pronoun moho, which is similar to the Brajbhasha word mōhē has been replaced by mākā.

=== Medieval ===
This era was marked by several invasions of Goa and subsequent exodus of some Konkani families to Canara (today's coastal Karnataka), and Cochin.

- Exodus (between 1312 and 1327) when General Malik Kafur of the Delhi Sultans, Alauddin Khalji, and Muhammed bin Tughlaq destroyed Govepuri and the Kadambas
- Exodus subsequent to 1470 when the Bahmani kingdom captured Goa, and subsequent capture in 1492 by Sultan Yusuf Adil Shah of Bijapur
- Exodus of converted Muslims to Bijapur-held territory due to the Portuguese conquest of Goa in 1510
- Migration of Hindu converts to Canara in South India after the Christianisation of Goa, the subsequent Goa Inquisition, and the Sackings of Goa and Bombay-Bassein.

These events caused the Konkani language to develop into multiple dialects with multiple scripts. The exodus to coastal Karnataka and Kerala required Konkani speakers in these regions to learn the local languages. This caused penetration of local words into the dialects of Konkani spoken by these speakers. Examples include dār (door) giving way to the word bāgil. Also, the phoneme "a" in the Salcette dialect was replaced by the phoneme "o".

Other Konkani communities came into being with their own dialects of Konkani. The Konkani Muslim communities of Ratnagiri and Coastal Karnataka came about due to a mixture of intermarriages of Arab seafarers, Middle East businessman, Britishes and locals as well as conversions of Hindus to Islam. Another migrant community that picked up Konkani are the Siddis, who are descended from Bantu peoples from South East Africa that were brought to the Indian subcontinent as slaves.

=== Contemporary ===
Contemporary Konkani is written in Devanagari, Kannada, Malayalam, Persian, and Roman scripts. It is written by speakers in their native dialects. The Goan Antruz dialect in the Devanagari script has been promulgated as Standard Konkani.

== Revitalisation ==
Konkani language was in decline, due to the use of Portuguese as the official and social language among the Christians, the predominance of Marathi over Konkani among Hindus, and the Konkani Christian-Hindu divide. Seeing this, Vaman Raghunath Varde Valaulikar set about on a mission to unite all Konkanis, Hindus as well as Christians, regardless of caste or religion. He saw this movement not just as a nationalistic movement against Portuguese rule, but also against the pre-eminence of Marathi over Konkani. Almost single-handedly he crusaded, writing a number of works in Konkani. He is regarded as the pioneer of modern Konkani literature and affectionately remembered as Shenoi Goembab. His death anniversary, 9 April, is celebrated as World Konkani Day (Vishwa Konkani Dis).

Madhav Manjunath Shanbhag, an advocate by profession from Karwar, who with a few like-minded companions travelled throughout all the Konkani speaking areas, sought to unite the fragmented Konkani community under the banner of "one language, one script, one literature". He succeeded in organising the first All India Konkani Parishad in Karwar in 1939. Successive adhiveshans of All India Konkani Parishad were held at various places in subsequent years. At least 29 adhiveshans of All India Konkani Parishad have been held since.

=== Post-independence period ===
Following India's independence and its subsequent annexation of Goa in 1961, Goa was absorbed into the Indian Union as a Union Territory, directly under central administration.

However, with the reorganisation of states along linguistic lines, and growing calls from Maharashtra, as well as Marathis in Goa for the merger of Goa into Maharashtra, an intense debate was started in Goa. The main issues discussed were the status of Konkani as an independent language and Goa's future as a part of Maharashtra or as an independent state. The Goa Opinion Poll, a plebiscite, retained Goa as an independent state in 1967. However, English, Hindi, and Marathi continued to be the preferred languages for official communication, while Konkani was sidelined.

=== Recognition as an independent language ===
With the continued insistence of some Marathis that Konkani was a dialect of Marathi and not an independent language, the matter was finally placed before the Sahitya Akademi. Suniti Kumar Chatterji, the president of the Akademi appointed a committee of linguistic experts to settle the dispute. On 26 February 1975, the committee came to the conclusion that Konkani was indeed an independent and literary language, classified as an Indo-European language, which in its present state was heavily influenced by the Portuguese language.

=== Official language status ===
All this did not change anything in Goa. Finally, fed up with the delay, Konkani activists launched an agitation in 1986, demanding official status for Konkani. The agitation turned violent in various places, resulting in the death of six agitators from the Catholic community: Floriano Vaz from Gogol Margao, Aldrin Fernandes, Mathew Faria, C. J. Dias, John Fernandes, and Joaquim Pereira, all from Agaçaim. Finally, on 4 February 1987, the Goa Legislative Assembly passed the Official Language Bill, making Konkani the official language of Goa.

Konkani was included in the Eighth Schedule to the Constitution of India as per the Seventy-First Amendment on 20 August 1992, adding it to the list of official languages.

== Geographical distribution ==
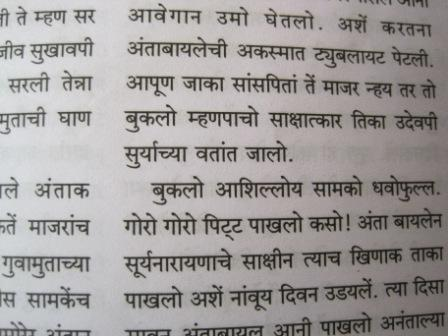
Modern day Goan Konkani in Devanagari

The Konkani language originated and is spoken widely in the western coastal region of India known as Konkan. The native lands historically inhabited by Konkani people include the Konkan division of Maharashtra, the state of Goa and the territory of Daman, the Uttara Kannada, Udupi & Dakshina Kannada districts of Karnataka, belagavi, Mysore, and Bengaluru along with many districts in Kerala such as Kasaragod, Kochi, Alappuzha, Thiruvananthapuram and Kottayam. All of the regions and areas have developed distinct dialects, pronunciation and prose styles, vocabulary, tone, and sometimes, significant differences in grammar.

According to the 2001 estimates of the Census Department of India, there were 2,489,016 Konkani speakers in India. The Census Department of India, 2011 figures put the number of Konkani speakers in India as 2,256,502 making up 0.19% of India's population. Out of these, 788,294 were in Karnataka, 964,305 in Goa, 399,255 in Maharashtra, and 69,449 in Kerala. It ranks 19th on the List of Scheduled Languages by strength. The number of Konkani speakers in India fell by 9.34% in the decade 2001–2011. It is the only scheduled language apart from Urdu to have a negative growth rate in the decade. A very large number of Konkanis live outside India, either as expatriates (NRIs) with work visas or as naturalised citizens and permanent residents of other host countries (immigrants). Determining their numbers is difficult since Konkani is a minority language that is very often not recognised by censuses and surveys of various government agencies and NGOs catering to Indians abroad.

During the days of Portuguese Goa and British rule in Pre-Partition India many Goans and non-Goan Konkani people went to foreign countries as economic migrants to the colonies of Portuguese and British Empire respectively, and also to the Pakistan of Pre-Partition India. The migratory trend has continued well into the post-colonial era and a significant number of Konkani people are found in Kenya, Uganda, Pakistan, the Persian Gulf countries, Portugal and the European Union, and the British Isles and the rest of the Anglosphere. Many families still continue to speak different Konkani dialects that their ancestors spoke, which are now highly influenced by the languages of the dominant majority.

== Status and issues ==
The Konkani language has been in danger of dying out over the years for many of the following reasons:

1. The fragmentation of Konkani into various, sometimes mutually unintelligible, dialects.
2. The dominance of Marathi and the large degree of bilingualism of Konkani Hindus in Goa state, the union territory of Damaon and the Konkan division of Maharashtra.
3. Progressive inroads made by Urdu into the Konkani Muslim community.
4. Mutual animosity among various religious sects and caste groups; including a secondary status of Konkani culture to religion.
5. The migration of Konkanis to various parts of India and around the world.
6. The lack of opportunities to study Konkani in schools and colleges. Even until recently there were few Konkani schools in Goa. Populations outside the native Konkani areas have absolutely no access to Konkani language studies, literature and media.
7. The preference among Konkani parents to speak to their children in potaachi bhaas (language of the stomach) over maai bhaas (mother tongue). They sometimes speak primarily in English to help their children gain a grip on English in schools.

As such, Konkani has been classified in the "Unsafe" Category of the UNESCO Atlas of the World's Languages in Danger since 2009.

Efforts have been made to stop this downward trend of usage of Konkani, starting with Shenoi Goembab's efforts to revive Konkani. The recognition granted by Sahitya Akademi to Konkani and the institution of an annual award for Konkani literature has helped to a certain extent.

Some organisations, such as the Konkan Daiz Yatra organised by Konkani Bhasha Mandal, World Konkani Centre and the newer Vishwa Konkani Parishad have laid great stress on uniting all factions of Konkanis.

=== Opposition ===
==== Marathi dispute ====
José Pereira, in his 1971 work Konkani – A Language: A History of the Konkani Marathi Controversy, pointed to an essay on Indian languages written by John Leyden in 1807, wherein Konkani is called a "dialect of Maharashtra" as an origin of the language controversy.

Another linguist to whom this theory is attributed is Grierson. Grierson's work on the languages of India, the Linguistic Survey of India, was regarded as an important reference by other linguists. In his book, Grierson had distinguished between the Konkani spoken in coastal Maharashtra (then, part of Bombay) and the Konkani spoken in Goa as two different languages. He regarded the Konkani spoken in coastal Maharashtra as a dialect of Marathi and not as a dialect of Goan Konkani itself. In his opinion, Goan Konkani was also considered a dialect of Marathi because the religious literature used by the Hindus in Goa was not in Konkani itself, but in Marathi.

S. M. Katre's 1966 work, The Formation of Konkani, which utilised the instruments of modern historical and comparative linguistics across six typical Konkani dialects, showed the formation of Konkani to be distinct from that of Marathi. Shenoi Goembab, who played a pivotal role in the Konkani revival movement, rallied against the pre-eminence of Marathi over Konkani amongst Hindus and Portuguese amongst Christians.

Goa's accession to India in 1961 came at a time when Indian states were being reorganised along linguistic lines. There were demands to merge Goa with Maharashtra. This was because Goa had a sizeable population of Marathi speakers and Konkani was also considered to be a dialect of Marathi by many. Konkani Goans were opposed to the move. The status of Konkani as an independent language or as a dialect of Marathi had a great political bearing on Goa's merger, which was settled by a plebiscite in 1967 (the Goa Opinion Poll).

The Sahitya Akademi (a prominent literary organisation in India) recognised it as an independent language in 1975, and subsequently Konkani (in Devanagari script) was made the official language of Goa in 1987.

=== Karnataka ===
MLC Ivan D'Souza attempted to speak in Konkani at the Karnataka state's Legislative Council, but was urged not to by the Chairman D H Shankaramurthy as most of the audience did not know Konkani. Even though Mr D'Souza pleaded that Konkani was amongst the 22 official languages recognised by the Indian Constitution, he was not given permission to continue in Konkani.

Even though there are substantial Konkani Catholics in Bengaluru, efforts to celebrate Holy Mass in Konkani have met with opposition by Kannada "activists". Konkani Holy Masses has been held in the Sabbhavana and Saccidananda chapels of the Carmelite and Capuchin Fathers respectively, in Yeswanthpur and Rajajinagar, Bangalore. These services are under threat from Kannada groups who do not want church services to be held in any language other than Kannada, even though Kannada Catholics constitute only 30% of the Catholic population in the Archdiocese.. Konkani activists and associations have been demanding Konkani language mass and services for a long time. It is still the official language of the Mangalore Diocese.

=== Multilingualism ===
According to the Census Department of India, Konkani speakers show a very high degree of multilingualism. In the 1991 census, as compared to the national average of 19.44% for bilingualism and 7.26% for trilingualism, Konkani speakers scored 74.20% and 44.68% respectively. This makes the Konkans the most multilingual community of India.

This has been due to the fact that in most areas where Konkans have settled, they seldom form a majority of the population and have to interact with others in the local tongue. Another reason for bilingualism has been the lack of schools teaching Konkani as a primary or secondary language.

The bilingualism of Konkanis with Marathi in Daman Goa and Maharashtra has been a source of great discontent because it has led to the belief that Konkani is a dialect of Marathi and hence has no bearing on the future of Goa.

=== Scripts and dialects ===
The problems posed by multiple scripts and varying dialects have come as an impediment in the efforts to unite Konkani people. The Goa state's decision to use Devanagari as the official script and the Antruz dialect has been met with opposition both within Goa and outside it. Critics contend that the Antruz dialect is unintelligible to most Goans, let alone other Konkani people outside Goa, and that Devanagari is used very little as compared to Romi Konkani in Goa or Konkani in the Kannada script. Prominent among the critics are Konkani Christians in Goa, who were at the forefront of the Konkani agitation in 1986–87 and have for a long time used the Roman script, including producing literature in Roman script. They demanded Roman script be given equal status to Devanagari.

In Karnataka, which has the largest number of Konkani speakers after Goa, leading organisations and activists have similarly demanded that Kannada script be made the medium of instruction for Konkani in local schools instead of Devanagari. The government of Karnataka has given its approval for teaching of Konkani as an optional third language from 6th to 10th standard students either in Kannada or Devanagari scripts.

=== Outside India ===
Emigration has also brought the Konkani language to foreign countries, such as the United States, Canada, the United Arab Emirates and Kenya.

== Phonology ==
The Konkani language has 9 vowels (each with a nasal counterpart), 36 consonants, 5 semi-vowels, 3 sibilants, 1 aspirate, and many diphthongs. Different types of nasal vowels are a special feature of the Konkani language.

=== Vowels ===
Vowels of Konkani
	Front	Central	Back
Close	i ĩ		u ũ
Close-mid	e ẽ	ɵ ɵ̃	o õ
Open-mid	ɛ ɛ̃	ʌ ʌ̃	ɔ ɔ̃
Open	(æ)	a ã	

One of the most distinguishing features of Konkani phonology is the use of /ɵ/, the close-mid central vowel, instead of the schwa found in Hindustani and Marathi. Whereas many Indian languages use only one of the three front vowels, represented by the Devanagari grapheme ए, Konkani uses two: /e/ and /ɛ/.

Vowel length is not phonemic in Konkani, with vowels in monosyllables being long and other vowels being short. Konkani has predictable, non-phonemic stress, and lacks phonemic tone.

=== Consonants ===
Consonants of Konkani
		Labial	Dental	Alveolar	Retroflex	(Alveolo-) palatal	Velar	Glottal
Nasal	plain	m		n	ɳ	ɲ	ŋ	
Nasal	murmured	mʱ		nʱ	ɳʱ			
Stop/ Affricate	voiceless	p	t	t͡s	ʈ	t͡ɕ	k	
Stop/ Affricate	aspirated	pʰ	tʰ	t͡sʰ	ʈʰ	t͡ɕʰ	kʰ	
Stop/ Affricate	voiced	b	d	d͡z	ɖ	d͡ʑ	ɡ	
Stop/ Affricate	murmured	bʱ	dʱ	d͡zʱ	ɖʱ	d͡ʑʱ	ɡʱ	
Fricative		(f) (Note: /f/ was introduced into Konkani phonology via. Portuguese and largely replaces /pʰ/ in Goan and Mangalorean Christian dialects, however /pʰ/ is still retained in formal speech.)		s		ɕ		h
Approximant	plain	ʋ		l		j		
Approximant	murmured	ʋʱ		lʱ				
Flap/Trill	plain			ɾ	(ɽ)			
Flap/Trill	lateral				𝼈			
Flap/Trill	murmured			ɾʱ				

- The palatal and alveolar stops are affricates. The palatal glides are truly palatal but otherwise the consonants in the palatal column are alveopalatal.
- Phonemic palatalisation is found in all obstruents, except for palatal and alveolars. Where a palatalised alveolar is expected, a palatal is found instead. In the case of glides, only labial glides /ʋ/ and /ʋʱ/ show this contrast, and among the other sonorants, only unaspirated consonants exhibit this.
- In initial position, many speakers substitute unaspirated consonants for aspirates. However, the vowel is shortened after phonemic aspirates and fricatives, preserving the contrast. Aspirates in a non-initial position are rare and only occur in careful speech.
- /ɖ/ pronounced [ɽ] except initially or after a consonant.

The consonants in Konkani are similar to those in Marathi.

=== Developments from Sanskrit ===
- Metathesis is a characteristic of all the middle and modern Indo-Aryan languages including Konkani. Consider the Sanskrit word स्नुषा (snuṣā "daughter-in law"). Here, the ष ṣ is dropped, and स्नु snu alone is utilised. स्नु-->स/नु, resulting in the Konkani word सुन sun after metathesis of u.
- Unlike Sanskrit, anusvara has great importance in Konkani. A characteristic of Middle Indo-Aryan languages, Konkani still retains the anusvara on the initial or final syllable.However, visarga ḥ is totally lost and becomes उ and/or ओ. For example, in Sanskrit दीपः dīpaḥ becomes दिवो divo and दुःख duḥkha becomes दुख dukh.
- Konkani does not have ऋ ṛ, ॠ ṝ, ऌ ḷ, ॡ ḹ, and ष ṣ.
- Sanskrit compound letters are avoided in Konkani. For example, in Sanskrit द्वे, प्राय, गृहस्थ, उद्योत become बे, पिराय, गिरेस्त, and उज्जो respectively in Konkani.

=== Alternations ===
- Open-mid vowels alternate with close-mid vowels, particularly when the next syllable contains a close or close-mid vowel. This was once more consistent, but has become opaque due to vowel deletion.
- Vowels are deleted in medial syllables between consonants that are not in clusters.
- In suffixes with /j/, the /j/ becomes /ij/ when added to a monosyllable, and becomes palatalization of the last consonant when added after a consonant cluster. Alveolar sibilants become palatal before front vowels or palatal consonants.

== Grammar ==
Konkani grammar is similar to other Indo-Aryan languages. Notably, Konkani grammar is also influenced by Dravidian languages.

Speech can be classified into any of the following parts:

1. naam (noun)
2. sarvanaam (pronoun)
3. visheshan (adjective)
4. kriyapad (verb)
5. kriyavisheshana (adverb)
6. ubhayanvayi avyaya
7. shabdayogi avyaya
8. kevalaprayogi avyaya (interjection)

Like most of the Indo-Aryan languages, Konkani is an SOV language, meaning among other things that not only is the verb found at the end of the clause but also modifiers and complements tend to precede the head and postpositions are far more common than prepositions. In terms of syntax, Konkani is a head-last language, unlike English, which is an SVO language.

- Almost all the verbs, adverbs, adjectives, and the avyayas are either tatsama or tadbhava.

=== Nouns ===
Like Marathi and Gujarati, the Konkani language has three genders. During the Middle Ages, most of the Indo-Aryan languages lost their neuter gender, except Maharashtri, in which it is retained much more in Marathi than Konkani. Gender in Konkani is purely grammatical and unconnected to gender.

Konkani nouns have four stems, which can be direct or oblique, as well as singular or plural. The direct stems are identical to the nominative case, while the oblique stems form other cases. The four stems are related through a number of declensions, as shown with examples in the table below.

Noun declensions
Gender	Direct singular	Direct plural	Oblique singular	Oblique plural	Gloss	Notes
Masculine	gʱɔɖɔ	gʱɔɖɛ	gʱɔɖja	gʱɔɖjã	'(male) horse'	
Feminine	gʱoɖi	gʱoɖjo	gʱoɖje	gʱoɖjã	'(female) horse'	
Neuter	gʱɔɖɛ̃	gʱoɖĩ	gʱɔɖja	gʱoɖjã	'foal'	
Masculine	deʋ	dɛʋ	dɛʋa	dɛʋã	'god'	
Masculine	reɖiyo	reɖiyo	reɖiyo	reɖiyõ	'radio'	Common in loanwords
Neuter	ɡʱɵr	ɡʱɵrã	ɡʱɵra	ɡʱɵrã	'house'	
Feminine	vaʈ	vaʈo	vaʈe	vaʈõ	'path'	
Feminine	kat	kati	kati	katĩ	'skin'	
Feminine	ʃa𝼈a	ʃa𝼈a	ʃa𝼈e	ʃa𝼈ã	'school'	

The number of cases in Konkani is disputed. The table below shows the analysis by Peterson and Mopkar (2024) (excluding the nominative, which is identical to the direct stem, and the genitive cases, shown further below). Each of these case is formed by attaching a clitic to the end of the oblique form depending on number.

Noun Cases
Case	Singular	Plural	Notes
Objective	-k		
Ergative/Instrumental	-n	-ni	
Ablative/Instrumental	-t͡ɕan		
Inessive	-nt	-ni	
Superessive	-r/-t͡ser		Only /-t͡ser/ is allowed after pronouns. Otherwise, the forms are interchangeable
Kinship essive	-ger		
Ablative	-san		Has a number of dialectal forms
Elative	-ntlʲan		
Vocative	-∅	-no	The vocative singular is identical to the oblique singular stem.

Each genitive clitics takes a suffix depending on the gender, number, and direct/oblique status of the following head noun in an identical manner to adjectives (as such, only the beginning of the clitic is shown). The human genitive is only used in formal contexts when the possessor is human, and is interchangeable with the genitive in these contexts.

Genitive clitics
Case	Beginning	Notes
Genitive	-t͡s-	
Human Genitive	-l-	
Kinship Genitive	-gɛl-	
Selective	-ntl-	

Several of these cases were diachronically derived from stacking cases. For example, the selective case comes from the inessive followed by the human genitive.

=== Adjectives ===
Many adjectives take suffixes agree with the gender, number, and direct/oblique status of the following head noun, as shown below.

Adjective declension
	Masculine	Feminine	Neuter
Direct singular	-ɔ	-i	-ɛ̃
Direct plural	-ɛ	-jo	ĩ
Oblique singular	-ja	-e	-ja
Oblique plural	-ja		

Apart from these, all other adjectives are indeclinable and take the same form regardless of their head.

=== Verbs ===
Verbs are either tatsama or tadbhava:

Verbs and their roots:
Konkani verbs	Sanskrit/Prakrit Root	Translation
वाच vaach (tatsama)	वच् vach	read
आफय, आपय aaphay, aapay (tatsama)	आव्हय् aavhay	call, summon
रांध raandh (tatsama)	रांध् raandh	cook
बरय baray (tadbhav)	वर्णय् varnay	write
व्हर vhar (tadbhav)	हर har	take away
भक bhak (tadbhav)	भक्ष् bhaksh	eat
हेड hedd (tadbhav)	अट् att	roam
ल्हेव lhev (tadbhav)	लेह् leh	lick
शीन sheen (tadbhav)	छिन्न chinna	cut
Source: Koṅkaṇî Dhatukosh

- Present indefinite of the auxiliary is fused with present participle of the primary verb, and the auxiliary is partially dropped. When the southern dialects came in contact with Dravidian languages this difference became more prominent in Karnataka and Kerala whereas Goan Konkani still retains the original form.
- For example, "I eat" and "I am eating" sound similar in Goan Konkani, due to loss of auxiliary in colloquial speech. "Hāv khātā" corresponds to "I am eating". On the other hand, in Karnataka Konkani "hāv khātā" corresponds to "I eat", and "hāv khātoāsā" or "hāv khāter āsā" means "I am eating". However the word "jito" (living) is universal, "to jitoāsā" (he is living).
- Konkani has lost its passive voice, and now the transitive verbs in their perfects are equivalent to passives.

==== Verb conjugation ====
Verb stems in Konkani are formed from a verb root with a suffix denoting valency, generally one of -ʌ, -ɛ (intransitive), -i (transitive), -ɵj, or -aj (causative). An aspect marker is added on to the stem, either -t (imperfect) or -l (perfect). From there, for tenses other than the present, a base is formed by adding a tense and aspect marker: -(a)l (non-past), -l (past perfect), or -al (past imperfect). Personal endings are then added onto this base. In the present, different personal endings are added directly after the aspect marker.

Non-present personal endings
	Masculine	Feminine	Neuter
1st person singular	-ɔ̃	-ĩ	-ɛ̃
2nd/3rd person singular	-ɔ	-ĩ	-ɛ̃
1st person plural	-ɛ	-ĩ	-jo
2nd/3rd person plural	-ɛ	-ĩ	

Present personal endings
	Ending
1st person singular	-ã
2nd/3rd person singular	-a
1st person plural	-at
2nd/3rd person plural	-at

Verbs also have an oblique base, with the suffix -ũ added to the stem, which is used to form participles, as well as the optative mood.

== Vocabulary ==
The vocabulary from Konkani comes from a number of sources. The main source is Prakrits. So Sanskrit as a whole has played a very important part in Konkani vocabulary. Konkani vocabulary is made of tatsama (Sanskrit loanwords without change), tadhbhava (evolved Sanskrit words), deshya (indigenous words) and antardeshya (foreign words). Other sources of vocabulary are Arabic, Persian, and Turkish. Finally, Kannada, Marathi, and Portuguese have enriched its lexical content.

=== Loanwords ===
Since Goa was a major trade centre for visiting Arabs and Turks, many Arabic and Persian words infiltrated the Konkani language. A large number of Arabic and Persian words now form an integral part of Konkani vocabulary and are commonly used in day-to-day life; examples are karz (debt), fakt (only), dusman (enemy), and barik (thin). Single and compound words are found wherein the original meaning has been changed or distorted. Examples include mustaiki (from Arabic mustaid, meaning "ready"), and kapan khairo ("eater of one's own shroud", meaning "a miser").

Most of the old Konkani Hindu literature does not show any influence from Portuguese. Even the dialects spoken by the majority of Goan Hindus have a very limited Portuguese influence. On the other hand, dialects spoken by the Catholics from Goa (as well as the Canara to some extent) and their religious literature show a strong Portuguese influence. They contain a number of Portuguese lexical items, but these are almost all religious terms. Even in the context of religious terminology, the missionaries adapted native terms associated with Hindu religious concepts. (For example, krupa for grace, Yamakunda for hell, Vaikuntha for paradise and so on). The syntax used by Goan Catholics in their literature shows a prominent Portuguese influence. As a result, many Portuguese loanwords are now commonly found in common Konkani speech. The Portuguese influence is also evident in the Marathi–Konkani spoken in the former Northern Konkan district, Thane a variant of Konkani used by Bombay East Indians Catholic community.

=== Sanskritisation ===
Konkani is not highly Sanskritised like Marathi, but still retains Prakrit and apabhramsa structures, verbal forms, and vocabulary. Though the Goan Hindu dialect is highly Prakritised, numerous Sanskrit loanwords are found, while the Catholic dialect has historically drawn many terms from Portuguese. The Catholic literary dialect has now adopted Sanskritic vocabulary itself, and the Catholic Church has also adopted a Sanskritisation policy. Despite the relative unfamiliarity of the recently introduced Sanskritic vocabulary to the new Catholic generations, there has not been wide resistance to the change. On the other hand, southern Konkani dialects, having been influenced by Kannada − one of the languages of Dravidian origin − have undergone re-Sanskritisation over time.

== Writing systems ==
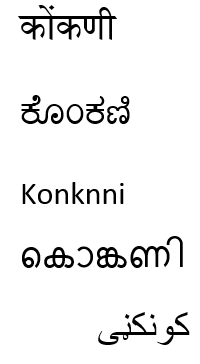
The name Konkani in the five scripts it is written in: Devanagari, Kannada, Latin, Malayalam, Arabic. Another popular script it is written in, is termed as Romi Konkani. In this script the Latin script is used to write in Konkani. This script is popularly used by The Goan Catholic community either in churches or in Catholic books such as prayer books or the Bible.

Konkani has been compelled to become a language using a multiplicity of scripts, and not just one single script used everywhere. This has led to an outward splitting up of the same language, which is spoken and understood by all, despite some inevitable dialectal convergences.

=== Past ===
The Brahmi script for Konkani fell into disuse. Later, some inscriptions were written in old Nagari. However, owing to the Portuguese conquest in 1510 and the subsequent various restrictions imposed by the Inquisition, some early forms of Devanagari fell out of use in Goa. The Portuguese promulgated a law banning the use of non-Roman scripts for Konkani in Goa.

Another script, called Kandevi or Goykandi, was used for Konkani since the times of the Kadambas, although it lost its popularity after the 17th century. Kandevi/Goykandi is very different from the Halegannada script, with strikingly similar features. Unlike Halegannada, Kandevi/Goykandi letters were usually written with a distinctive horizontal bar, like the Nagari scripts. This script may have been evolved out of the Kadamba script, which was extensively used in Goa and Konkan. The earliest known inscription in Devanagari dates to 1187 AD. The Roman script has the oldest preserved and protected literary tradition, beginning from the 16th century.

=== Present ===
Konkani is written in five scripts: Devanagari, Roman, Kannada, Malayalam, and Perso-Arabic. Because Devanagari is the official script used to write Konkani in Goa and Maharashtra, most Konkanis (especially Hindus) in those two states write the language in Devanagari. However, Konkani is widely written in the Roman script (called Romi Konkani) by many Konkanis, (especially Catholics). This is because for many years, all Konkani literature was in the Latin script, and Catholic liturgy and other religious literature has always been in the Roman script. Most people of Karnataka use the Kannada script; however, the Saraswats of Karnataka use the Devanagari script in the uttara Kannada district. Malayalam script was used by the Konkani community in Kerala, but there has been a move towards the usage of the Devanagari script in recent years. Konkani Muslims use Arabic script to write Konkani. There has been to trend towards the usage of the Arabic script among Muslim communities; this coincides with them mixing more Urdu and Arabic words into their Konkani dialects. When the Sahitya Akademi recognised Konkani in 1975 as an independent and literary language, one of the important factors was the literary heritage of Romi Konkani since the year 1556. However, after Konkani in the Devanagari script was made the official language of Goa in 1987, the Sahitya Akademi has supported only writers in the Devanagari script. For a very long time there has been a rising demand for official recognition of Romi Konkani by Catholics in Goa because a sizeable population of the people in Goa use the Roman script. Also a lot of the content on the Internet and the staging of the famed Tiatr is written in Romi Konkani. In January 2013, the Goa Bench of the Bombay High Court issued a notice to the state government on a Public Interest Litigation filed by the Romi Lipi Action Front seeking to amend the Official Language Act to grant official language status to Romi Konkani but has not yet been granted.

==== Alphabet/vaṇamāḷha ====
The vowels, consonants, and their arrangement are as follows:

अ	a /ɐ/	आ	ā /ɑː/	इ	i /i/	ई	ī /iː/	उ	u /u/	ऊ	ū /uː/	ए	e /eː/	ऐ	ai /aːi/	ओ	o /oː/	औ	au /aːu/	अं	aṃ /ⁿ/	अः	aḥ /h/

क	ka /k/	ख	kha /kʰ/	ग	ga /ɡ/	घ	gha /ɡʱ/	ङ	ṅa /ŋ/
च	ca /c, t͡ʃ/	छ	cha /cʰ, t͡ʃʰ/	ज	ja /ɟ, d͡ʒ/	झ	jha /ɟʱ, d͡ʒʱ/	ञ	ña /ɲ/
ट	ṭa /ʈ/	ठ	ṭha /ʈʰ/	ड	ḍa /ɖ/	ढ	ḍha /ɖʱ/	ण	ṇa /ɳ/
त	ta /t̪/	थ	tha /t̪ʰ/	द	da /d̪/	ध	dha /d̪ʱ/	न	na /n/
प	pa /p/	फ	pha /pʰ/	ब	ba /b/	भ	bha /bʱ/	म	ma /m/
य	ya /j/	र	ra /r/	ल	la /l/	व	va /ʋ/		
ष	ṣa /ʂ/	श	śa /ɕ, ʃ/	स	sa /s/	ह	ha /ɦ/		
ळ	ḷa //ɭ//	क्ष	kṣa /kʃ/	ज्ञ	jña /ɟʝɲ/				

== Dialects ==
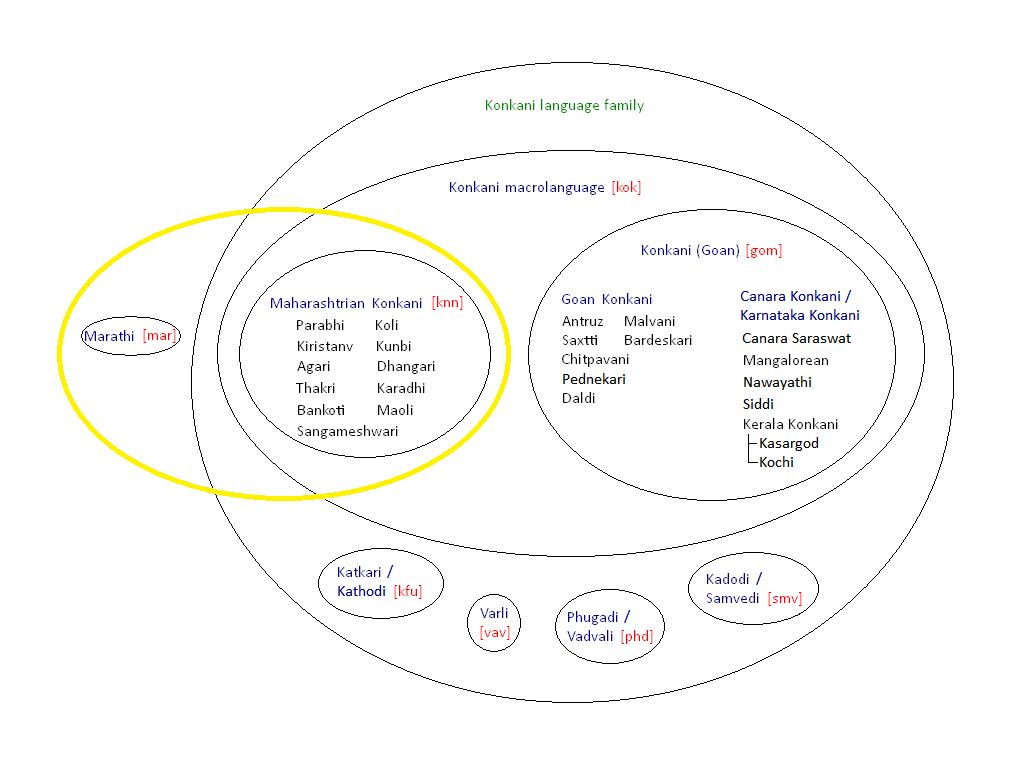
Venn diagram of the ISO codes of the Konkani languages

Konkani, despite having a small population, shows a very high number of dialects. The dialect tree structure of Konkani can easily be classified according to the region, religion, caste, and local tongue influence.

Based on the historical events and cultural ties of the speakers, N G Kalelkar has broadly classified the dialects into three main groups:

- Northern Konkani: Dialects spoken in Damaon, Diu & Silvassa territory and the Konkan division of Maharashtra with cultural ties to Mahratti.
- Central Konkani: Dialects in Goa, where Konkani came in close contact with Portuguese history & culture.
- Southern Konkani: Dialects spoken in Karnataka, and the Kassergode district & the Cochin district of Kerala. Southern Konkani has absorbed substantial amounts of loanwords from Kanarese, Tulu & Malabarese.

=== Goan Konkani ===
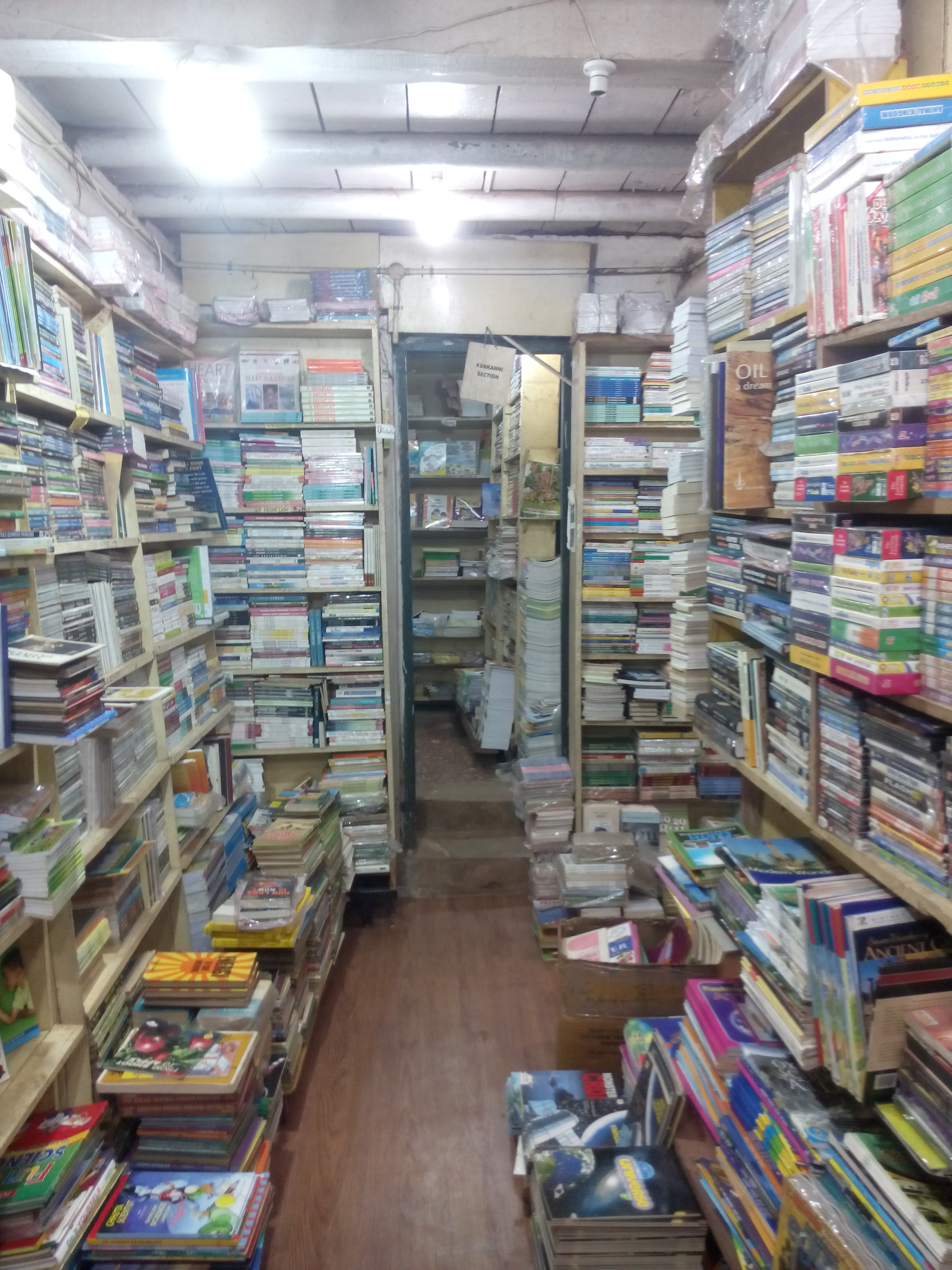
Entrance to Konkani section of the Golden Heart Emporium, Margao, Goa

Goan Konkani refers to all the central dialects of the Konkani macrolanguage except for those that fall under Maharashtri Konkani. These dialects are collectively assigned the language code gom under the ISO 639-3 classification.

In common usage, Goan Konkani refers collectively only to those dialects of Konkani spoken primarily in the state of Goa, for eg. The Antruz, Bardeskari & Saxtti dialects. But in the broader linguistic context, Goan Konkani also includes dialects spoken outside the official boundaries of Goa, such as Malvani Konkani, Chitpavani Konkani, Karwari Konkani, Mangalorean Konkani etc.

== Organisations ==
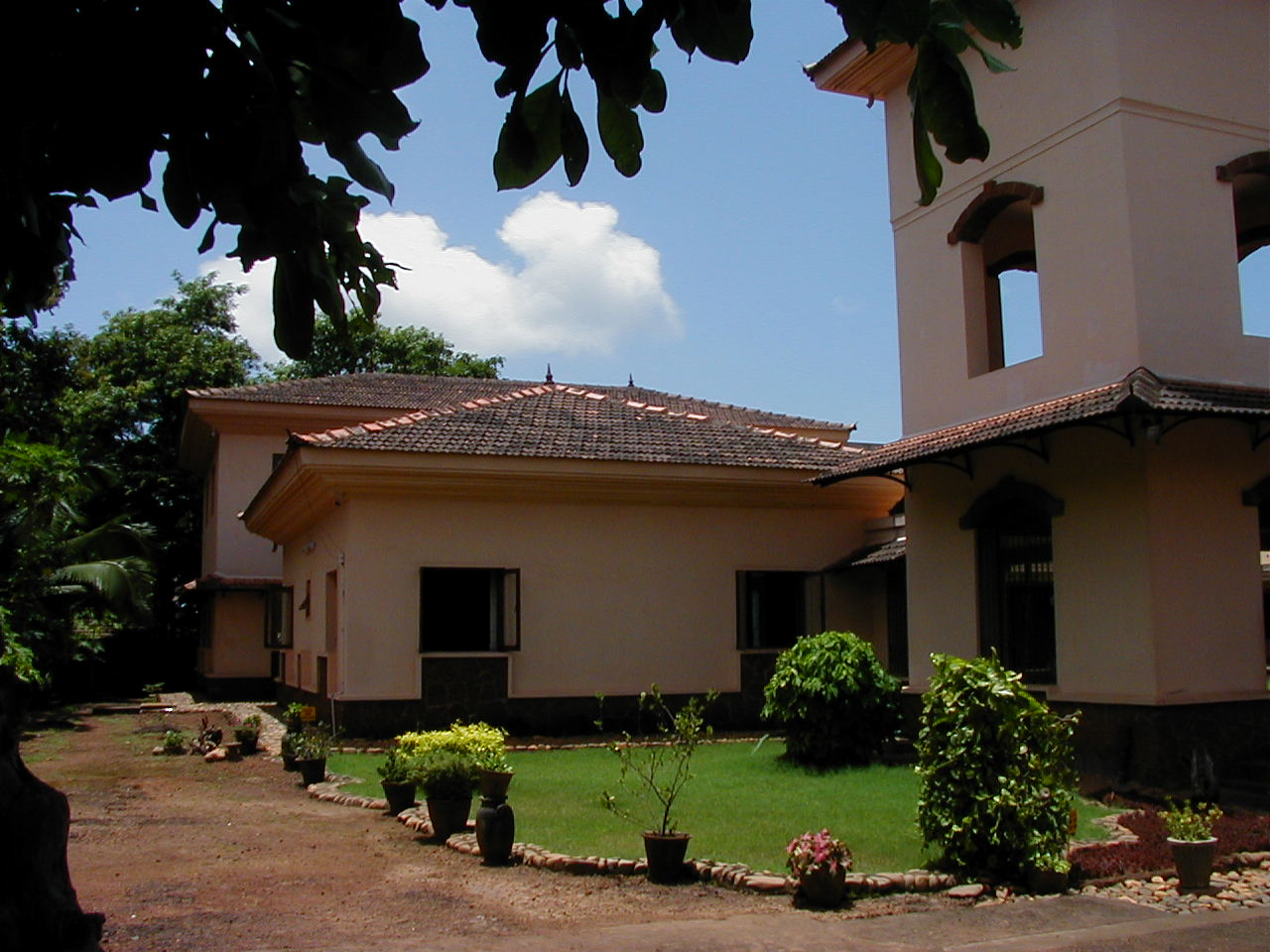
The campus of the Thomas Stephens Konknni Kendr (TSKK), a research institute working on issues related to the Konkani language, located at Alto Porvorim, near Panaji in Goa

There are organisations working for Konkani but, primarily, these were restricted to individual communities. The All India Konkani Parishad founded on 8 July 1939, provided a common ground for Konkani people from all regions. A new organisation known as Vishwa Konkani Parishad, which aims to be an all-inclusive and pluralistic umbrella organisation for Konkanis around the world, was founded on 11 September 2005.

Mandd Sobhann is the premier organisation that is striving hard to preserve, promote, propagate, and enrich the Konkani language and culture. It all began with the experiment called 'Mandd Sobhann' – a search for a Konkani identity in Konkani music on 30 November 1986 at Mangalore. What began as a performance titled 'Mandd Sobhann', grew into a movement of revival and rejuvenation of Konkani culture; and solidified into an organization called Mandd Sobhann. Today, Mandd Sobhann boasts of all these 3 identities namely - a performance, a movement and an organization. The Konkan Daiz Yatra, started in 1939 in Bombay (Mumbai), is the oldest Konkani organisation. The Konkani Bhasha Mandal was born in Mumbai on 5 April 1942, during the Third Adhiveshan of All India Konkani Parishad. On 28 December 1984, Goa Konkani Akademi (GKA) was founded by the government of Goa to promote Konkani language, literature, and culture. The Thomas Stephens Konknni Kendr (TSKK) is a popular research institute based in the Goan capital Panaji. It works on issues related to the Konkani language, literature, culture, and education. The Dalgado Konkani Academy is a popular Konkani organisation based in Panaji.

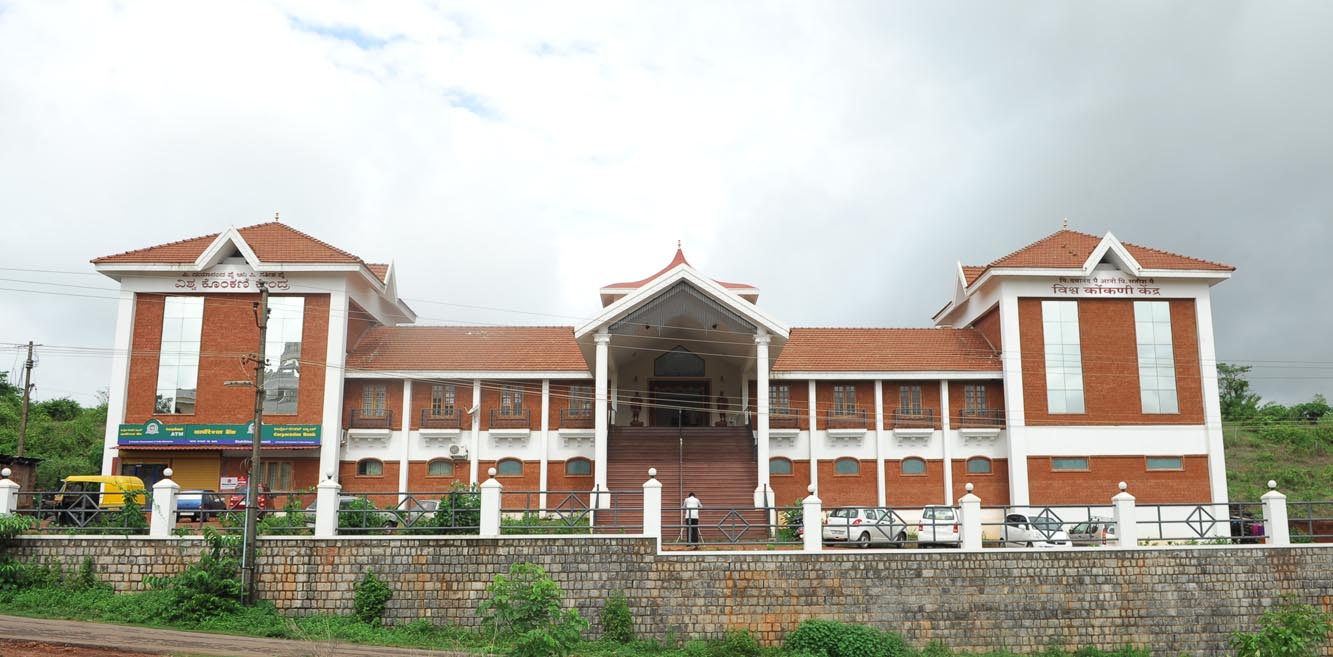
World Konkani Centre, Mangalore

The Konkani Triveni Kala Sangam is one more famed Konkani organisation in Mumbai, which is engaged in the vocation of patronising Konkani language through the theatre movement. The government of Karnataka established the Karnataka Konkani Sahitya Akademy on 20 April 1994. The Konkani Ekvott is an umbrella organisation of the Konkani bodies in Goa.

The First World Konkani Convention was held in Mangalore in December 1995. The Konkani Language and Cultural Foundation came into being immediately after the World Konkani Convention in 1995.

The World Konkani Centre built on a three-acre plot called Konkani Gaon (Konkani Village) at Shakti Nagar, Mangalore was inaugurated on 17 January 2009, "to serve as a nodal agency for the preservation and overall development of Konkani language, art, and culture involving all the Konkani people the world over."

The North American Konkani Association (NAKA) serves to unite Konkanis across the United States and Canada. It serves as a parent organization for smaller Konkani associations in various states. Furthermore, the Konkani Young Adult Group serves as a platform under NAKA to allow young adults across America (18+) of Konkani descent to meet each other and celebrate their heritage. Every 2–4 years, a Konkani Sammelan, where Konkanis from across the continent attend, is held in a different city in the US. A Konkani Youth Convention is held yearly. Past locations have included NYC and Atlanta; the upcoming youth convention is slated to be held in Chicago, IL in June.

== Literature ==
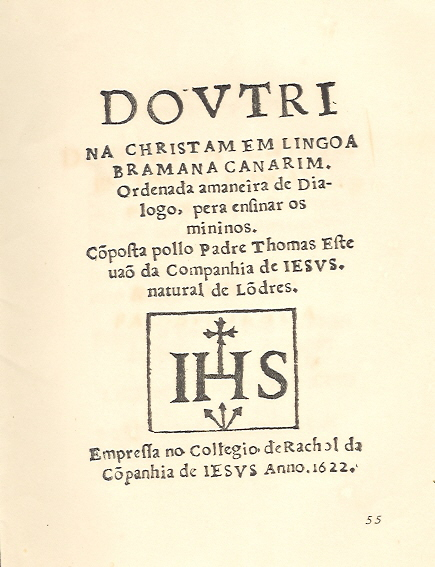
Cover of Dovtrina Christam by Fr. Thomas Stephens, first published work in Konkani, and any Indian language

During the Goa Inquisition which commenced in 1560, all books found in the Konkani language were burnt, and it is possible that old Konkani literature was destroyed as a consequence.

The earliest writer in the history of Konkani language known today is Krishnadas Shama from Quelossim in Goa. He began writing 25 April 1526, and he authored Ramayana, Mahabharata, and Krishnacharitrakatha in prose style. The manuscripts have not been found, although transliterations in Roman script are found in Braga in Portugal. The script used by him for his work is not known.

The first known printed book in Konkani was written by an English Jesuit priest, Fr. Thomas Stephens in 1622, and entitled Doutrina Christam em Lingoa Bramana Canarim (Old Portuguese for: Christian Doctrine in the Canarese Brahman Language). The first book exclusively on Konkani grammar, Arte da Lingoa Canarim, was printed in 1640 by Father Stephens in Portuguese.

== Media ==
=== Radio ===
All India Radio started broadcasting Konkani news and other services. Radio Goa Pangim started a Konkani broadcast in 1945. AIR Mumbai and Dharwad later started Konkani broadcasts in the years 1952 and 1965 respectively. Portuguese Radio, Lisbon started services in 1955 for India, East Africa, and Portugal. Similarly Trivandrum, Alleppey, Trichur, and Calicut AIR centres started Konkani broadcasts.

In Manglore and Udupi, many weekly news magazines are published in Konkani. Rakno, Daize, and a few others are very famous among the Christian community. Every Roman Catholic parish will publish three or four magazines in a year.

=== Print ===
Udentichem Sallok was the first Konkani periodical published in 1888, from Poona, by Eduardo Bruno de Souza. It started as a monthly and then as a fortnightly. It closed down in 1894.

==== Dailies ====
Sanjechem Nokhetr was started in 1907 by B. F. Cabral in Bombay, and is the first Concanim (or Konkani) newspaper. It contained detailed news of Bombay, British India, as it was published from there. In 1982, Novem Goem was a daily edited by Gurunath Kelekar, F. M. Rebello and Felicio Cardozo. It was started due to people's initiative. In 1989, Fr. Freddy J. da Costa, began a Konkani daily Goencho Avaz. It became a monthly after one and a half year. Presently there is just a single Konkani daily newspaper, called Bhaangar Bhuin. For a long time, there was another Konkani daily, Sunaparant, which was published in Panjim.

==== Weeklies ====
O Luzo-Concanim was a Concanim (Konkani)- Portuguese bilingual weekly, begun in 1891, by Aleixo Caitano José Francisco. From 1892 to 1897, A Luz, O Bombaim Esse, A Lua, "O Intra Jijent and O Opinião Nacional were bilingual Concanim- Portuguese weeklies published. In 1907, O Goano was putblished from Bombay by Honorato Furtado and Francis Xavier Furtado. It was a trilingual weekly in Portuguese, Konkani and English.

The Society of the Missionaries of Saint Francis Xavier, publish the Konkani weekly (satollem) named Vauraddeancho Ixtt. from Pilar. It was started in 1933 by Fr. Arsencio Fernandes and Fr. Graciano Moraes.

==== Fortnightly ====
There is a fortnightly published newspaper since 2007 called Kodial Khaber, edited by Venkatesh Baliga Mavinakurve and published by Baliga Publications, Mangalore.

==== Monthlies ====
Katolik Sovostkai was started in 1907 by Roldão Noronha. It later became a fortnightly before ceasing publication.

Dor Mhoineachi Rotti is the oldest running Konkani periodical. It is dedicated to the spreading of the devotion to the Sacred Heart of Jesus, and was initially named Dor Muineachi Rotti Povitra Jesucha Calzachem Devoçãõ Vaddounchi. Note that the til (tilde mark) over ãõ in Devoçãõ is one single til. Fr. Vincent Lobo, from Sangolda in Goa, who was then curator at the St. Patrick's Church in Karachi, began it in 1915, to feed the spiritual thirst and hunger of the large number of Konkani speaking people there, on noticing the absence of Konkani spiritual literature. The name was changed subsequently to "Dor Muiniachi Rotti, Concanim Messenger of the Sacred Heart". On Fr. Vincent Lobo's death on 11 November 1922, Fr. António Ludovico Pereira, also from Sangolda, took over the responsibility. Dor Mhoineachi Rotti had an estimated readership of around 12,000 people then. After the death of Fr. António Ludovico Pereira on 26 July 1936, Fr. Antanasio Moniz, from Verna, took over. On his death in 1953, Fr. Elias D'Souza, from Bodiem, Tivim in Goa became the fourth editor of Dor Mhoineachi Rotti. After shifting to Velha Goa in Goa around 1964, Fr. Moreno de Souza was editor for around 42 years. Presently the Dor Mhuineachi Rotti is owned by the Jesuits in Goa, edited by Fr. Vasco do Rego, S. J. and printed and published by Fr. Jose Silveira, S.J. on behalf of the Provincial Superior of the Jesuits in Goa. Dor Mhoineachi Rotti will complete 100 years on 1 January 2015.

Gulab is a monthly from Goa. It was started by late Fr. Freddy J. da Costa in 1983, and was printed in colour, then uncommon.

Konkani periodicals published in Goa include Vauraddeancho Ixtt (Roman script, weekly), Gulab (Roman script, monthly), Bimb (Devanagari script, monthly), Panchkadayi (Kannada script, monthly) and Poddbimb (Roman script, monthly). Konkani periodicals published in Mangalore include "Raknno" (Kannada script, weekly), "DIVO" (Kannada Script, weekly from Mumbai), "Kutmacho Sevak" (Kannada script, monthly), "Dirvem" (Kannada script, monthly),"Amcho Sandesh" (Kannada script, monthly) and "Kajulo" (Kannda script, children's magazine, monthly). Konkani periodical published in Udupi include "Uzwad" (Kannada script, monthly) and Naman Ballok Jezu (Kannada script, monthly). Ekvottavorvim Uzvadd (Devanagari Script, monthly) is published from Belgaum since 1998. Panchkadayi Konkani Monthly magazine from Manipal since 1967.

=== Digital and audible ===
The first complete literary website in Konkani started in 2001 using Kannada script was www.maaibhaas.com by Naveen Sequeira of Brahmavara. In 2003 www.daaiz.com started by Valley Quadros Ajekar from Kuwait, this literary portal was instrumental in creating a wider range of readers across the globe, apart from various columns, literary contests, through Ashawadi Prakashan, he published several books in Konkani, including the first e-book 'Sagorachea Vattecheo Zori' released by Gerry DMello Bendur in 2005 at Karkala.

www.poinnari.com is the first literary webportal in Konkani using three scripts (Kannada, Nagari and Romi), started in 2015, is also conducted the first National level literary contest in dual scripts in Konkani in 2017.

'Sagorachea Vattecheo Zori' is the first e-book in Konkani, a compilation of 100 poems digitally published by www.daaiz.com and digitally published in 2005 by Ashawadi Prakashan in Karkala.

'Kathadaaiz' is the first digital audio book digitally published in 2018 by www.poinnari.com. This audio book is also available in the YouTube channel of Ashawari Prakashan.

'Pattim Gamvak' is the first e-Novel written in Kannada script Konkani in 2002 by Valley Quadros Ajekar from Kuwait, published in www.maaibhaas.com in 2002–3.

'Veez' is the first digital weekly in Konkani, started in 2018 by Austine D'Souza Prabhu in Chicago, USA. Veez is the only magazine publishing Konkani in 4 scripts; Kannada, Nagari, Romi and Malayalam.

=== Television ===
The Doordarshan centre in Panjim produces Konkani programs, which are broadcast in the evening. Many local Goan channels also broadcast Konkani television programs. These include: Prudent Media, Goa 365, HCN, RDX Goa, and others.

=== Music ===
On 1 February 2024, the song 'Addicted' by EZD and Chrystal Farrell entered Spotify charts of UAE at 3rd position alongside artists like Taylor Swift and The Weeknd, creating a record of becoming the first ever Konkani song on the charts.

== In popular culture ==
Many Konkani songs of the Goan fisher-folk appear recurrently in a number of Hindi films. Many Hindi movies feature characters with a Goan Catholic accent. A famous song from the 1957 movie Aasha, contains the Konkani words "mhaka naka" and became extremely popular. Children were chanting "Eeny, meeny, miny, moe", which inspired C Ramchandra and his assistant John Gomes to create the first line of the song, "Eena Meena Deeka, De Dai Damanika". Gomes, who was a Goan, added the words "mhaka naka" (Konkani for "I don't want"). They kept on adding more nonsense rhymes until they ended with "Rum pum po!".

An international ad campaign by Nike for the 2007 Cricket World Cup featured a Konkani song "Rav Patrao Rav" as the background theme. It was based on the tune of an older song "Bebdo", composed by Chris Perry and sung by Lorna Cordeiro. The new lyrics were written by Agnello Dias (who worked in the ad agency that made the ad), recomposed by Ram Sampat, and sung by Ella Castellino.

A Konkani cultural event called "Konkani Nirantari", was conducted by Mandd Sobhann, a Mangalorean Christian organisation founded in 1986 AD. The event was held at Mangalore on 26 and 27 January 2008, it entered the Guinness Book of World Records for holding a 40-hour-long non-stop Konkani musical marathon; beating a Brazilian musical troupe, who had previously held the record of singing non-stop for 36 hours.

== See also ==
- Bombay East Indian dialect
- Southern Saraswat Konkani
- Konkani in the Roman script
- Konkani Language Agitation
- Konkani people
- Konkani phonology
- Konkani Poets
- Konkani Scripts
- List of loanwords in Konkani
- Languages of India
- Languages with official status in India
- List of languages by number of native speakers in India
- Maharashtri
- Malvani people
- Marathi–Konkani languages
- Paisaci
- Sahitya Akademi Award to Konkani Writers
- World Konkani Centre
- World Konkani Hall of Fame
