= Konkani alphabets =

Scripts to write the Konkani language

Konkani alphabets refers to the five different scripts (Devanagari, Roman, Kannada, Malayalam and Perso-Arabic scripts) currently used to write the Konkani language.

As of 1987, the "Goan Antruz dialect" in the Devanagari script has been declared Standard Konkani and promulgated as an official language in the Indian state of Goa. Konkani in the Roman script is not mandated as an official script by law. However, an ordinance passed by the government of Goa allows the use of Roman script for official communication. This ordinance has been put into effect by various ministries in varying degrees. For example, the 1996 Goa Panchayat Rules stipulate that the various forms used in the election process must be in both the Roman and Devanagari script. Although Konkani is spoken by 2.3 million to 2.5 million people, its scripts are usually dismissed in the modern age, with people often resorting to writing in Hindi (in phonetic sense) or Kannada.

== Ancient ==
The earliest inscription in Konkani in Goykanadi script (extinct now) is of the Gupta period in the 2nd century CE found at Aravalem, Goa. It reads

śacipurācē śirasi

(On the top of Shachipura)

The famous inscription at the foot of the colossal Jain monolith Gomaṭēśvara (Bāhubali) Konkani: gomṭo - pretty masc., īśvar - God at Shravanabelagola of 981 CE reads,

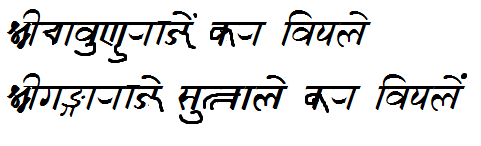
śrīcāvuṇḍarājē̃ kara viyālē̃, śrīgaṅgārājē̃ suttālē̃ kara viyālē̃

(Chavundaraya got it done, Gangaraya got it done again.)

At the foot of the Gommateshwara at Shravanabelagola there are two inscriptions. One on the right foot and one on the left. On the right foot the inscription is written in old Kannada. On the left foot it is in Devanagari.

== Present ==
The rules for writing Konkani in the Devanagari script are elucidated in a book released by the Goa Konkani Academy titled kōṅkaṇī śuddhalēkhanācē nēm. While the rules for writing Konkani in the Roman script are elucidated in a book titled thomas sṭīvans koṅkaṇi kēndr Romi Lipi by writer Pratap Naik, released by Konkani singer Ullās Buyā̃v at Dalgado Konkani Academy and in Romi Lipient Konknni Kors.

=== Vowels and syllabic consonants ===
Short vowel							Long vowel						
dev.	kan.	mal.	romi	ara.	IAST	IPA	dev.	kan.	mal.	romi	ara.	IAST	IPA
अ	ಅ	അ	(ø or o)	ا،ع	a	/ɐ/	आ	ಆ	ആ	a	آ	ā	/ɑː/
इ	ಇ	ഇ	i	?	i	/i/	ई	ಈ	ഈ	i	ي	ī	/iː/
उ	ಉ	ഉ	u	?	u	/u/	ऊ	ಊ	ഊ	u	و	ū	/uː/
ऋ	ಋ	ഋ	ru	?	ṛ	/ɹ̩/	ॠ	ೠ	ൠ	?	?	ṝ	/ɹ̩ː/
ऌ	ಌ	ഌ	?	?	ḷ	/l̩/	ॡ	ೡ	ൡ	?	?	ḹ	/l̩ː/
ऍ	?	?	e	?	ê	/æ/	—						
ऎ	ಎ	എ	(ê or e)	اے	e	/e/	ए	ಏ	ഏ	(ê or e)	اے	ē	/eː/
—							ऐ	ಐ	ഐ	oi	اے	ai	/ʌj/
ऑ	?	?	o	?	ô	/æ/	—						
ऒ	ಒ	ഒ	(ô or o)	او	o	/o/	ओ	ಓ	ഓ	(ô or o)	او	ō	/oː/
—							औ	ಔ	ഔ	ov	او	au	/ʌʋ/

==== Observations ====
- ॠ, ऌ and ॡ are rarely used in Konkani except to render tatsam words. e.g. कॣप्त (imagined-derivative of कल्पना)
- Under Portuguese rule, the Konkani language was modified to fit the Roman syllabary system. As a result, Roman orthography has eliminated or deformed some original Konkani sounds. e.g.
1. अ, ओ and ऑ are most often rendered in the Roman script by single letter o. e.g.:
  - अ - करता kartā is written as korta or even corta (also written as kørta, preserving the original konkani vowel)
  - ओ - दोन dōn is written as don.
  - ऑ - पोरनें pornẽ is written as pornem
2. ऍ and ए are rendered by e and ê respectively, but most often to make it easy, both vowels are rendered by e in the Roman script. However, the same deformation is rendered by the Devanagari script as both the syllables ऍ and ए are written as े (ए). E.g. मेज (count) and मेज (table).
3. ऍ - कॅनरा kænarā is written as Kanara or Canara.
- In the Roman script, Nasal vowels in certain cases are represented by a tilde (~) above the character e.g. pãy (foot). However, the usage of tilde (~) is to be used less. If the vowel at the end of a word is nasalized (if the word ends with a nasal vowel), use m after the vowel. If the m in the final position of word is supposed to be pronounced as a consonant, use m'. If the vowel in the middle of the word is nasalized (i.e. non-final vowel), use n, except when the nasal vowel precedes p, b, f, n. E.g. kombi, unddo, ganv, hatamni.
- For explicit differentiation, closed vowels (ए and ओ) are represented with a circumflex (ê and ô), while open vowels (ऍ and ऑ) are represented by (e and o). However, the circumflex is sometimes omitted if it is expected that the reader will know the correct vowel sound.

=== Consonants ===
	Plosive								Nasal		Approximant		Fricative				Affricative			
Voicing →	Unvoiced				Voiced								Unvoiced		Voiced		Unvoiced		Voiced	
Aspiration →	Unaspirated		Aspirated		Unaspirated		Aspirated		Unaspirated				Aspirated				Unaspirated		Aspirated	
Guttural	क-ಕ-Ka-க-ک	ka /k/	ख-ಖ-Kha-ഖ-كھ	kha /kʰ/	ग-ಗ-Ga-ഗ-گ	ga /ɡ/	घ-ಘ-Gha-ഘ-گھ	gha /ɡʱ/	ङ-ಞ-Nga-ങ-?	ṅa /ŋ/					ह-ಹ-Ha-ഹ-ہ،ح	ha /ɦ/				
Palatal	च-ಚ-Cha-ച-چ	ca /c/	छ-ಛ-Chha-ഛ-چھ	cha /cʰ/	ज-ಜ-Ja-ജ-ج	ja /ɟ,/	झ-ಝ-Jha-ഝ-جھ	jha /ɟʱ/	ञ-ಙ-Nja-ഞ-?	ña /ɲ/	य-ಯ-Ya-യ-ي	ya /j/	श-ಶ-Sha, Xa-ശ-ش	śa /ɕ, ʃ/						
Retroflex	ट-ಟ-Tta-ട-ٹ	ṭa /ʈ/	ठ-ಠ-Ttha-ഠ-ٹھ	ṭha /ʈʰ/	ड-ಡ-Dda-ഡ-ڈ	ḍa /ɖ/	ढ-ಢ-Ddha-ഢ-ڈھ	ḍha /ɖʱ/	ण-ಣ-Nna-ണ-?	ṇa /ɳ/	र-ರ-Ra-ര-ر	ra /r/	ष-ಷ-Xa-ഷ-?	ṣa /ʂ/						
Dental	त-ತ-Ta-ത-ط،ت	ta /t̪/	थ-ಥ-Tha-ഥ-تھ	tha /t̪ʰ/	द-ದ-Da-ദ-د	da /d̪/	ध-ಧ-Dha-ധ-دھ	dha /d̪ʱ/	न-ನ-Na-ന-ن	na /n/	ल-ಲ-La-ല-ل	la /l/	स-ಸ-Sa-സ-ص،س	sa /s/						
Labial	प-ಪ-Pa-പ-پ	pa /p/	फ-ಫ-Pha-ഫ-پھ	pha /pʰ/	ब-ಬ-Ba-ബ-ب	ba /b/	भ-ಭ-Bha-ഭ-بھ	bha /bʱ/	म-ಮ-Ma-മ-م	ma /m/	व-ವ-Va-വ-و	va /ʋ/								
Alveolar																	च़-?-Cha-?-?	ca /t͡ʃ/	ज़-?-Za-?-ز،ظ،ذ	ja /d͡ʒ/
Labiodental													फ़-ಫ಼-Fa-ف	fa /f/						
Retroflex Lateral flap											ळ-ಳ-Lla-ള-?	ḷa /ɺ̢/								

==== Observations ====
- ಚ and ച in the Kannada and Malayalam scripts respectively, render two sounds, (c) and (t͡ʃ).
- ಜ and ജ in the Kannada and Malayalam scripts respectively, render two sounds, (ɟ) and (d͡ʒ).
- In the Roman script, a retroflex consonant is got by simply doubling the corresponding dental consonant; e.g. त - ta, ट - Tta.
- Roman Konkani does not distinguish between श and ष. Both are written as Sha or Xa and pronounced as श.
- Roman Konkani does not distinguish between फ and फ़. Both are normally written as F and pronounced accordingly. e.g. tomorrow फाल्लॆक (phāllek)- fallek (fāllek)
- ن nūn in the Nawayati Konkani script not only is a separate consonant, but also performs the role of the anusvāra. It indicates a homorganic nasal preceding another consonant; e.g. رنگ raṅg, انڈو aṇḍo. It also undergoes nasalisation; e.g. ہانؤ hāṃv.
- ع, 'ayin غ ghayin and ح he in the Nawayati Konkani script are used for incorporated Perso-Arabic words.
- Joined characters are denoted with an apostrophe ('), e.g., mell'lo. m followed by an apostrophe at the end of a word indicates that the m consonant is to be pronounced, and that it is not a nasal vowel, e.g. kam'.

=== Nasal consonants and nasalisation ===
In Konkani, the anusvāra ं ṃ is traditionally defined as representing a nasal stop homorganic to a following plosive,(anunāsika) and also vowel nasalisation. The precise phonetic value of the phoneme is dependent on the phonological environment. Word-finally, it is realized as nasalization of the preceding vowel (e.g. bā̃yi [bãːyi], "a well"). It results in vowel nasalization also medially between a short vowel and a non-obstruent (tũvẽ [tʊ̃ʋe] "you (acc.)"). It is pronounced as a homorganic nasal, with the preceding vowel becoming nasalized allophonically, in the following cases: between a long vowel and a voiced stop (tāṃbo [taːmbo] "copper", cāṃdī [tʃaːndiː] "silver"), between a long vowel and a voiceless stop (dāṃt [daːnt] "tooth"), and also between a short vowel and an obstruent (sāṃbayi- [saːmbay] "to support", The last rule has two sets of exceptions where the anusvāra effects only a nasalization of the preceding short vowel. Words from the first set are morphologically derived from words with a long nasalized vowel (mā̃s [mãs], "meat". In such cases the vowel is sometimes denasalized ([maːs]. The second set is composed of a few words like (pā̃vcẽ [pãʋtʃɛ̃], "to arrive".)

=== Avagraha (ऽ) ===
Konkani is one of the few modern Indo-Aryan languages to apply the avagraha beyond mere sustenance of an exclamation, cry or shout in speech. It is used by verbs in continuous tense. The avagraha is not used in Standard Konkani in the continuous tense. Its use is however popular and prevalent amongst the Canara Saraswats, both Gaud and Bhanap, writing in their native Amchigele dialect, in the continuous tense with the aim of conforming to the schwa deletion rule.

Sentence	Konkani in Devanagari
He was doing	तॊ करतलॊऽशिलॊ
He is doing	तॊ करतऽसा
He will be doing	तॊ करतलॊऽसतलॊ

(According to the schwa deletion rule in Indo-Aryan languages, करत आसा will be read as karat āsā and not as karta'sā as prevalent pronunciation is.)

The avagraha is also used to mark the non-elision of word-final inherent a, which otherwise is a modern orthographic convention: बैसऽ baisa "sit" versus बैस bais.

=== Schwa deletion ===
The IPA symbol for the schwa

The schwa deletion or schwa syncope phenomenon plays a crucial role in Konkani and several other Indo-Aryan languages, where schwas implicit in the written scripts of those languages are obligatorily deleted for correct pronunciation. Schwa syncope is extremely important in these languages for intelligibility and unaccented speech. It also presents a challenge to non-native speakers and speech synthesis software because the scripts, including Nagar Barap, do not provide indicators of where schwas should be dropped.

This means the schwa ('ə') implicit in each consonant of the script is "obligatorily deleted" at the end of words and in certain other contexts, unlike in Sanskrit. This phenomenon has been termed the "schwa syncope rule" or the "schwa deletion rule" of Konkani. In other words, when a vowel-preceded consonant is followed by a vowel-succeeded consonant, the schwa inherent in the first consonant is deleted. However, this formalization is inexact and incomplete (i.e. sometimes deletes a schwa when it shouldn't or, at other times, fails to delete it when it should), and can yield errors. Schwa deletion is computationally important because it is essential to building text-to-speech software for Konkani. Without the appropriate deletion of schwas, any speech output would sound unnatural.

It has been proposed that the character ø could be used in Konkani in the Roman script to denote the schwa o sound, as against the regular vowel o sound. For example, the word बरो would be spelt as børo rather than boro. This would facilitate automatic transliteration from the Roman script to other script, and would also make the Roman script the only script capable of indicating schwa retention and deletion.

==== Vowel nasalization ====
With some words that contain /n/ or /m/ consonants separated from succeeding consonants by schwas, the schwa deletion process has the effect of nasalizing any preceding vowels. Some examples in Konkani include:

- jẽvaṇ => jẽvlo

==== Schwa rules ====
1. The final inherent अ is generally omitted. E.g. देव is dēv, not dēva.
2. Schwa is retained in single letter words. E.g. क is ka, not k.
3. Schwa is omitted if the next letter is a consonant conjunct. E.g. आमच्या is Āmcyā, not Āmacyā.
4. Schwa is retained in the second letter of a three letter word that ends अ. E.g. करप is karap, not karp.
5. Schwa is omitted from the second letter of a three letter word that ends with a vowel other than अ. E.g. चॆरकॊ is cerko, not cerako.
6. Schwa is omitted from the second letter of a word with four letters. E.g. करपाची is karpāci, not karapāci.
7. Schwa is retained in the third letter of a word with four letters, if the final letter ends with a vowel other than अ. E.g. आंगवणी is Āṅgvaṇī, not Āṅgvṇī.
8. Verb roots always end in a consonant even if they undergo declination. e.g. आपंव +चॆं= आपंवचॆं, hence one says āpãvcẽ not āpãvacẽ , आपय+ता=आपयता, hence we say āpaytā not āpayatā.

As a result of schwa syncope, the Konkani pronunciation of many words differs from that expected from a literal Sanskrit-style rendering of Devanagari. For instance, करता is kartā not karatā, आपयता is āpaytā not āpayatā', वेद is vēd not vēda and मिरसांग is mirsāṅg not mirasāṅga.

For instance, the letter sequence ळब is pronounced differently in मळब (sky) and मळबार (in the sky). In मळब, there is no schwa deletion for the letter ळ, since it is the second letter in a three letter word that ends with अ. Hence it is pronounced as maḷab. In मळबार, the letter ळ has schwa deletion since it is the second letter of a word with four letters. Hence it is pronounced as maḷbār. While native speakers correctly pronounce the sequences differently in different contexts, non-native speakers and voice-synthesis software can make them "sound unnatural", making it difficult for the listener to grasp the intended meaning.

== Proposed scripts ==
There have been various proposals to have a script specifically for Konkani. In 1965, S. V. Raykar from Sirsi in Karnataka devised a distinctive script for Konkani by combining features of the Devanagari and Kannada scripts. Similarly, in 2020, Ronan Lewis from Udupi created a unique script for Konkani using alphabets from various languages including Arabic, French and Hebrew. There is also a movement to revive the Goykanadi script and a proposal has been made to introduce a Unicode block for Goykanadi. In 1993, Gajanana Ghantkar wrote the book History of Goa through Gõykanadi script, which has many historical Konkani documents written in Goykanadi, along with its Devanagari transliteration.

== See also ==
- Konkani phonology
- Konkani language
- Konkani language agitation
- Goykanadi
