= Konkani language agitation =

Protests in Goa, Daman and Diu, India

The Konkani language agitations were a series of protests led by Goans between 1961 and 1987 that advocated for Konkani as the official language in the former union territory of Goa, Daman and Diu. It involved citizen journalism, student activism, and political demonstrations; as Konkani was denied official status, even after it was established that Konkani is not a dialect of Marathi in 1975.

The civil unrest ceased after Konkani, in the Devnagari script, was granted premier official status and Marathi was declared an associate official language of Goa.

== History ==
=== Pre-Portuguese Goa ===
Historically, Konkani was neither the official nor the administrative language of the pre-Portuguese rulers. Under the Kadambas (c. 960 – 1310), the court language was Kannada. When under Muslim rule (1312 - 1370 and 1469 - 1510), the official and cultural language was Persian. Various stones in the Archaeological Museum and Portrait Gallery from the period are inscribed in Kannada and Persian. During the period in between the two periods of Muslim rule, the Vijayanagara Empire, which had control of the state, mandated the use of Kannada and Telugu.

=== Portuguese Goa ===
The Konkani language had originally been studied and Romi Konkani was promoted by Catholic Christian missionaries in Goa, especially by Thomas Stephens; as a medium of communication during the 16th century. In the 17th century, the Mahratta Confederacy's threat was compounded by their repeated attacks on native Goan Christians and the destruction of local churches. This made the Portuguese government initiate a programme for the suppression of Konkani in Goa, in order to make native Catholic Christians identify fully with the Portuguese Empire in the East. As a result, Konkani was suppressed and rendered unprivileged in Goa by the enforcement of Portuguese.

Urged by the Franciscans, the Portuguese viceroy forbade the use of Konkani on 27 June 1684; he further decreed that within three years, the local people in general would speak the Portuguese language and use it in all their contacts and contracts made in Portuguese territories. The penalties for violation would be imprisonment. The decree was confirmed by the king on 17 March 1687. However, according to the Inquisitor António Amaral Coutinho's letter to the Portuguese monarch João V in 1731, these draconian measures were unsuccessful.

The fall of the Province of the North (today Greater Bombay), which included Bassein (Vasai), Chaul & Salsette Island in 1739; led to the suppression of Konkani gaining new strength. On 21 November 1745, the Archbishop of Goa and Daman, Lourenço de Santa Maria e Melo of OFM, decreed that fluency in Portuguese was mandatory for Goan applicants to priesthood & also for all of their immediate relatives. This language fluency would be confirmed via rigorous examinations by ordained priests. Furthermore, the Bamonns and Chardos were required to learn Portuguese within six months, failing which they would be denied the right to marriage. The Jesuits who had historically been the greatest advocates of Konkani, were expelled from Goa by the Marquis of Pombal in 1759. In 1812, the Archbishop decreed that children should be prohibited from speaking Konkani in parochial schools. In 1847, this rule was extended to seminaries. In 1869, Konkani was completely banned also in state-run schools until Portugal became a Republic in 1910.

The result of this linguistic displacement was that Hindu and Christian elites of Goa turned to Marathi and Portuguese, respectively. Konkani in Goa became the língua de criados (language of the servants). However, Konkani continued to have some support among Portuguese government officials. Joaquim Heliodoro da Cunha Rivara believed that the Portuguese language could be better diffused in Goa by using the local languages, Konkani and Marathi in particular, as mediums of public instruction. Soon after his arrival in Goa, he asserted this belief in an inaugural conference of the Escola Normal of Nova Goa (Panjim), on 1 October 1856. The text of this speech may be found in the Boletim do Governo, n.º 78.

Considering Konkani in looming danger of being sidelined, Vāman Vardē Śeṇai Vaḷavalikār, popularly known as Śeṇai Goyẽbāb (or Shenoi Goembab) gave a clarion call for the revival of Konkani in the early 20th century. Under his guidance, a steady movement was built up to rejuvenate Konkani language and heritage, by means of establishing a common cultural identity among the Konkani people.

=== Goa after Indian annexation ===
The annexation of Goa in 1961 saw the official removal of Portuguese and its replacement by English for administrative purposes. Better off Goans, irrespective of their religious beliefs, started sending their wards to English medium schools. Marathi medium schools remained popular with low-caste Hindus, who looked at Marathi with reverence as the language in which Hindu scriptures, translated from Sanskrit could be accessed. A claim about Konkani being a Marathi dialect and Konkani speakers being Marathis began to take shape. Although Konkani preserved an older stage of phonetic development, and showed a greater variety of verbal forms than standard Marathi; Europeans like John Leyden, Indians like A K Priolkar claimed that Konkani was a dialect of Marathi or Maharashtri, it later proved false as Konkani was found to be an independent language & given official status.

== Konkani versus Marathi ==
The roots of the Konkani Language agitation lay in the denial of Konkani as an independent language and the attempts to merge Goa into Maharashtra. Konkani was not taken seriously as a potential official language except by a few Goans. By 1960, pro-Konkani and pro-Marathi groups started a propaganda war through distribution of pamphlets. In 1962, the All India Konkani Parishad held its eighth session for the first time at Maḍgā̃v (Margao) in post-liberation Goa and passed a resolution urging the Kendra Sahitya Akademi to recognise Konkani.

The then Chief Minister of Goa, Dayanand Bandodkar, appointed a committee in 1966 to examine the feasibility of declaring Marathi as the sole official language of Goa. Attempts were made by some members of his Maharashtrawadi Gomantak Party (MGP), to pass a Goa, Daman and Diu Official Language Bill in 1966 which failed. Simultaneously, the 1967 Goa status referendum thwarted the MGP's planned merger of Goa into Maharashtra. On 22 August 1970, Bandodkar declared Konkani, written in the Devanagari script, as the official language of Goa along with Marathi.

Dayanand Bandodkar died in 1973, and his daughter Shashikala Kakodkar became the new Chief Minister of Goa. Under Kakodkar, government policies favouring Marathi were framed. Marathi was made compulsory in all schools in Goa whilst Konkani was excluded. This policy was met with severe criticism from Konkani organisations within Goa and outside. Although promises were made by Kakodkar in 1977 and thereafter by then Congress Chief Minister Pratapsingh Rane in 1980 to treat Konkani at par with Marathi, the matter was kept in abeyance till 1986.

== Koṅkaṇī Prajētso Āvāz ==
In their election manifesto, the Congress party had stated that once statehood was achieved Konkani would be recognised as an official language and demands would be made to include it in the Eighth Schedule of the Indian Constitution. In 1980, the Congress came into power under Chief Minister Pratapsingh Rane. Rane, despite the promises made, procrastinated on the issue. This led to an agitation in 1986 on the streets popularly called koṅkaṇī prajētso āvāz (voice of the Konkani people). Goa witnessed the bloodiest agitation ever, the Language agitation, in which seven pro-Konkani agitators lost their lives and several were injured. The civil disobedience only halted when the Goa, Daman and Diu Official Language bill was presented to the legislative assembly.

== Government action ==
The Goa, Daman and Diu Official Language bill, presented to the legislative assembly in 1986, was passed on 4 February 1987 declaring Konkani the sole official language of the Union Territory of Goa, Daman and Diu with provisions for Marathi and Gujarati for Daman and Diu. On 30 May 1987 Goa got statehood with Konkani as the sole official language. The Kendra Sahitya Academy recognised Konkani, in the Devanagari script, as an independent language on 26 February 1975. This paved the way for the decision to include Konkani in the Eighth Schedule of the Indian Constitution making Konkani one of the official languages of India.

== Karnataka and Kerala ==
The struggle for Konkani in Goa, did not go unnoticed in Canara and Travancore. The Konkani speakers in Canara (currently Uttara Kannada, Udupi and Dakshina Kannada) and Travancore (currently Cochin and Ernakulam), inspired by the writings of Shenoi Goembab were getting increasingly aware on the issue of mother tongue.

The first public pro-Konkani gathering was held outside Goa and by non Goan Konkanis. In 1939, the All India Konkani Parishad was founded by the efforts of Manjunath Shanbhag and the first session was held. This was followed by the second session at Udupi organised by T.M.A. Pai. The liberation and subsequent statehood of Goa bolstered Konkani's status in Karnataka. In 1962, the Konkani Bhasha Prachar Sabha, Cochin, took up the issue of inclusion of Konkani in the Eighth schedule with the Government of India and the Linguistic Minorities Commission. In 1976, the Konkani Bhasha Mandali was founded at Mangalore enhance the status of Konkani in the state. In 1994, the Government of Karnataka founded the Karnataka Konkani Sahitya Academy at Mangalore to propagate Konkani literature. The first Vishwa Konkani Sammelan was held in Mangalore in 1995 wherein 5,000 delegated from 75 centres from India, the middle east, the US, UK, etc. participated.

In 2005, the foundation was laid for a World Konkani Centre to further the cause of Konkani on a global scale. From the academic year 2007–2008, Konkani has become an optional subject in the schools of Karnataka.

== See also ==
- Konkani alphabets
- Languages of India
- History of Goa
- Konkani cinema
