= History of Goa =

The present-day state of Goa was established in 1987. Goa is India's smallest state by area. It shares a lot of similarities with Indian history, especially with regard to colonial influences and a multi-cultural aesthetic.

The Usgalimal rock engravings, belonging to the Upper Paleolithic or Mesolithic periods, exhibit some of the earliest traces of human settlement in India. The Mauryan and Satavahana Empires ruled modern-day Goa during the Iron Age. It was ruled by the Kadambha dynasty from the 2nd century CE to 1312 and by the Deccan from 1312 to 1367. The city was then annexed by the Kingdom of Vijayanagara and was later conquered by the Bahmanī sultanate, which founded Old Goa on the island in 1440.

The Portuguese invaded Goa in 1510, defeated the Bijapur Sultanate. The Portuguese rule lasted for about 450 years, and heavily influenced Goan culture, cuisine, and architecture. In 1961, India took control over Goa after a 36-hour battle and integrated it into India. The area of Goa was incorporated into Goa, Daman and Diu, which included the Damaon territory in the north of the Konkan region. In 1987, following the Konkani language agitation Goa was granted statehood. Goa has one of the highest GDP per capita and Human Development Index among Indian states.

== Earliest history ==
There is evidence of the tectonic origins of Goa dating back to 10,000 BC. Further, evidence of human occupation of Goa dates back at least to the Lower Paleolithic Age, indicated by the archaeological findings of Acheulean bifaces in the Mandovi-Zuari basin. However, evidence suggesting the region's ancient foundation is obscured by the legend of Goa's creation by the Hindu sage Parashurama.

=== Geological origins ===
Some parts of present-day Goa appear to have been uplifted from the sea due to geological tectonic plate movement. There is evidence to support this theory as indicated by the presence of marine fossils, buried seashells, and other features of reclaimed topography in the coastal belt. fossilized branches have been found later in many villages on the foothills of the Sahyadri dating back more than 10,000 BC. Thus the geologists concluded that Goa has risen from the seabed as a result of violent tectonic movements. At the decline of the intensity of population in the last Pleistocene age around 10000 BC, the bottom of Deccan Plateau was lifted up and out of sea-waters by the tectonic movements, formed the West-coast of India, Goa being a part thereof.

== Prehistory ==
=== Paleolithic and Mesolithic era ===
Until 1993 the existence of humans in Goa during the Paleolithic and Mesolithic period was highly debated. The discovery of rock art engravings on lateritic platforms and granite boulders from Usgalimal on the banks of west-flowing river in Kushavati, has shed light on the prehistory of Goa. The rock shelter at Usgalimal has enough space for 25 to 30 people. The perennial stream in the vicinity which might have served Stone Age man for centuries as a source of water. An anthropomorphic figure of Mother goddess and tectiforms resembling tree-like motifs have been found. This site was discovered by Dr P.P.Shirodkar. Exploration of several Mesolithic sites of the Mandovi-Zuari basin, at other sites such as Keri, Thane, Anjuna, Mauxim, Kazur in Quepem, Virdi, has led to the discovery of several scrapers, points, bores, cones, etc. A hand axe has also been found at Usgalimal. Further unifacial choppers were recovered on a flat-based pebble of quartzite from a pebble conglomerate at Shigaon on the Dudhsagar River. Shirodakar made a detailed study of the rock engravings and dated them to Upper Paleolithic and Mesolithic phases, or to 20,000–30,000 BC. These discoveries have demonstrated that the region had been supporting a population of hunter-gatherers well before the advent of agriculture. Evidence of Palaeolithic cave existence can be seen at Dabolim, Adkon, Shigaon, Fatorpa, Arli, Maulinguinim, Diwar, Sanguem, Pilerne, Aquem-Margaon et cetera. Difficulty in carbon dating the laterite rock compounds has posed a problem in determining the exact time period.

==== Kushavati Shamanic culture ====
The prehistoric engravings at Usgalimal were discovered by PP Shirodkar in the early 1990s and subsequently studied by the Institute of Oceanography in Goa. More than 125 forms were found scattered on the banks of river Kushavati in south-eastern Goa. According to Kamat, these are evidence of a prehistoric Goan shamanistic practice. For hundreds of years, the Kushavati rock art of Goa was known locally as goravarakhnyachi chitram, or pictures made by cowherds. But people did not know how ancient the works were, nor could anyone interpret them. After thorough study of these forms, scholars have concluded that these petroglyphs differ from those found elsewhere in Goa. Deeper studies and analysis over a period of ten years showed these petroglyphs were an exquisitely carved ocular labyrinth, one of the best in India and Asia. Its ocular nature added to the evidence of prehistoric shamanism.

The studies have shown that the Kushavati culture was a hunter-gatherer culture with deep knowledge of local natural resources and processes – water, fish, plants, game, animal breeding cycles, seasons and natural calamities. The Kushavati culture was greatly concerned with water security, so they set up camps near the streams. The Kushavati found food security in the jungle near the streams. Like every culture, its members confronted the mysteries of illness, death and birth. Kamat believes that this culture dated to 6,000 to 8,000 years ago. On basis of recent DNA-based work on human migration, Dr. Nandkumar Kamat has ruled out the possibility of Kushavati shamans belonging to the first wave of humans to arrive in Goa. They were not negritoes or austrics. Most probably they were the earliest Mediterraneans who had descended the Western Ghats, probably in their search for sea salt on Goa's coast. As the Kushavati transitioned into a Neolithic society, they began the domestication of animals and were in the last phase of using stone tools. The entire realm of shamanism underwent a radical transition. Today evidence of the metamorphosis in masked dance drama Perni jagor can be seen in the same cultural region.

=== Neolithic period ===
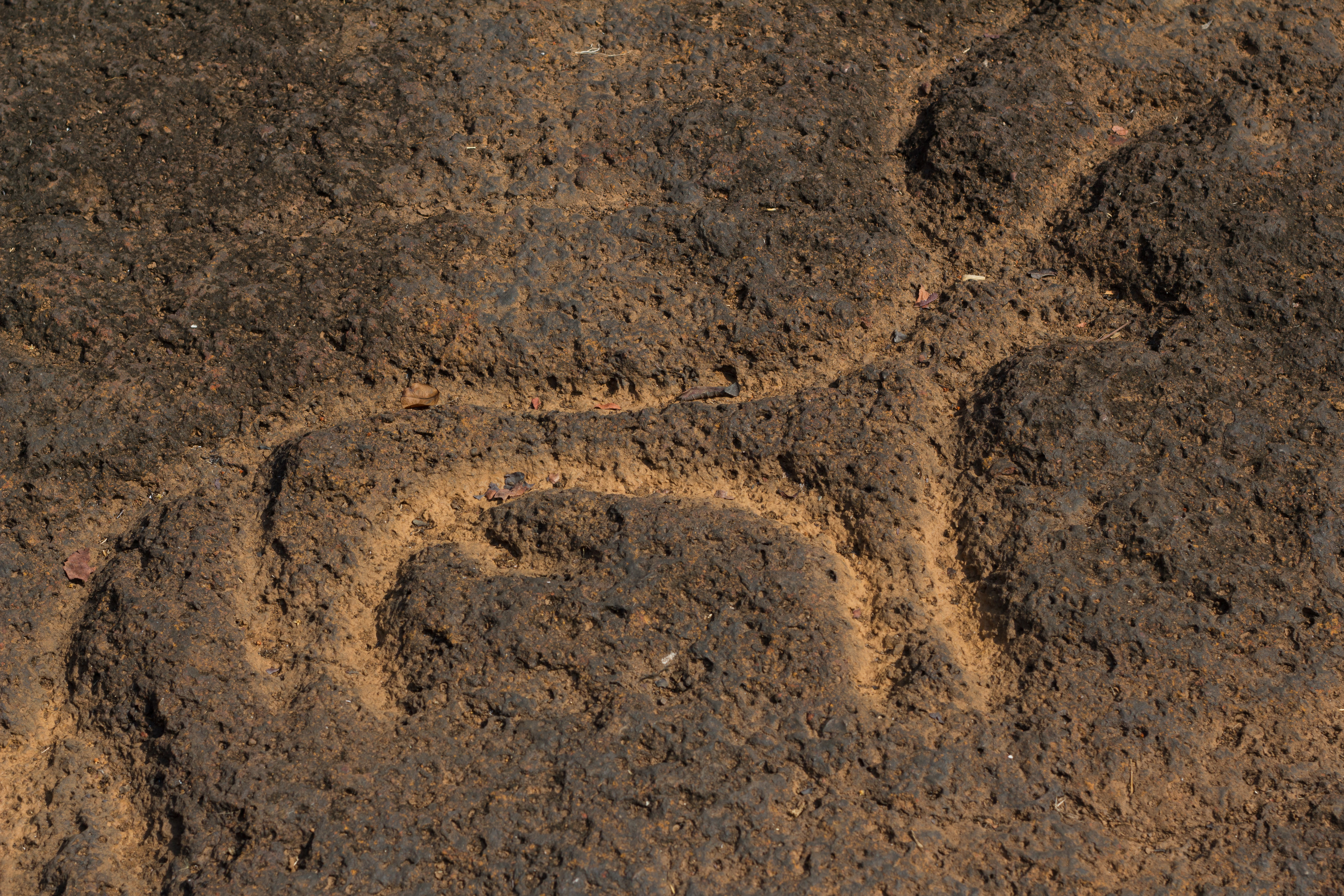
One of the Usgalimal rock engravings, belonging to the Upper Paleolithic or Mesolithic periods. These are some of the earliest traces of human settlement in India.

Archaeological evidence in the form of polished stone axes, suggest the first settlements of Neolithic man in Goa. These axes have been found in Goa Velha. During this period tribes of Austric origin such as the Kols, Mundaris and Kharvis may have settled Goa, living on hunting, fishing and a primitive form of agriculture since 3500 BC. According to Goan historian Anant Ramakrishna Dhume, the Gauda and Kunbi and other such castes are modern descendants of ancient Mundari tribes. Dhume notes several words of Mundari origin in the Konkani language. He describes the deities worshipped by the ancient tribes, their customs, methods of farming, and its overall effect on modern-day Goan culture. The Negroids were in a Neolithic stage of primitive culture and were food-gatherers. Traces of Negroid physical characteristics can be found in parts of Goa, up to at least the middle of the first millennium.

The Proto-Australoid tribe known as the Konkas, from whom is derived the name of the region, Kongvan or Konkan, with the other mentioned tribes, reportedly made up the earliest settlers in the territory. Agriculture had not fully developed at this stage and was being developed. The Kol and Mundari may have been using stone and wood implements, as iron implements were used by the megalithic tribes as late as 1200 BC. The Kol tribe is believed to have migrated from Gujarat.

During this period, the people began worship of a mother goddess in the form of anthill or Santer. The Anthill is called Roen(Konkani:रोयण), which is derived from the Austric word Rono, meaning with holes. The later Indo-Aryan and Dravidian settlers also adopted anthill worship, which was translated into Prakrit Santara. They also worshipped the mother earth by the name of Bhumika in Prakrit. Anthill worship still continues in Goa.

== Iron Age (from 16th century BCE) ==
=== The Formations of Gaumkaris and the self rule ===
The theocratic democracy of Sumer was transformed into the oligarchic democracy of village-administration in Goa known as Gaumkari, when it overlapped with the practices of the locals. The agricultural land was jointly owned by the group of villagers, they had right to auction the land, this rent was used for development, and the remainder was distributed amongst the Gaukars. Sumerians view that the village land must belong to the village god or goddess, this was the main feature of the Gaumkari system where the village's preeminent deity's temple was the centre of all the activities. It consisted of definite boundaries of land from village to village with its topographic detail, its management and social, religious and cultural interaction. Gaumkari thus were in existence long before constitution of the state of Goa itself.

Thus even before any king ruled the territory, oligarchic democracy in the form of Gaumkari existed in Goa. This form of village-administration was called as Gaumponn (Konkani:गांवपण), and despite the periodic change of sovereigns, the Gaumponn always remained, hence the attachment and fidelity of the Goans to their village has always surpassed their loyalty to their rulers (most of them were extraterritorial). This system for governance became further systematised and fortified, and it has continued to exist ever since. Even today 223 comunidades are still functioning in Goa, though not in the true sense.

=== The later migrations ===
The second wave of migrants arrived sometime between 1700 and 1400 BC. This second wave migration was accompanied by southern Indians from the Deccan plateau. A wave of Kusha or Harappan people moved to Lothal probably around 1600 BC to escape submergence of their civilization which thrived on sea-trade. With the admixture of several cultures, customs, religions, dialects and beliefs, led to revolutionary change in early Goan society.

=== Maurya Empire ===
Chandragupta Maurya incorporated the west coast of India in his province of Aparanta, and the impact of Magadhan Prakrit, the official language of the Mauryan Empire, on the local dialects resulted in the formation of early Konkani, as was the case with other Aryan vernaculars. During this era Buddhism was introduced to Goa. Similarly a native Goan named Purna, also known as Punna in Pali, who traveled to Sarnath is considered a direct disciple of Buddha, who popularised Buddhism in Goa in the 5th century BC.

=== The Satavahanas (c. 2nd century BCE to 2nd CE) ===
The Satavahana dynasty ruled Goa through their coastal vassals, the Chutus of Karwar. This period is estimated to have lasted from around the 2nd century BC to 100 AD. The Satavahanas had established maritime power and their contacts with Roman Empire from the coastal trade from Sindh to Saurashtra, from Bharuch to Sopara to Goa, where Greek and Roman ships would halt during voyages. The Bhojas fortified themselves after the end of Satavahana Empire. With the fall of the Satavahanas, the lucrative seaborne trade declined. Many Greek converts to Buddhism settled in Goa during this period. Buddha statues in Greek styles have been found in Goa. It can be seen that they ruled a very small part of Goa. Maharashtri prakrit was their language of administration, which influenced medieval Konkani to a great extent.

Goa under the Western Kshatrapas

In the year 150AD, Vashishtiputra Satakarni was defeated by his son-in-law, the Kshatrapa King Rudradaman I who established his rule over Goa. This dynasty ruled the territory until 249AD. Thereafter the dynasty's power seems to have been weakened by their generals, the Abhiras

=== The Mauryas of Puri ===
The history of the Mauryas is almost non-existent. The existing records disclose the names of only three of the dynasty's kings, namely Suketavarman, who ruled some time in the 4th or 5th centuries, Chandravarman in the 6th century, and Ajitavarman in the 7th century, who ruled from Kumardvipa or modern Kumarjuve, but beyond that the records provide no clue as to their mutual relationship. These dates were determined by comparing the style of the Nagari script in which these records are written with the evolution of this script, which may be dated fairly accurately. It is possible to infer from the places mentioned in these records and their discovery locations that at its zenith, the Western Maurya Kingdom comprised the Lata or South Gujarat, coastal Maharashtra, Goa, and approximately half of the North Kanara district. After the Maurya Empire had passed its meridian in the 2nd century BC its satrap in Aparanta made himself independent. A scion of the imperial Mauryas, he founded a dynasty that ruled over the west coast for nearly four centuries from its capital Shurparaka or modern Sopara. This dynasty was known as the Konkan Mauryas. Goa was called Sunaparant by the Mauryas.

=== Bhojas (c. 2nd century BCE to 4th CE) ===
First existing as vassals of the Mauryas and later as an independent kingdom, the Bhojas ruled Goa for more than 500 years, annexing the entirety of Goa. The earliest known record of the Bhojas from Goa dates from the 4th century, it was found in the town of Shiroda in Goa. According to Puranik, by tradition the Bhojas belonged to the clan of Yadavas, who may have migrated to Goa via Dwaraka after the Mahabharata War. Two Bhoja copperplates grants dating back to the 3rd century BC were unearthed from Bandora village, written by King Prithvimallavarman. Ancient Chandrapur, modern day Chandor, was the capital of the Bhoja Empire.

From the Bhoja inscriptions found in Goa and Konkan, it is evidenced that the Bhojas used Sanskrit and Prakrit for administration. According to Vithal Raghavendra Mitragotri, many Brahmins and Vaishyas arrived with Kshatriyas Bhojas from the north. The Kshatriya Bhojas patronised Buddhism and employed many Buddhist converts of Greek and Persian origin.

== Kingdoms to Late Medieval period (1st century CE to 16th) ==
=== Table of dynasties (to 16th century) ===
Goa was ruled by several dynasties of various origins from circa the beginning of the common era to 1500. Since Goa had been under the sway of several dynasties, there was no organised judicial or policing system in those days, except for traditional arrangements governed by absolute rulers and local chieftains. There may have been more order under Muslim rule. During this time, Goa was not ruled as a singular kingdom. Parts of this territory were ruled by several different kingdoms. The boundaries of these kingdoms were not clearly defined and the kings were content to consider their dominions as extending over many villages, which paid tribute and owed them allegiance.

Dynasties controlling Goa from the 1st century BC to 1500 AD
| Name of the ruler | Reign |
|---|---|
| Indo-Parthians | 2nd–4th centuries AD |
| Abhiras, Batapuras, Bhojas | 4th–6th centuries |
| Chalukyas of Badami | 6th–8th centuries |
| Rashtrakutas of Malkhed, Shilaharas | 8th–10th centuries |
| Kadambas | 1006–1356 |
| Yadavas of Devagiri | 12th and 13th centuries |
| Vijayanagara Empire | 14th and 15th centuries |
| Bahmani Sultanate | 15th century |

=== Shilaharas (755 – 1000) ===
The Shilaharas of South Konkan ruled Goa from 755 until 1000 AD. Sannaphulla, the founder of the dynasty, was a vassal of the Rashtrakutas. Their copper-plate inscriptions suggest that they ruled from Vallipattana (there is no unanimity amongst the scholars regarding identification of Vallipattana, some identify it with Balli in Goa, or it may either be Banda or Kharepatan in the modern-day state of Maharashtra), Chandrapura and Gopakapattana. This was a tumultuous period in Goan history. As the Goa Shilahara power waned during the 11th century, the Arab traders gained increasing control of the overseas trade. They enjoyed autonomy from the Shilaharas. In order to control this decline, Kadamba King Guhalladeva I, ruling from Chandor, established secular, political, and economic partnerships with these Arab states. After the Chalukyas defeated the Rashtrakutas, exploiting this situation to their advantage, the Kadamba King, Shashthadeva II, firmly established his rule in Goa.

=== Kadambas (10th century to 14th) ===
The Kadambas ruled Goa between the 10th and 14th centuries. In the beginning, the Kadambas ruled only Sashti present day Salcette, a small part of Konkan. They ruled from Chandor, over a large part of Goa, but the port of Gopakapattana was not included in the early years.

==== Port of Gopakapattana (10th century to 1345) ====
Later King Shashthadeva conquered the island of Goa, including the ports of Gopakapattana and Kapardikadvipa, and annexed a large part of South Konkan to his kingdom. He made Gopakapattana as his secondary capital. His successor, King Jayakeshi I, expanded the Goan kingdom. The Sanskrit Jain text Dvayashraya mentions the extent of his capital. Port Gopakapattana had trade contacts with Zanzibar, Bengal, Gujarat and Sri Lanka (mentioned as Zaguva, Gauda, Gurjara, and Simhala in the Sanskrit texts). The city has been described in the contemporary records not only as aesthetically pleasing, but spiritually cleansing as well. Because it was a trading city, Gopakapattana was influenced by many cultures, and its architecture and decorative works showed this cosmopolitan effect. The capital was served by an important highway called Rajvithi or Rajpath, which linked it with Ela, the ruins of which can still be seen. For more than 300 years, it remained a centre for intra-coastal and trans-oceanic trade from Africa to Malaya. Later in the 14th century, the port was looted by the Khalji general Malik Kafur. The capital was transferred to Chandor and then back to Gopakapattana because of Muhammad bin Tughluq's attack on Chandor.

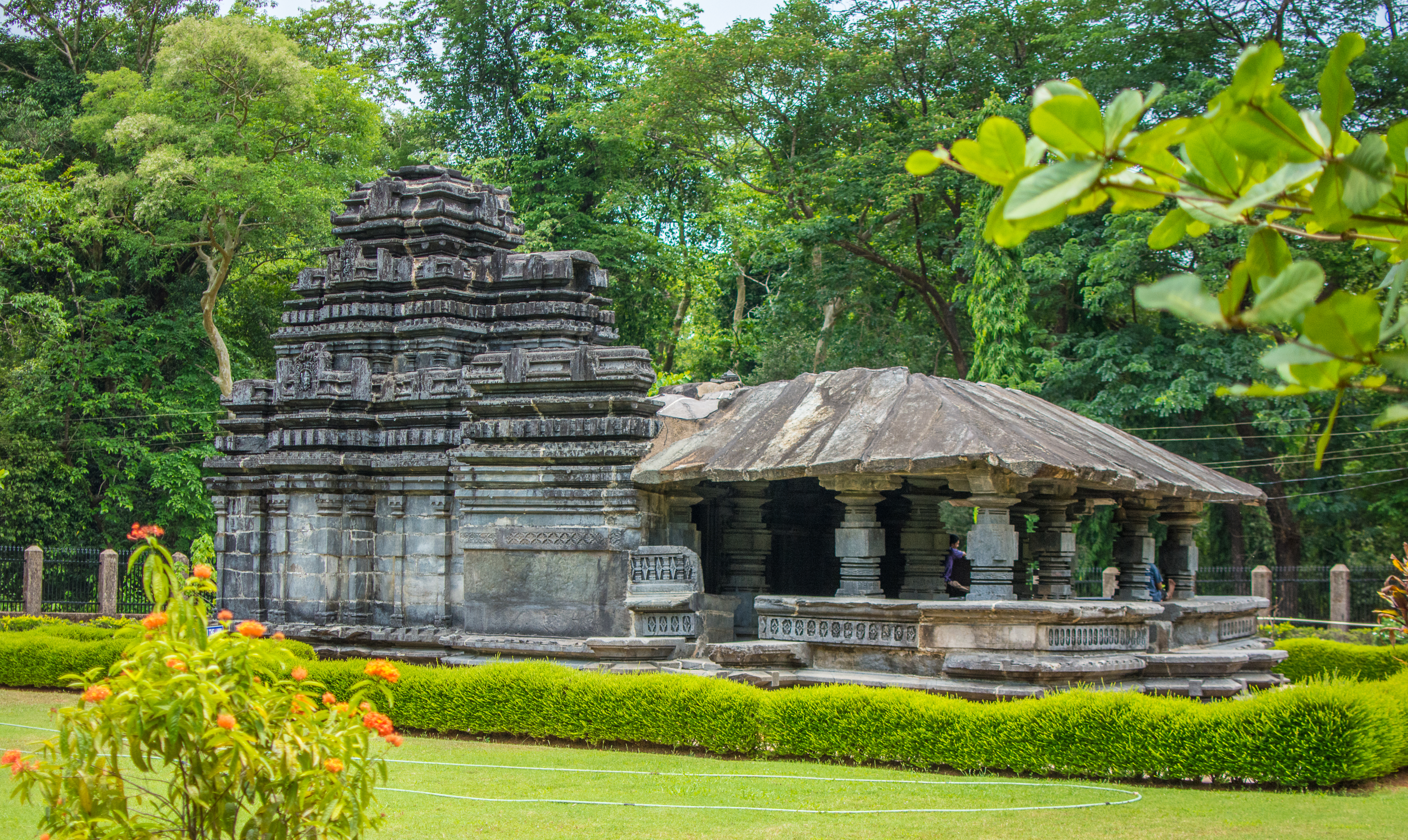
The Mahadeva Temple at Tambdi Surla, built during the 12th century CE is one of the few surviving medieval temples in Goa.

Guhalladeva III, Jayakeshi II, Shivachitta Paramadideva, Vinshuchitta II and Jayakeshi III dominated Goa's political scene in the 12th century. During the rule of Kadambas, the name and fame of Goapuri had reached it zenith. Goa's religion, culture, trade and arts flourished under the rule of these kings. The Kings and their queens built many Shiva temples as they were devout Shaivites. They assumed titles like Konkanadhipati, Saptakotisha Ladbha Varaveera, Gopakapura varadhishva, Konkanmahacharavarti and Panchamahashabda. The Kings had matrimonial relationships with the Kings of Saurashtra, and even the local chieftains. The Kings patronised Vedic religion and performed major fire sacrifices like the horse sacrifice or Ashvamedha. They are also known for patronising Jainism in Goa.

Though their language of administration was Sanskrit and Kannada, Konkani and Marathi were also prevalent. They introduced the Kannada language to Goa, which had a very profound influence on the local tongue. Nagari script, Kadamba script, Halekannada script and Goykanadi scripts were very popular. Kadamba Tribhuvanamalla, inscribed a record, dated saka 1028 or AD 1106, that he established a Brahmapuri at Gopaka. Brahmapuris were ancient universities run by the Brahmins where the Vedas, astrology, philosophy, medicine, and other subjects were studied. Such Brahampuris were found in many places in Goa such as Savoi verem and Gauli moula.

The Kadambas ruled Goa for more than 400 years. On 16 October 1345 Goa Kadamba King Suriya Deva was assassinated by Muslim invaders.

=== Bahmani Sultanate (1350–1370, 1469–1492) ===
From 1350 to 1370, Goa was ruled by the Bahmani Sultanate. In 1469 Goa was again conquered by the Bahmani Sultans of Gulbarga. This Sultanate broke up in 1492.

=== Vijayanagara Empire (14th century to 15th) ===
In 1370, the Vijayanagara Empire reconquered Goa. Vijayanagara was a resurgent Hindu state controlling much of south India; its capital was located at modern day Hampi, in Karnataka. The Vijayanagara rulers then held Goa for nearly a century. During that time its harbours were important ports of arrival for Arabian horses destined for the Vijayanagara cavalry.

=== Bijapur Sultanate (1492–1510) ===
In 1492, Goa became a part of Adil Shah's Bijapur Sultanate, which established Goa Velha as its second capital. The former Secretariat building in Panaji is a former Adil Shahi palace. It functioned for the Portuguese as the official residence of their Viceroys.

== Portuguese rule (1510–1961) ==
=== Portuguese arrival ===
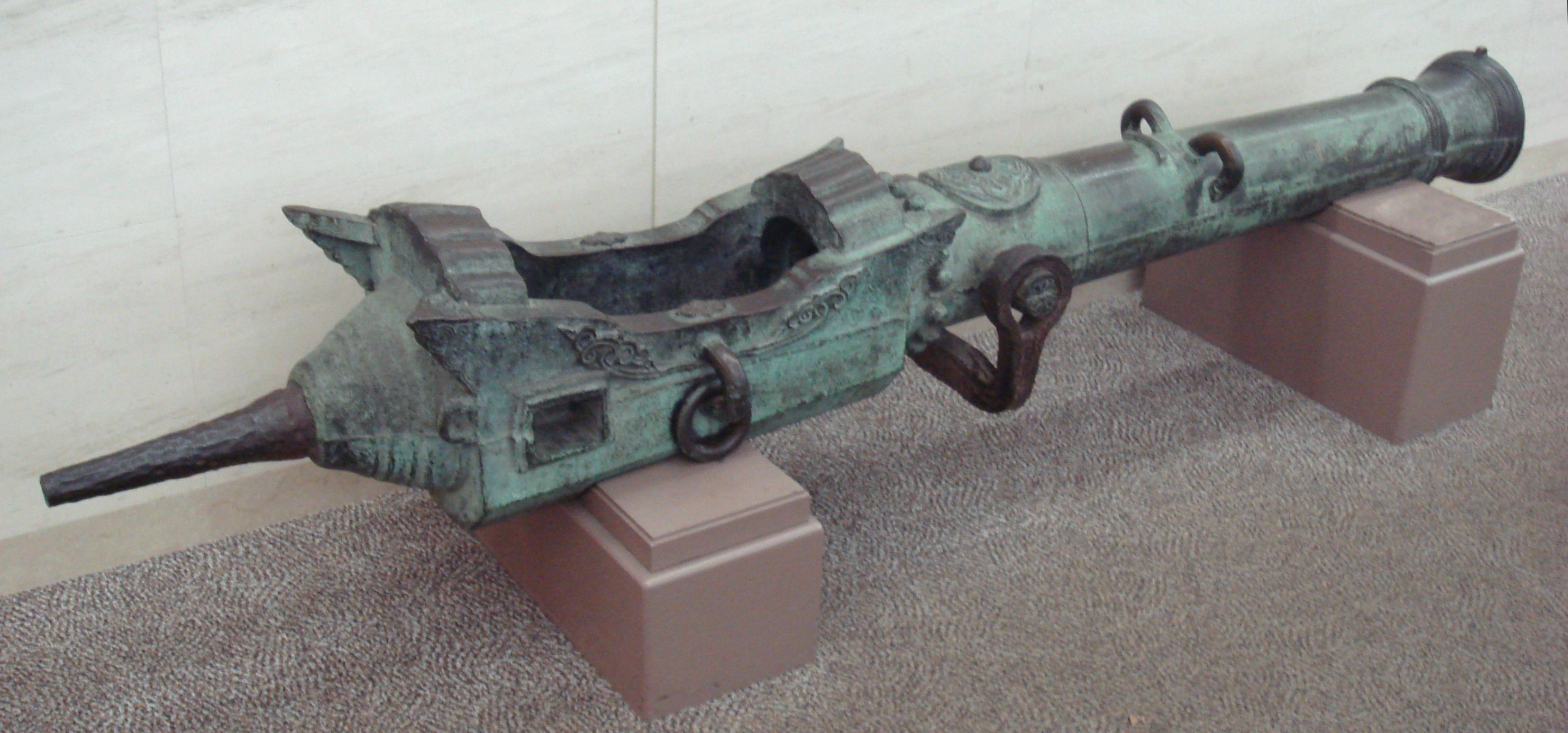
A breech-loading swivel gun thought to have been constructed in the 16th century in Goa. It was exported to Japan and used in the time of Oda Nobunaga.

Vasco da Gama commanded the first circumnavigation of Africa, relying on stories and maps from earlier Portuguese voyages. His fleet of four ships set off from Lisbon in 1497. After island stops at Tenerife and Cape Verde, the ships made landfall on the West African coast. They then steered southwest into the vast South Atlantic Ocean. Near Brazil, by making an eastward turn, they headed toward the southern cape of Africa which they rounded. After passing by the Rio do Infante described earlier by a fellow explorer, a northward course was set. The ships stopped at the East African ports of Mozambique, Mombasa and Malinda. An Arab pilot, or an Indian, then guided their remaining course across the Arabian Sea. A year out from Lisbon, da Gama's fleet landed in Calicut, India. Their arrival signalled the end of Muslim monopoly over the region's maritime trade.

Before the Portuguese ships came to India, the seas to the east had been dominated by the thalassocratic Chola Empire of the Tamils, followed by their Shailendra dynasty successors and other Indianized seafaring states of Java and Sumatra. "Indian ship-building had a high reputation at the time". Yet "by the fifteenth century the navigation of Indian waters was in the hands of the Arabs" both toward the east and westward toward the Gulf and the Red Sea.

=== Afonso de Albuquerque ===
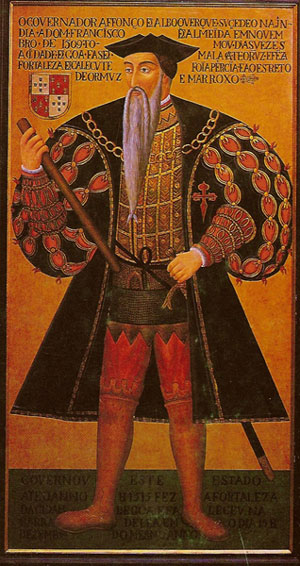
The governor of India Afonso de Albuquerque.

When Francisco de Almeida arrived to serve as the first Portuguese viceroy of the East (1505-1509), already there was a regional war on the Malabar coast. In 1505 the Estado da India was established there, in Cochin considerably south of Goa. Almeida ended his tenure with a naval victory fought off Diu, far to the north in Gujarat.

The admiral Afonso de Albuquerque became second viceroy (1509-1515). In 1510 Timoji requested the Portuguese to take over Goa. The offer was welcomed. The city then was quickly seized from Ismail Adil Shah, ruler of the Bijapur Sultanate, but as quickly lost. Albuquerque, however, returned in force on 25 November. In a day the gunnery of the Portuguese ships, and armed parties landing on shore, regained possession. Ismail Adil Shah and his Egyptian Mamluk allies formally surrendered Goa on 10 December. An estimate held that 6,000 of the 9,000 Muslim defenders died, in the battle on the streets or trying to flee. Albuquerque gained direct support from the Hindu people, which frustrated Timoji. He had expected to take autocratic command of the city. Albuquerque appointed him instead chief Aguazil, an administrative office whose role included being the Hindu representative. Timoji was a learned interpreter of local customs.

By eliminating the jizya tax, Albuquerque secured his victory. "Most of the population of Goa were Konkani-speaking Hindus [and] Albuquerque had the good sense to cut their taxes in half". In spite of frequent attacks by raiders, Goa became the centre of Portuguese India. The conquest drew deference from several neighboring kingdoms: the Sultan of Gujarat and the Zamorin of Calicut dispatched embassies, offering alliances and local concessions, e.g., to build fortifications.

Albuquerque started a Portuguese mint in Goa. Local merchants and Timoji had complained about the scarcity of currency. The new coin served to announce the recent conquests. Its value was pegged to existing coins. An additional mint was built in Portuguese Malacca.

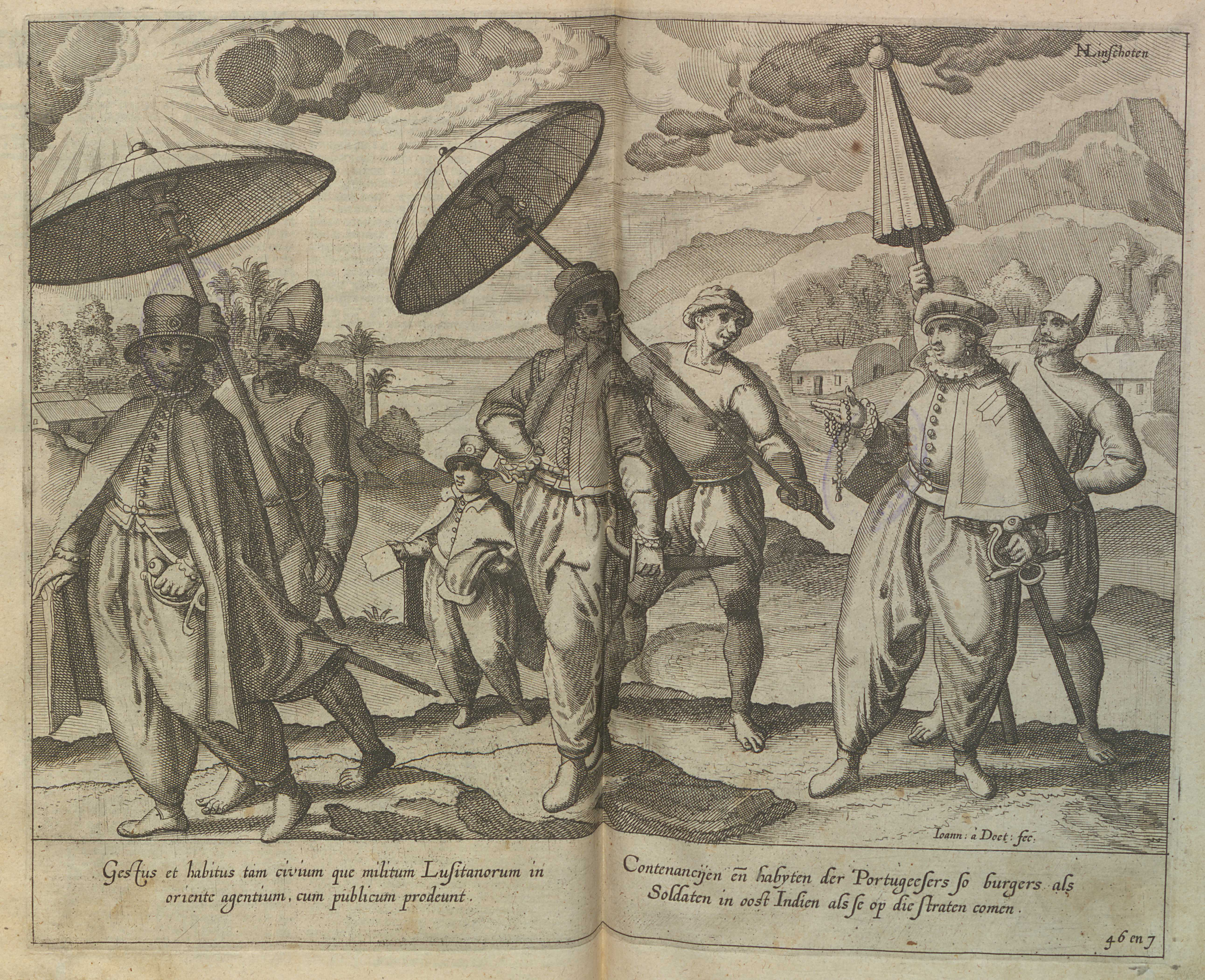
The Portuguese in Asia, in Itinerario, by Jan Huygen van Linschoten.

Albuquerque and his successors left the customs and constitutions of the thirty village communities on the island almost untouched, abolishing only the rite of sati, in which widows were burned on their husband's funeral pyre. A register of these customs (Foral de usos e costumes) was published in 1526; it is among the most valuable historical documents pertaining to Goan customs.

Goa was the base for Albuquerque's conquest of Malacca in 1511 and Hormuz in 1515. Albuquerque intended it to be a colony and a naval base, distinct from the fortified factories established in certain Indian seaports. Goa was made capital of the Portuguese Vice-Kingdom in Asia, and the other Portuguese possessions in India, Malacca and other bases in Indonesia, East Timor, the Persian Gulf, Macau in China and trade bases in Japan were under the suzerainty of its Viceroy. By mid-16th century, the area under occupation had expanded to most of present-day limits.

=== The new Goan polity ===
==== Civil government and jurisdiction ====
An initial aim of the rulers of Goa was military security, especially from the threat posed by the Bijapur sultanate. Goa's head of state, often titled the Viceroy, was appointed directly by the Portuguese King. The viceroy might consult the finance council, the captain of the armed forces, the fidalgos, the Archbishop of Goa, the chief of judiciary, the Vereador da Fazenda (superintendent of finance), the merchants, and others in informal councils. Commercial success was a primary objective, the purchase in quantity of fine spices to carry back to Europe. Ancillary objectives were creation of a spice-trade monopoly with control over merchant competitors, and levying duties on the cargoes of merchant vessels. Scores of commercial posts and stations were established, not only throughout India, but from Mozambique (Africa) and Hormuz (the Gulf) to Malacca (Malaya) and Macau (China).

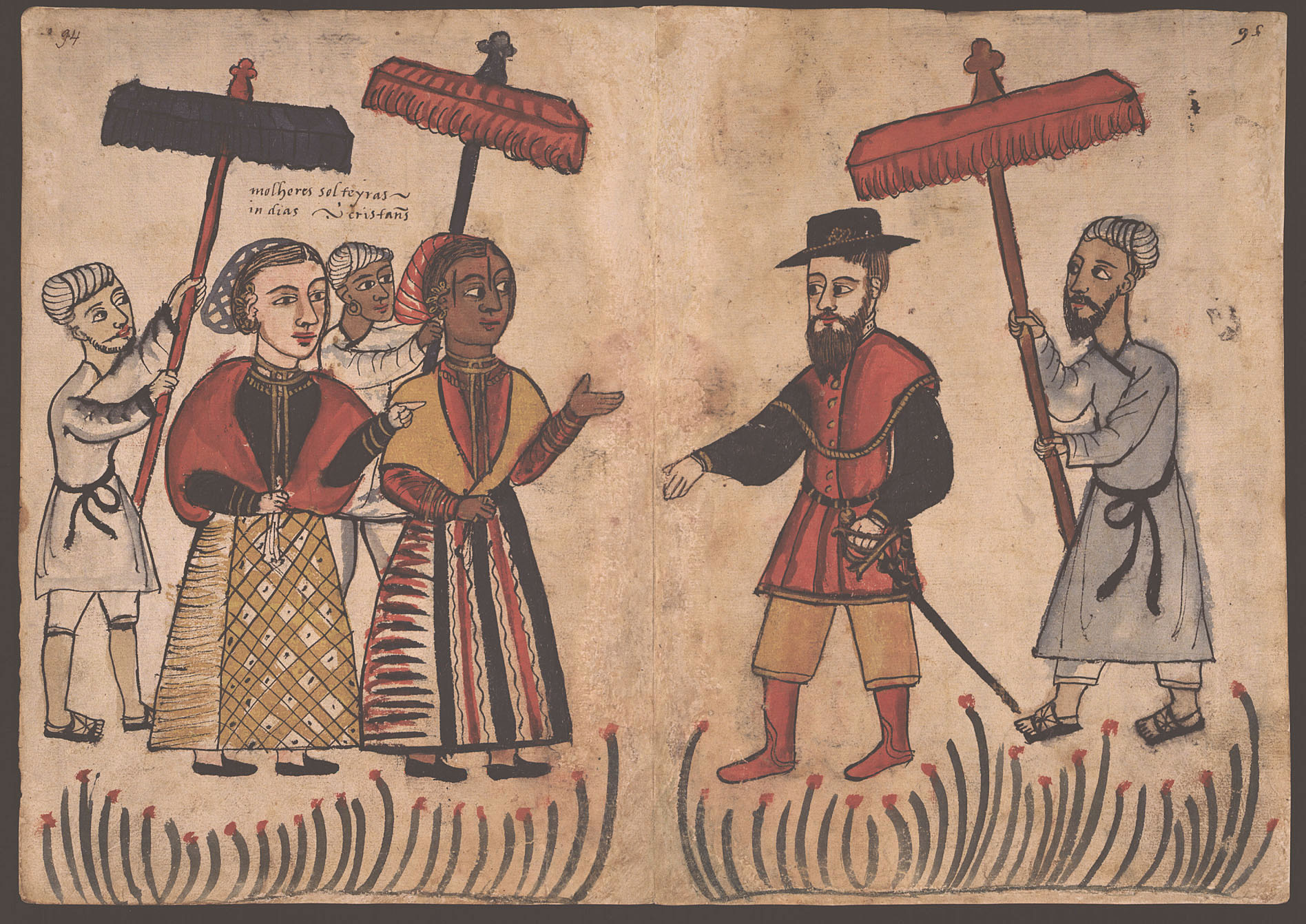
Christian maidens of Goa meeting a Portuguese nobleman seeking a wife, circa 1540

Portuguese rule in Goa endured for four and a half centuries. Its Senate or municipal chamber maintained direct communications with the King and paid a special representative to attend to its interests at Court. In 1563 the Governor proposed to make Goa the seat of a parliament representing all parts of the Portuguese east, but this was rejected by the King. Eventually Goa was granted the same civic privileges as Lisbon.

The Portuguese rulers in Goa were either Viceroys or Governors. Their original jurisdiction included those possessions of the Portuguese from east Africa to south Asia and east Asia. The first viceroy to serve located himself in Kochi to the south of Goa on the Malabar coast; in 1510 this Portuguese seat of government was then established at Velha Goa.

==== Control of navigation ====
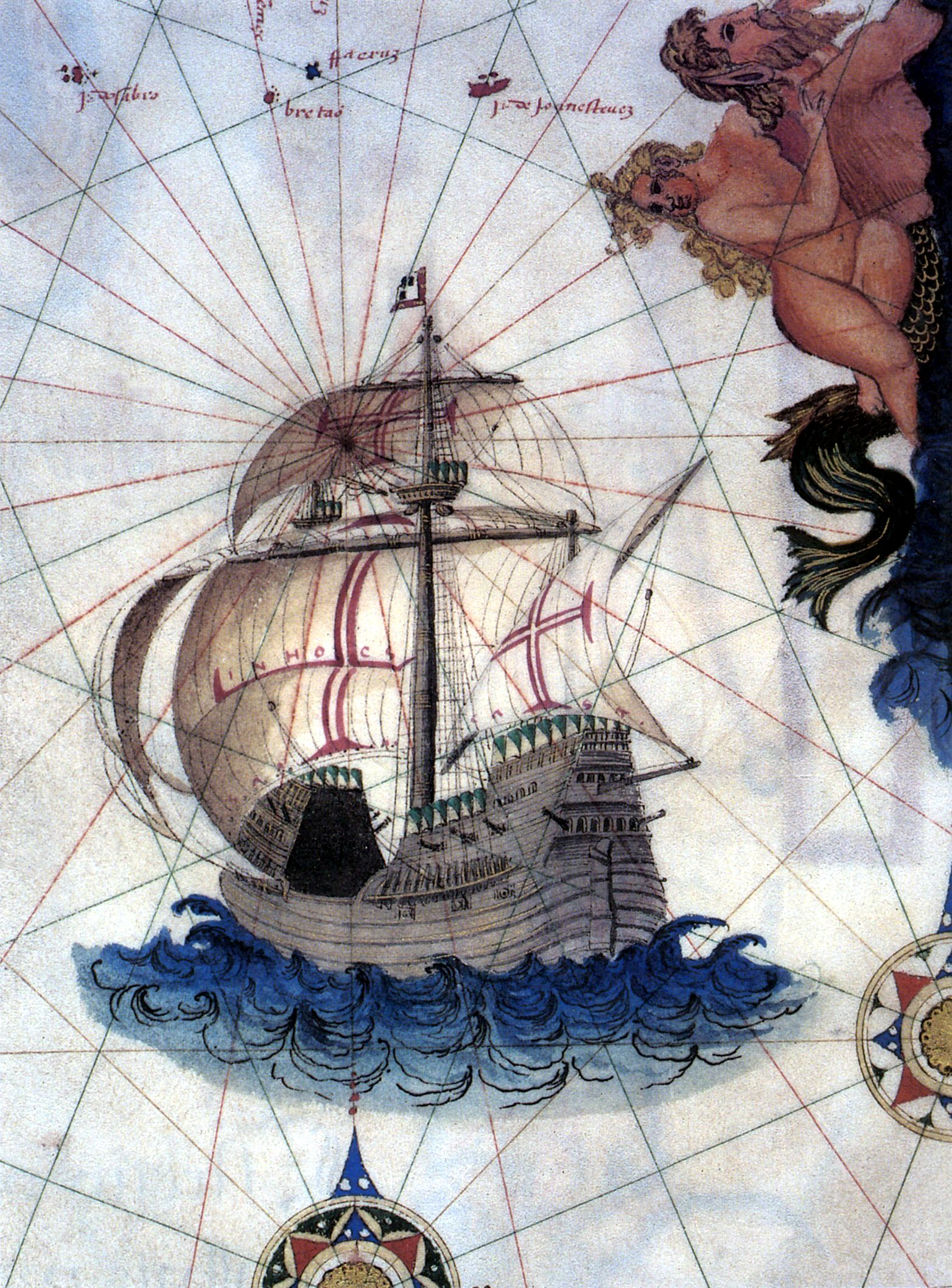
1565 illustration of a Portuguese carrack.

Chief among the rivals of Portuguese Goa were the traders of the Zamorin, ruler of Calicut (Kozhikode) on the Malabar coast (northern Kerala). The Zamorin's merchant ships regularly sailed on the Arabian Sea, also venturing in the Bay of Bengal. Other formidable sea traders were of Gujarat to the north. Opponents of the Portuguese in India could then effectively convert their merchant vessels into warships. Early naval battles were Chaul (1508), and a decisive one off Diu (1509) won by the Portuguese.

Naval combat worked to decide the status of the rivals. The distinct advantage of the Portuguese was the cannon mounted on their ships. Vasco de Gama's flagship San Gabriel alone carried twenty guns of quality manufacture. Their mostly Muslim antagonists, lacking ship cannon, could not compete in the sea battles. Although Babur's invasion of India in 1526 used cannon, their use "on ships at sea was not known" before the Portuguese. Further, the well-made sailing ships of India had hulls sewn together not nailed, better in some weather, but unable to absorb the recoil from discharge of onboard cannon. "India was, on most criteria, one of the advanced countries of the world." Yet regarding naval cannon, gunnery, ship design, and nautical skill, the Portuguese had the edge.

The Ottoman Turks also disputed control of the Indian Ocean. At Suez overland by camel they transported Mediterranean galleys in pieces for reassembly on the Red Sea, to reinforce their naval forces. From 1538 to 1553 the Turks sent battle fleets against the Portuguese. In several key engagements, however, the transoceanic caravels and galleons outmaneuvered the Turkish galleys.

Hence, from Goa the Portuguese were able to command the Indian Ocean. They instituted a system to tax its trade. Portuguese cartazes (permits for navigation) were issued to owners of merchant vessels. The cartaza obliged the captain to keep to his ship's declared route and stop at the named Portuguese fort to pay duties on merchandise. "Any ship sailing without their cartas was treated as a pirate and was liable to capture and confiscation. . . . The Arab sea trade with India... passed into the hands of the Portuguese." During the sixteenth century "some eight hundred Portuguese galleons" sailed in Indian waters, which became "virtually a Portuguese monopoly."

==== Spice trade ====
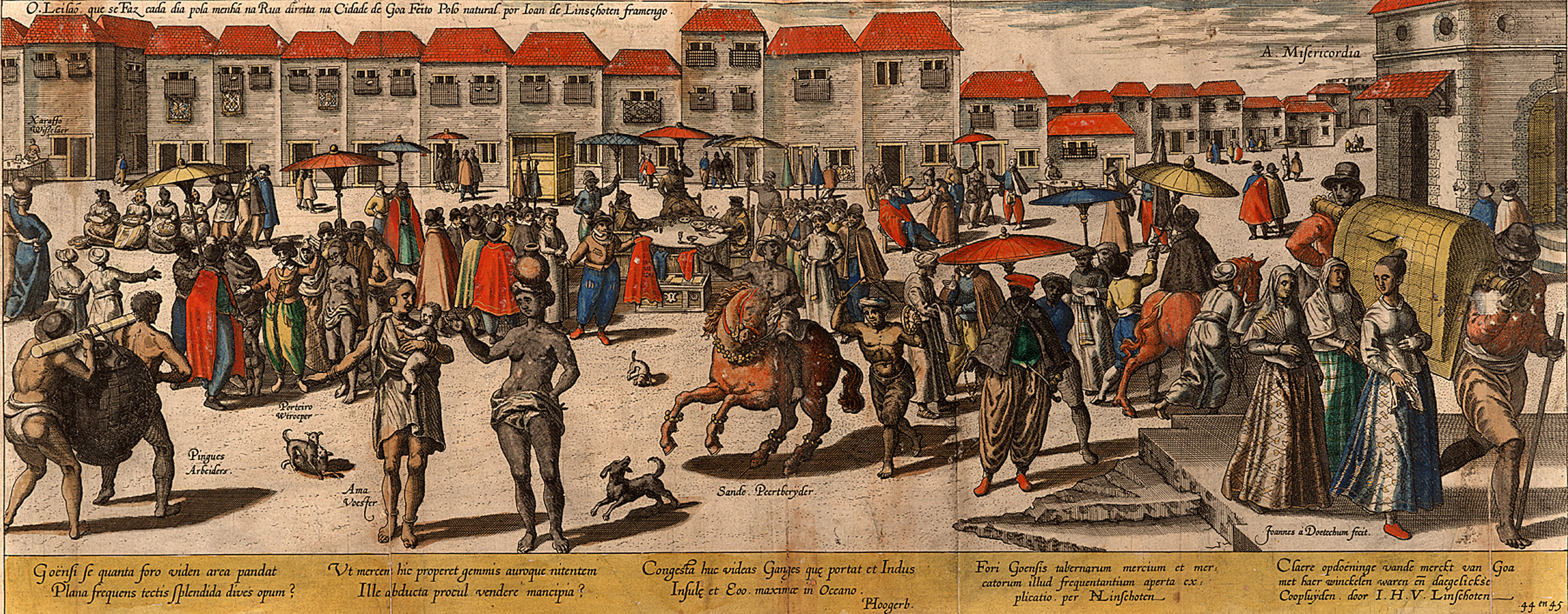
Johannes van Doetecum's "Market of Goa", from Jan Huygen's 1596 Itinerario

Portuguese control of the waters off South Asia enabled them to master the lucrative spice trade during the 16th century. They coordinated and consolidated their operations from their base at Goa. At first their merchants, called factors, were unfamiliar with the local produce markets, and with appraising the quality of different spices. They learned how not to overpay for poor quality. For storage until seasonal ships left for Portugal, they set up warehouses called factories. At strategic positions on many coasts of the Indian Ocean, the Portuguese established well-guarded, fortified factories.

At the bazaars of Goa, goods from all parts of the East were displayed. Separate streets were designated for the sale of different classes of goods: Bahrain pearls and coral, Chinese porcelain and silk, Portuguese velvet and piece-goods, and drugs and spices from the Malay Archipelago. Fine peppers came from the nearby Malabar coast. Goa was then called Goa Dourada, i.e., Golden Goa.

Especially the Portuguese enjoyed the great rewards to be made by shipping spice cargoes around Africa to Lisbon. The ever increasing demand of Europe meant ready buyers willing to pay top prices. "Arab and Venetian merchants remained in the spice trade throughout the century of Portuguese power in Asia" but the "trade has shifted dramatically". The middle-merchant carriers had been short-circuited by the ships direct to Lisbon.

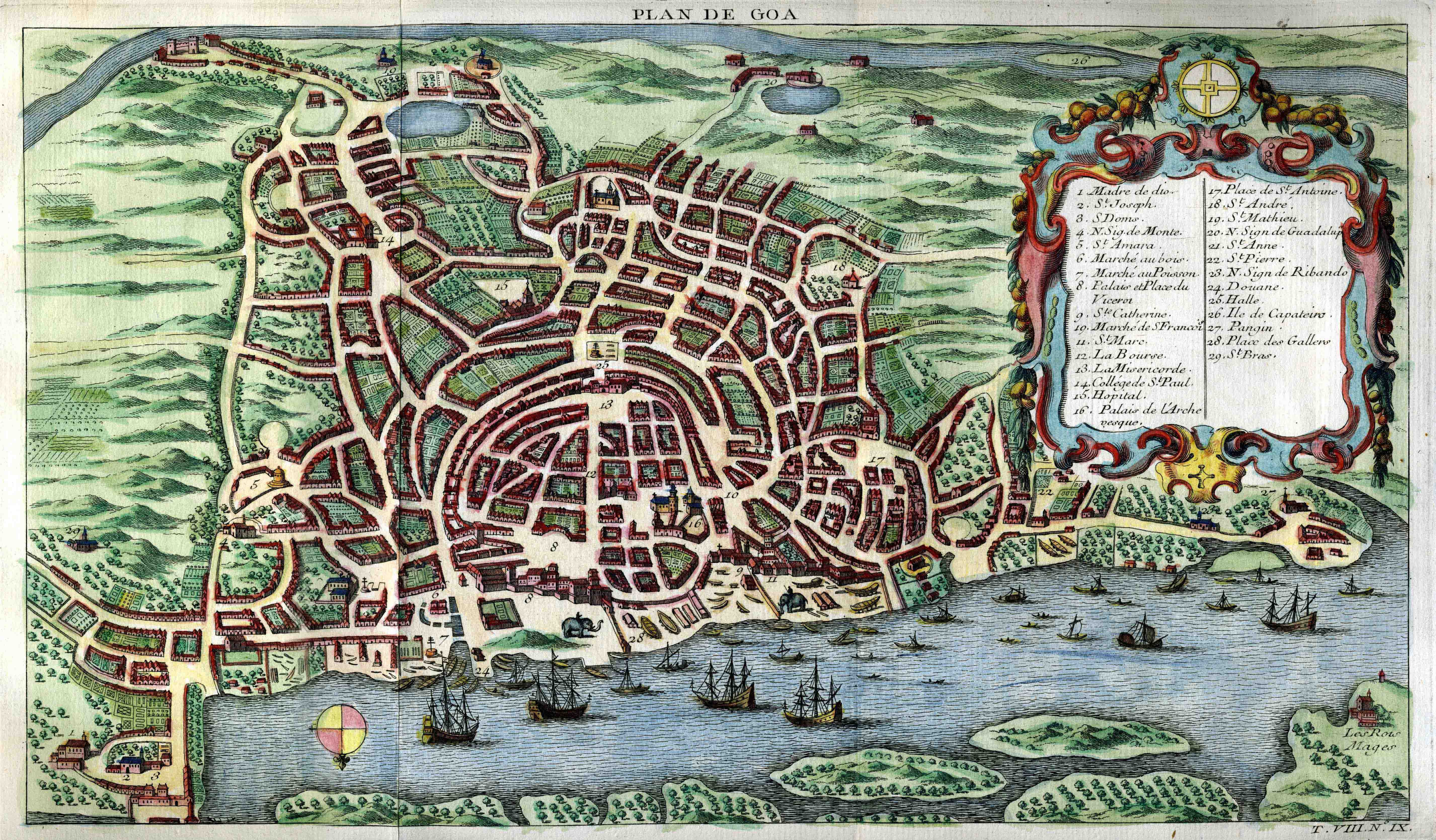
Map of Goa, in Histoire générale des Voyages, de la Harpe, 1750.

==== Life in Goa ====
In 1542, St. Francis Xavier mentions the architectural splendour of the city. Goa reached the height of its prosperity between 1575 and 1625. Travellers marvelled at Goa Dourada, i.e., Golden Goa. A Portuguese proverb said, "He who has seen Goa need not see Lisbon." The houses of the rich were surrounded by gardens and palm groves; they were built of stone and painted red or white. Instead of glass, their balconied windows had thin polished oyster-shells set in lattice-work. The social life of Goa's rulers befitted the capital of the viceregal court, the army and navy, and the church; luxury and ostentation became a byword before the end of the 16th century. Nonetheless, according to Portuguese records there was a Cholera epidemic in 1543, "It is said that deaths from the disposal of the disease were so numerous that the disposal of bodies was a formidable task"

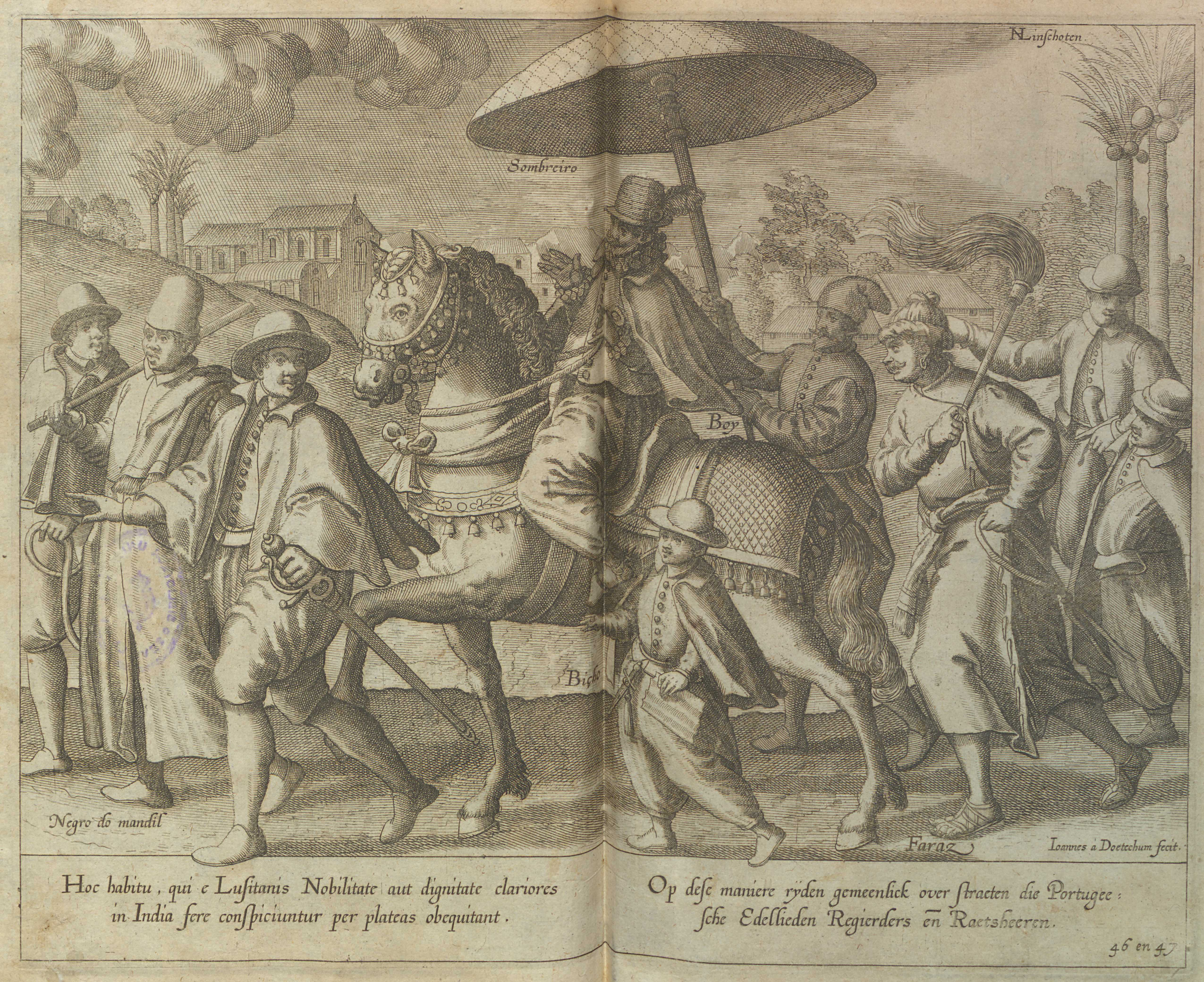
Portuguese nobleman in Goa accompanied by a retinue.

In the main street, African and Indian slaves were sold by auction. Almost all manual labour was performed by slaves. The common soldiers assumed high-sounding titles, and even the poor noblemen who congregated in boarding-houses subscribed for a few silken cloaks, a silken umbrella and a common man-servant, so that each could take his turn to promenade the streets, fashionably attired and with a proper escort.

In 1583, Christian missionary activity in the village of Cuncolim led to conflicts, culminating in the Cuncolim Revolt. The first massacre happened when kshatriya villagers killed five Catholic priests (including an Italian nobleman) and fourteen native Christians. The Portuguese authorities then destroyed orchards and attacked the Hindu villagers. Cuncolim village had sixteen chieftains, one for each ward or vado of the village. The sixteen were called to Assolna Fort, ostensibly to discuss a peace pact. At the fort the Portuguese executed the chieftains, except for one who jumped into the Assolna River and presumably swam to Karwar. The Hindus of Cuncolim then refused to pay taxes, and the Portuguese confiscated their land. In 1560 the Goa Inquisition began, ending in 1812. The Hindu villagers who did not want to become Christian then left their villages with their idols before their temples were demolished. Most of these Hindus then settled in the neighbouring areas that were ruled by Bijapur, and again had to pay the jizya tax.

==== Printing press and medical college ====
In 1556 a printing press was first installed India at Saint Paul's College in Goa. Through publications made on the printing press, Goa opened a window on the knowledge and customs of Europe. The Jesuits brought this European-style, metal movable type technology to Macau in China in 1588 and to Japan in 1590. The Jesuits also founded the University of Santo Tomas in the Philippines, the oldest existing European-style university in the Far East. In the same period, Goa Medical College was established as the first European medical college in Asia.

Garcia da Orta (1501-1568) wrote in Goa a treatise in Portuguese on the medicinal plants of India, Colóquios dos simples e drogas da India. It was published in 1563 in Goa on the new printing press, which contained many errors in its type-setting. The author was a physician, an herbalist, a pioneer in pharmacognosy, and originally a Sephardic Jew. As a Cristão Novo (New Christian) he had escaped the Inquisition; but one of his sisters was not as fortunate.

=== Christianity in Goa ===
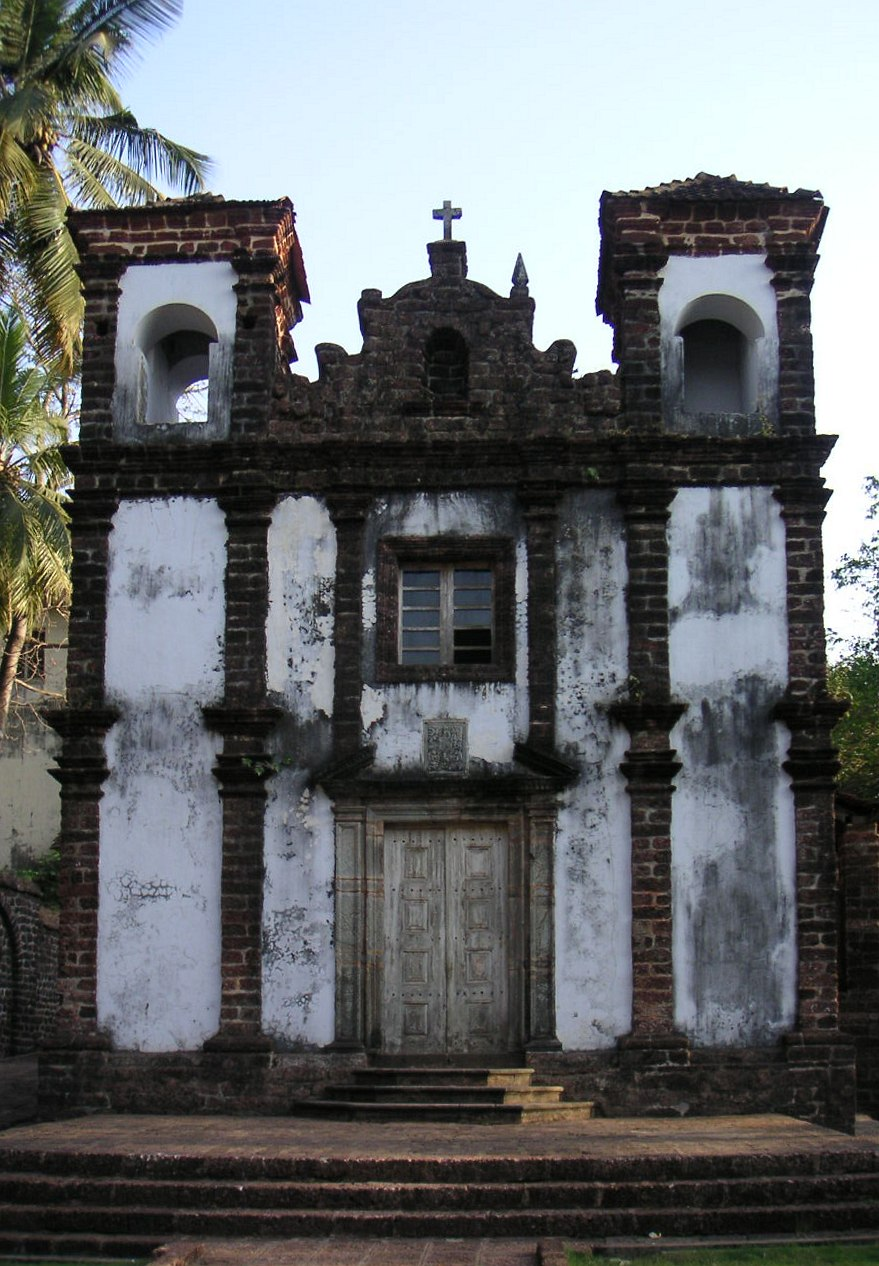
Chapel of St. Catherine, built during the Portuguese occupation in Old Goa. (Note: Not to be confused with the Cathedral of Santa Catarina, also in Old Goa.)

The Crown in Lisbon undertook to finance missionary activity; missionaries and priests converted large numbers of people in all spheres of society, especially in Goa. St Francis Xavier in Goa, pioneered the establishment of a seminary, called Saint Paul's College. It was the first Jesuit headquarters in Asia. St Francis founded the college to train Jesuit missionaries. He went to the Far East, traveling towards China. Missionaries of the Jesuit Order spread out through India, going as far north as the court of the great Mughal Emperor Jallaluddin Akbar. Having heard about the Jesuits, he invited them to come and teach him and his children about Christianity.

From Goa, the Jesuit order was able to set up base almost anywhere in Asia for evangelistic missions, including the founding of Roman Catholic colleges, universities and faculties of education. Jesuits are known for their work in education, intellectual research, and cultural pursuits, and for their missionary efforts. Jesuits also give retreats, minister in hospitals and parishes, and promote social justice and ecumenical dialogue.; Saint Paul's College Goa was a base for their evangelisation of Macau, and then for their important missionary campaigns into China and Japan. Macau eventually superseded St Paul's College, Goa. They built St Paul College in 1594 (now the University of Macau), known in Latin as the college of Mater Dei. Due to his personal enmity with the Jesuits, the Marquês de Pombal expelled the order from Portuguese territories in 1762. The Macau university combined evangelisation with education.

In the year 1600 António de Andrade made the long voyage from Lisbon to Goa, where he pursued his higher studies at St. Paul's College and was ordained a Jesuit priest. He eventually became rector of the same college. He made a landmark missionary expedition from Goa, across the length of India and into Tibet. He overcame incredible hardships in the journey as the first European to cross the Himalaya mountains into Tibet. There he founded churches and a mission in 1625. The body of the co-founder of the Society of Jesus, Francis Xavier, whose example many Goan missionaries tried to emulate by engaging in evangelizing work in Asia, was shipped to Goa on 11 December 1553. Goa has also produced its own saints: the martyrs of Cuncolim; St. Joseph Vaz, whose missionary exploits in Sri Lanka are remembered with gratitude in that country; and the Venerable Agnelo de Souza.

The 16th-century monument, the cathedral or Sé, was constructed during Portugal's Golden Age, and is the largest church in Asia, as well as larger than any church in Portugal. The church is 250 ft in length and 181 ft in breadth. The frontispiece stands 115 ft high. The cathedral is dedicated to St. Catherine of Alexandria and is also known as St. Catherine's Cathedral. It was on her feast day in 1510 that Afonso de Albuquerque defeated the Muslim army and took possession of the city of Goa.

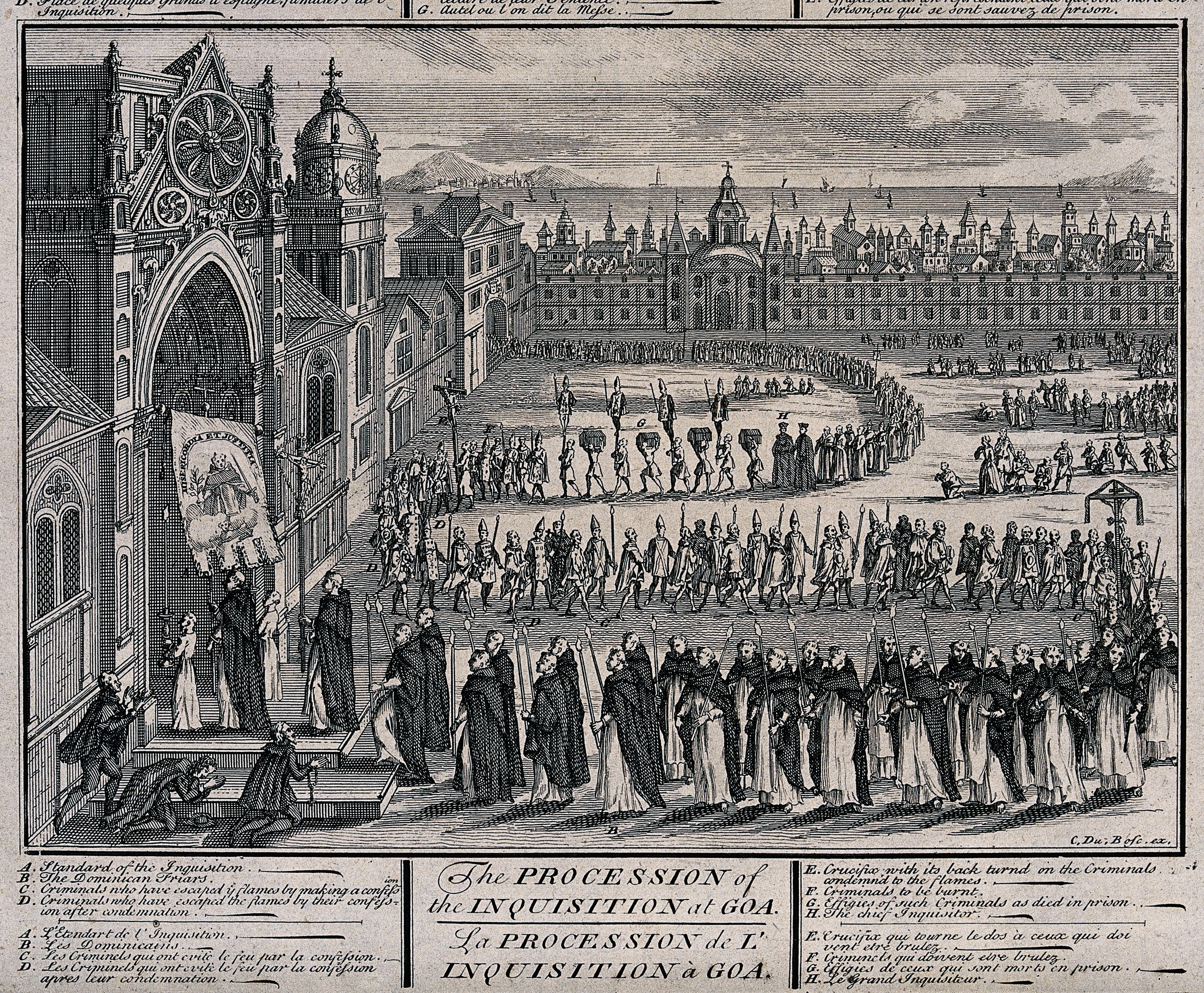
The Auto-da-fé procession of the Inquisition at Goa. The Goa Inquisition, which was established in 1560 and abolished in 1820, persecuted Hindus, Muslims, and other religious minorities

The Goa Inquisition was the office of the Inquisition acting within the Indian state of Goa and the rest of the Portuguese empire in Asia. It was established in 1560, briefly suppressed from 1774 to 1778, and finally abolished in 1812. Based on the records that survive, H. P. Salomon and I. S. D. Sassoon state that between the Inquisition's beginning in 1561 and its temporary abolition in 1774, some 16,202 persons were brought to trial. Of this number, only 57 were sentenced to death and executed; another 64 were burned in effigy. Most were subjected to lesser punishments or penances.

The Inquisition was established to punish New Christians who continued practicing their ancestral religion in secret. Many Sephardic Jews (as falsely-converted Catholics) had immigrated to Goa from the Iberian Peninsula. Due to persecution by the Inquisition, most left and migrated to Fort St. George (later Madras/Chennai) and Cochin, where the English and the Dutch allowed them to be openly Jewish. In Goa the Inquisition also scrutinised Indian converts from Hinduism or Islam who were thought to have returned to their original ways. It prosecuted non-converts who broke prohibitions against the observance of Hindu or Muslim rites, or interfered with Portuguese attempts to convert non-Christians to Catholicism. Goan Inquisition was abolished in 1812.

=== Relations with neighboring powers ===
Bijapur

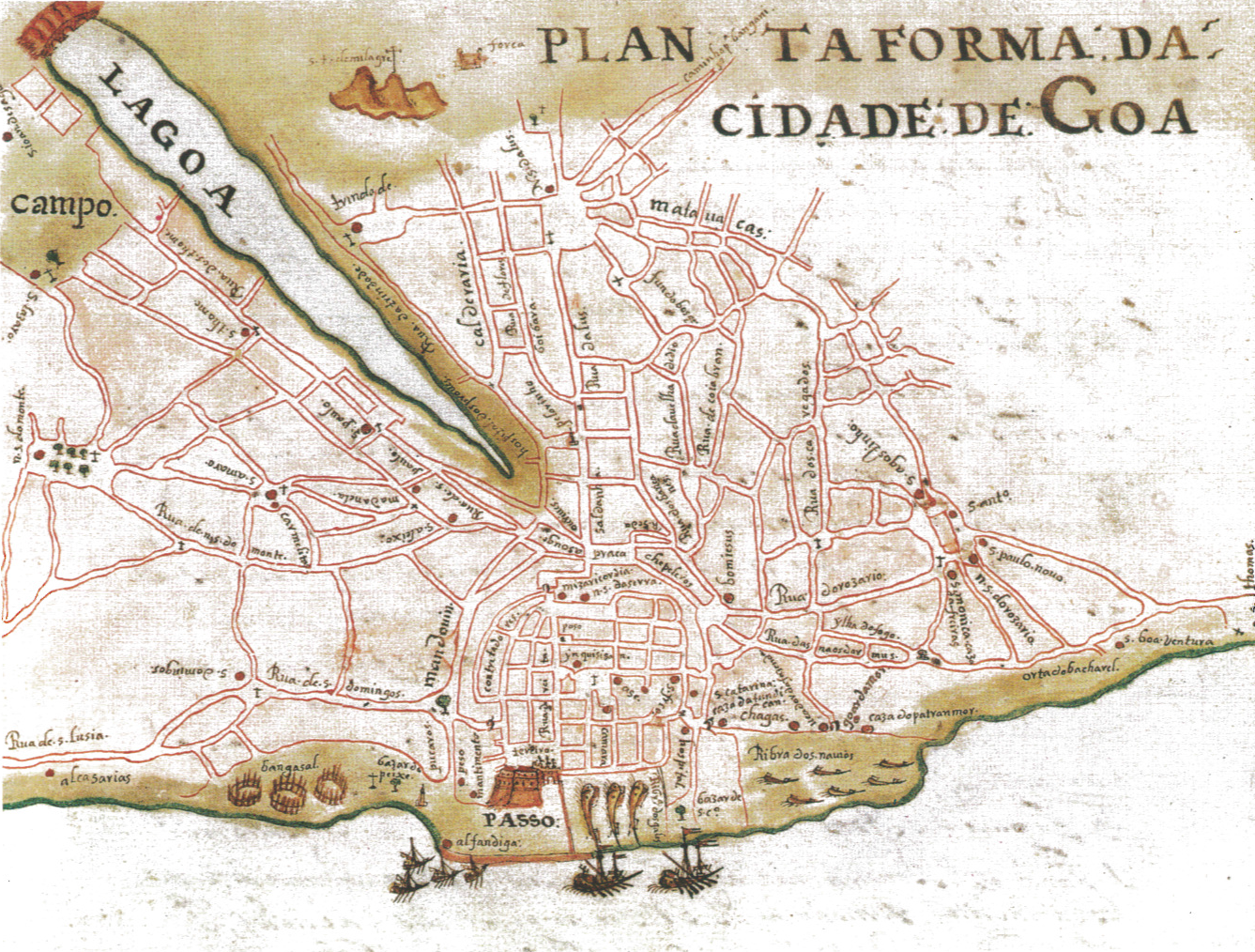
1620 map of Goa

When the Portuguese arrived in Goa, they encountered the established regime of the Sultanate of Bijapur under Yusuf Adil Shah (1450-1510). The Adil Shah (written Hidalcão by the Portuguese) controlled Goa (and significant territory of the Sultanate) from his distant, inland capital. Led by Afonso de Albuquerque, in alliance with Timoji, their 1510 attack ended in Portuguese victory. Bijapur lost Goa, but continued as a large, local power. In 1565 Bijapur and other Deccan Sultanates in a jihad destroyed the capital of the Hindu Empire Vijayanagara, an ally of the Portuguese. From the spoils Bijapur doubled its size. In 1571 Bijapur in an alliance of mostly Muslim sultanates (Ahmadnagar, Bijapur, Calicut, Aceh) launched determined attacks on Goa, which failed. The defeat of this siege of Goa proved decisive.

Kanara

The Kanara coastal regions lay immediately south of Goa. Many small principalities, largely autonomous, were under Vijayanagara, then Bijapur. Timoji, who played a role in the 1510 capture of Goa, was from Kanara, e.g., Honavar. Goa traded with various Kanara rulers, which was an important source of rice for domestic consumption; other goods were pepper for export and timber for ships building. The Portuguese had built a fort and ran a factory in Kanara, and were often in effective local control. The Nayak rulers of the Keladi ruling family, however, began to dispute with Goa over the prices paid for trade goods, and other issues. Goa was not able to pay the increases demanded. A series of treaties were nonetheless negotiated. Then hostile Dutch influence increased and Arabs from Muscat began to compete with Goa for the Kanara trade.

Mughal

When Akbar (r. 1555–1605) ruled the Mughal Empire, he endeavored to harmonize the empire's conflicting religions. At Akbar's court, rival Muslim clerics had heated debates. At his new capital Fatehpur Sikri, meetings at his Ibadat Khana [House of Worship] more variously included "Muslim scholars, Hindu pandits, Parsi mobeds, and Jain sadhus". Akbar "invited Jesuits from Goa" but no Buddhists were in proximity. Conferring privately with Jesuits, Akbar discussed Christianity and Abrahamic theology. In 1582 Akbar promulgated a syncretic Din-i-Ilahi [Divine Faith]. "The crucial question about Akbar's religious activity is whether he established a new religion or new spiritual order." Either way, his efforts came to nought.

Goa enjoyed a flourishing trade with Gujarat, when Akbar annexed it in 1573. Agreeable relations were worked out, however, allowing the Portuguese at Diu to continue to issue cartazes and collect duties on the sea trade. In 1602 the English arrived in Asia and pirated a loaded Portuguese merchant ship off Malacca. In 1608 with 25,000 pieces of gold an English captain arranged for rights at Surat, the Mughal Empire's principle trading port. This led to a two-year war between the Mughals and the Portuguese, ending with a feckless treaty in 1615. The Mughals, then dominant in India but weak at sea, began to play the Europeans off against each other. Under Emperor Aurangzeb (r. 1658–1707), the Mughals became frustrated by their war against the Marathas. Goa remained neutral, but once praised Shivaji's valor.

Dutch

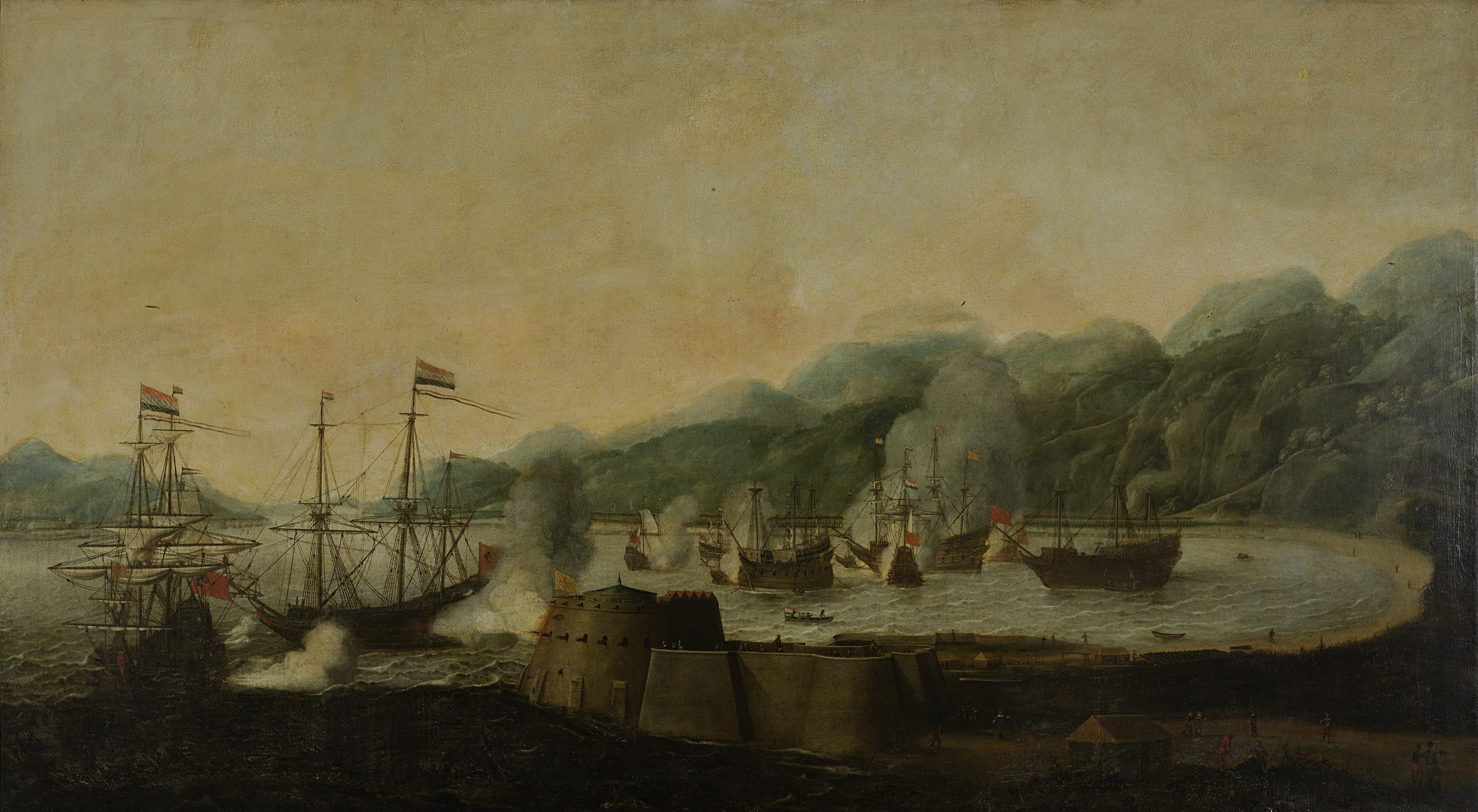
Naval battle at Goa between Dutch and Portuguese warships in 1639.

In 1595 there first appeared in Indian waters ships of the Dutch United East India Company (Dutch: Vereenigde Oostindische Compagnie or VOC). Until then, for almost a century, the Portuguese had managed to keep secret their "more detailed information about India," especially their "priceless Portuguese navigation maps". Yet Jan Huygen van Linschoten, who had worked in Goa, in 1592 came away with the coveted knowledge which "taught the Dutch how to use the monsoon winds to their best advantage." Also unfortunately for Portugal, Spain had initiated the Iberian Union, which united the two countries. Additionally, the Dutch and the Spanish were then fighting their Eighty Years' War. In 1600 against Goa the Dutch allied with regional Muslim forces (the Sultanate of Bijapur); then the Dutch made war on Goa. The long-term result of these hostilities was the undoing of Portuguese naval dominion in the Indian Ocean and a loss of its preeminence in sea trade. In 1603 and 1639, the city was blockaded by Dutch fleets, though never captured. The Dutch East India Company were defeated at the Travancore–Dutch War, which stifled their influence in the region.

Vijayanagara

The Vijayanagara Empire (1336-1646) ruled vast lands in South India when the Portuguese arrived in Goa. The empire's rise as a great power was said to encompass a "mission of upholding the Hindu cause against Islam." Vijayanagara had earlier governed Goa; its ruler Vira Narasimha Raya (r. 1505–1509) contemplated retaking it, but soon died. Krishna Deva Raya (r. 1509–1529) then succeeded as ruler, said to be the empire's best. The Portuguese then were aggressively establishing control of maritime trade routes and coastal ports in Cochin and Goa. The regional political rivalries developed so that Vijayanagara and Goa remained aligned as friendly powers. The Portuguese supplied Vijayanagara with Persian horses. A Portuguese engineer improved irrigation for lands of Krishna Deva Raya. Vijayanagara was ultimately defeated in 1646 by an alliance of Deccan sultanates. So vital was this alliance to Goa, that Goa lost much of its importance after the fall of Vijayanagara.

There began a gradual drop in Goa's prosperity. In 1635 Goa was ravaged by an epidemic. Jean de Thévenot in 1666, Baldaeus in 1672, and Fryer in 1675 described Goa in decline.

Maratha

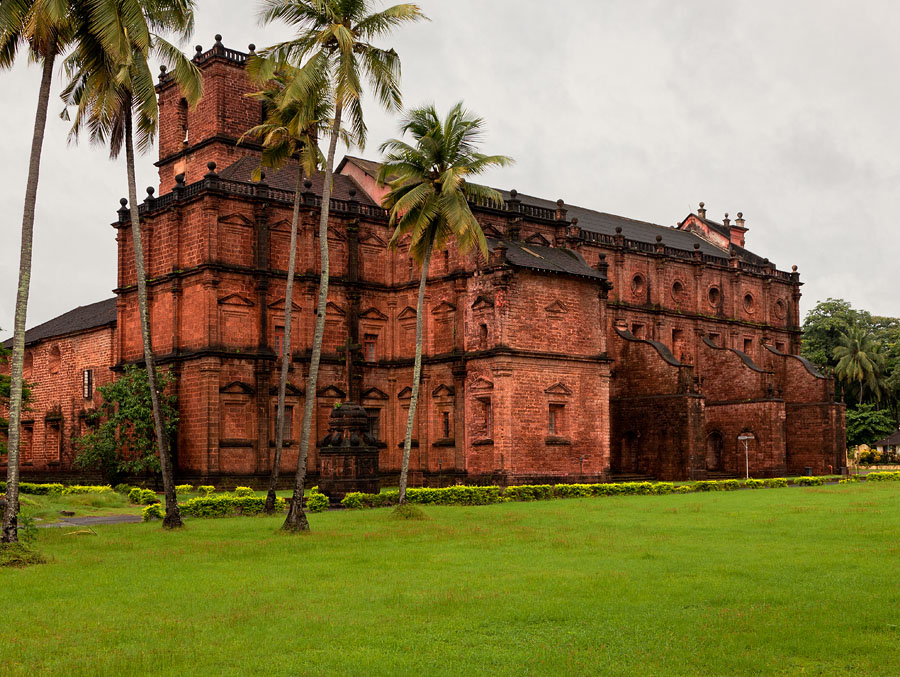
Basilica of Bom Jesus, 2010

The Maratha Empire (1674-1818) to the north grew steadily in strength, far surpassing that of the Mughal Empire, let alone Goa. After his escape from Aurangzeb in Agra, the Maratha ruler Chhatrapati Shivaji (1627-1680) started a counterattack to recoup lands lost to the Mughals through the Treaty of Purandar (1665). Against Goa, Chhatrapati Shivaji mounted an invasion that subdued the region adjoining the Old Conquestas. He captured Pernem, Bicholim, Sattari, Ponda, Sanguem, Quepem and Canacona from the Portuguese. Sawantwadi Bhonsale and Saudekar Rajas became his vassals.

The Maratha Chhatrapati Sambhaji (1657-1689), the son of C. Shivaji, tried in 1683 to conquer all of Goa. Chh. Sambhaji almost ousted the remaining Portuguese, but suddenly a Mughal army appeared which prevented the Maratha from completing their conquest, resulting in the culmination of the Deccan wars. In 1739-1740 the territory of Bardez in north Goa was attacked by the Marathas, in order to pressure the Portuguese at Vasai. The plan of conquest, however, was forestalled with "the payment of a large war indemnity."

In June 1756 a Maratha Army invading Goa killed in action Luís Mascarenhas, Count of Alva (Conde de Alva), the Portuguese Viceroy. The Marathas, however faced an invasion from Afghan, resulting in their defeat at the Third Battle of Panipat (1761). The Maratha Peshwa's overall control slackened throughout India. The Portuguese then defeated the regional Rajas of Sawantwadi and the Raja of Sunda to reconquer an area from Pernem to Canacona. This territory formed the Novas Conquistas, within the boundaries of present-day Goa. Following the Battle of Panipat, the Mughals retained their friendly relationship with the Portuguese.

English

The long Dutch war described above led Portugal to seek an alliance with the English, which proved costly. The Dutch war did finally end in 1663. In 1665 the English demanded in payment the cession of Bombay. Officially it was part of the dowry of Catherine of Braganza on her ill-starred marriage to Charles II. Though at first active rivals in India after the English East India Company arrived in 1601, the two latter attempted to coordinate against common enemies. The Maratha-derived "pirate" fleet led by the independent Kanhoji Angre inspired such an uneasy alliance. The 1721 Anglo-Portuguese naval attack on Culaba, the Angria stronghold, was repulsed. It was a fiasco that then embittered the partnership.

Ragusan

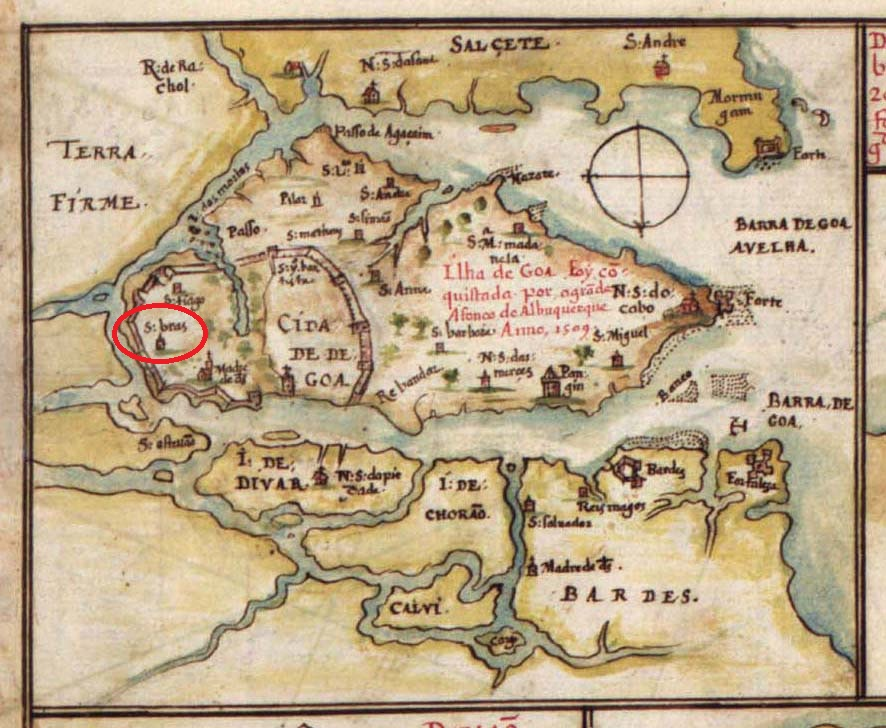
Map of "Sao Braz" in Goa, 1630

The Republic of Ragusa, part of the modern-day Dalmatian coast of Croatia, was permitted to establish a small colonial settlement in Goa by the Portuguese between 1530 and 1535. Named after the patron saint of Dubrovnik, settlers established Sao Braz, a Ragusan colony in the modern-day village of Gandaulim. The Ragusan settlers collaborated closely with the Portuguese, who purportedly saw them as master shipbuilders or seasoned traders in Southeast Europe. Goese historian Gomes Catão documented the town to have a population of 12,000 settlers. The 1667 Dubrovnik earthquake destroyed the city of Dubrovnik which left the Ragusan Republic financially strained. Trading disputes with Portuguese merchants and declining trade with Goans forced the Republic of Ragusa to surrender their colony.

=== Estado da India: 18th and 19th centuries ===
In 1757, King Joseph I of Portugal issued a decree, developed by his minister Marquês de Pombal, granting Portuguese citizenship to all subjects in the Portuguese Indies, with the right to be represented in the Portuguese Parliament. Pombal (1699-1782), an anti-Catholic Freemason, served the King as the de facto leader of Portugal, 1750–1777. The enclaves of Goa, Damão, Diu, Dadra and Nagar Haveli became collectively known as the Estado da Índia Portuguesa. The first election was held in Goa on 14 January 1822. Three local citizens were elected as members of the Portuguese parliament. From their first arrival, the Portuguese intermarried among the converted natives of Goa. They produced Luso-Indian offspring, who were also Catholic. In 1787, some disgruntled priests attempted a rebellion against Portuguese rule. It was known as the Conspiracy of the Pintos. Goa was peacefully occupied by the British between 1812 and 1815 in line with the Anglo-Portuguese Alliance during the Napoleonic Wars.

The viceroy transferred his residence from the vicinity of Goa city to New Goa (in Portuguese Nova Goa), today's Panaji. In 1843 this was made the official seat of government; it completed a move that had been discussed as early as 1684. Old Goa city's population fell steeply during the 18th century as Europeans moved to the new city. Old Goa has been designated a World Heritage Site by UNESCO because of its history and architecture. The Goa civil code was introduced in 1869 after Portuguese Goa and Damaon were elevated from being mere Portuguese colonies to the status of a Província Ultramarina (Overseas possession).

=== Second World War ===
Goa was neutral during the conflict like Portugal. As a result, at the outbreak of hostilities a number of Axis ships sought refuge in Goa rather than be sunk or captured by the British Royal Navy. Three German merchants ships, the Ehrenfels, the Drachenfels and the Braunfels, as well as an Italian ship, took refuge in the port of Mormugao. The Ehrenfels began transmitting Allied ship movements to the U-boats operating in the Indian Ocean, an action that was extremely damaging to Allied shipping.

But the British Royal Navy was unable to take any official action against these ships because of Goa's stated neutrality. Instead the Indian mission of SOE backed a covert raid using members from the Calcutta Light Horse, a part-time unit made up of civilians who were not eligible for normal war service. The Light Horse embarked on an ancient Calcutta riverboat, the Phoebe, and sailed round India to Goa, where they sunk the Ehrenfels. The British then sent a decrypted radio message announcing it was going to seize the territory. This bluff made the other Axis crews scuttle their ships fearing they could be seized by British forces.

The raid was covered in the book Boarding Party by James Leasor. Due to the potential political ramifications of the fact that Britain had violated Portuguese neutrality, the raid remained secret until the book was published in 1978. In 1980 the story was made into the film, The Sea Wolves, starring Gregory Peck, David Niven and Roger Moore.

=== Independence Movement ===
In 1955 a group of unarmed civilians, the Satyagrahis, demonstrated against Portugal. At least twenty-two of them were killed by Portuguese gunfire.

When India became independent in 1947, Goa remained under Portuguese control. The Indian government of Jawaharlal Nehru demanded that Goa, along with a few other minor Portuguese holdings, be turned over to India. However, Portugal refused due to Goa being an integral part of Portugal since 1510. By contrast, France, which also had small enclaves in India (most notably Puducherry), surrendered all its Indian possessions relatively quickly.

In 1954, a horde of armed Indians flooded into and took over the tiny land-locked enclaves of Dadra and Nagar Haveli. This incident led the Portuguese to lodge a complaint against India in the International Court of Justice at The Hague. The final judgement on this case, given in 1960, held that the Portuguese had a right to the enclaves, but that India equally had a right to deny Portugal access to the enclaves over Indian territory.

In 1955 a group of unarmed civilians, the Satyagrahis, demonstrated against Portugal. At least twenty-two of them were killed by Portuguese gunfire.

Later the same year, these non-Goan Satyagrahis took over a fort at Tiracol and hoisted the Indian flag. They were driven out of Goa by the Portuguese with a number of casualties. On 1 September 1955, the Indian consulate in Goa was closed using this incident as an excuse; Nehru declared that his government would not tolerate the Portuguese presence in Goa. India then instituted a blockade against Goa, Damão, and Diu in an effort to force a Portuguese departure. Goa was then given its own airline by the Portuguese, the Transportes Aéreos da Índia Portuguesa, to overcome the blockade.

== Indian annexation of Goa ==
On 27 February 1950, the Government of India asked the Portuguese government to open negotiations about the future of Portuguese colonies in India. Portugal asserted that its territory on the Indian subcontinent was not a colony but part of metropolitan Portugal and hence its transfer was non-negotiable, and that India had no rights to this territory because the Republic of India did not exist at the time when Goa came under Portuguese rule. On 18 December 1961, Indian troops crossed the border into Goa and liberated it. Operation Vijay involved sustained land, sea and air strikes for more than thirty-six hours; it resulted in the unconditional surrender of Portuguese forces on 19 December 1961 by Manuel António Vassalo e Silva.

A United Nations resolution condemning the invasion was proposed by the United States and the United Kingdom in the United Nations Security Council, but it was vetoed by the USSR. Goa celebrates Liberation Day on 19 December every year, which is also a state holiday.

== Post-Liberation (1961–present) ==
=== As a Union Territory (1961–1987) ===
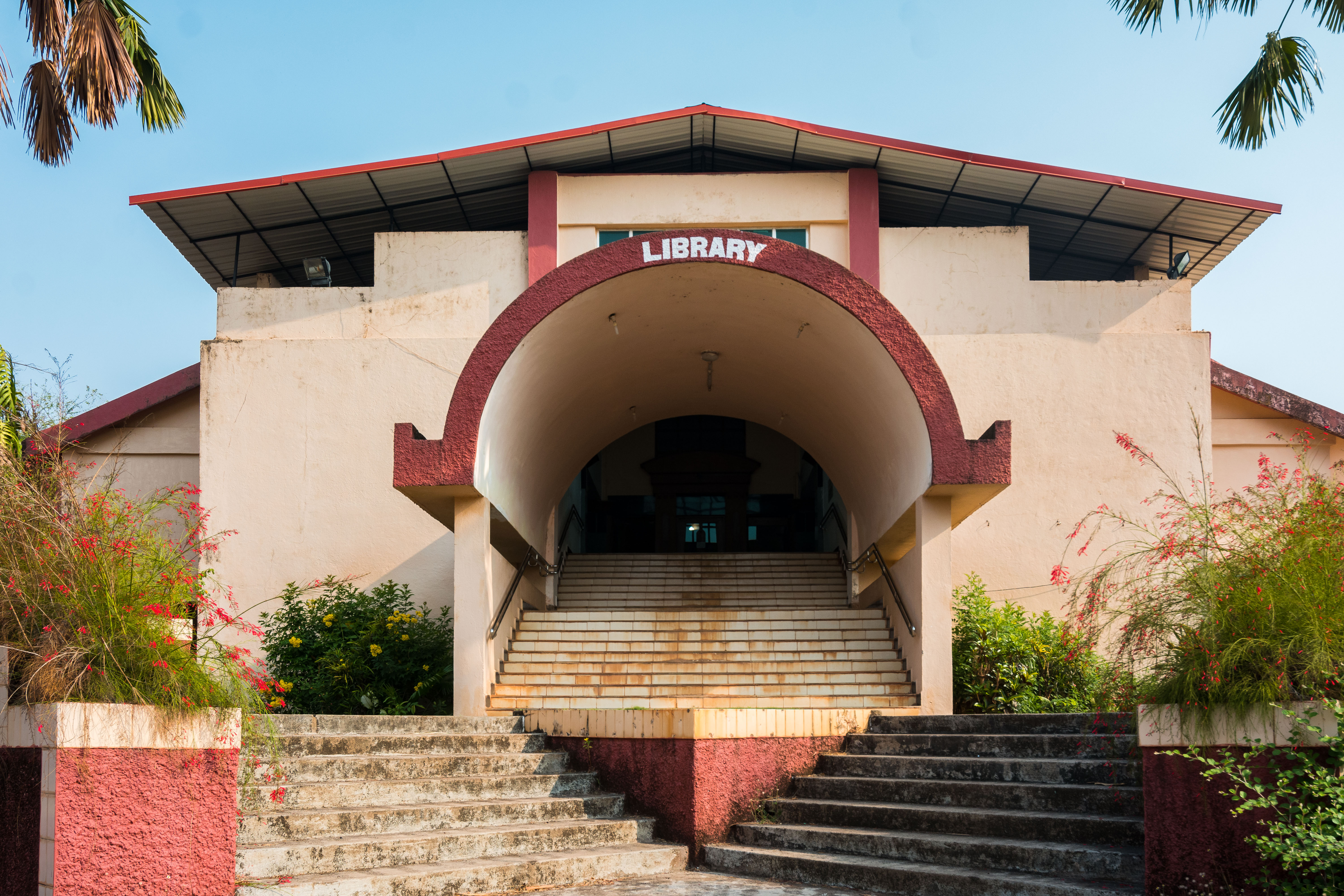
The Goa University was established in 1985

The territory of Goa, Daman and Diu was a union territory of India from 19 December 1961 to 30 May 1987. Its official language was declared to be Marathi, much to the anger of the majority of the native Goans.

After a brief period of military rule, on 8 June 1962, military rule was replaced by civilian government when the Lieutenant Governor Kunhiraman Palat Candeth nominated an informal Consultative Council of 29 nominated members to assist him in the administration of the territory. Dayanand Bandodkar of the Maharashtrawadi Gomantak Party was elected as the first Chief Minister of Goa, Daman and Diu. He attempted to merge Goa with Maharashtra by importing Marathi immigrants from the neighbouring state (Goa's population increased by almost 35% in the 1960s due to heavy immigration of Marathi people), but his plans were foiled by the Goa Opinion Poll.

=== State of Goa (1987–present) ===
In February 1987, the Indian government finally recognized Konkani as the official language of Goa. Goa was later admitted to Indian statehood in May 1987. Pratapsingh Rane, who had previously served as Chief Minister of Goa, Daman and Diu, was elected as the first Chief Minister of the newly formed state.

Goa has a high GDP per capita and Human Development Index compared to most Indian states.

== See also ==
- Portuguese conquest of Goa
- Goa Inquisition
- Goan Catholics under the British Indian Empire
- Sackings of Goa and Bombay-Bassein
- History of Goan Catholics
- Timeline of Goan history
- Battle of Goa (1638)
- Annexation of Goa
- List of peers and fidalgos in Portuguese India

== Notes ==
- Gune, Vithal Trimbak (1979) Gazetteer of the Union Territory Goa, Daman and Diu: Goa (Goa)
- Nayak, K.D (1968) Gomantakachi sanskrutic ghadan [in Marathi] (Margao: Gomant Vidya Niketan)

== Bibliography ==
- Asia Recorder. K. K. Thomas at Recorder Press. 1962.
- Banerjea, D., Goa, 2002 (Allied Publishers 2005) Criminal Justice India Series ISBN 9788177645170.
- Bhagamandala Seetharama Shastry & Charles J. Borges, Goa-Kanara Portuguese Relations, 1498-1763
- De Souza, Teotonio R., Goa Through the Ages: An economic history, vol. 2. (Concept Publishing Co. 1990)
- De Souza, Teotonio R., Medieval Goa. A socio-economic history (Goa: Goa,1556 1979, 2d ed. 2009)
- Krishna Ayyar, K. V., A short history of Kerala (Ernakulam: Pai & Co. 1966)
- Nayak, K. D., Gomantakachi sanskrutic ghadan [Marathi] (Margao: Gomant Vidya Niketan 1968)
- Panikkar, K. M., Malabar and the Portuguese (1929; reprint New Delhi: Voice of India 2016)
- Pearson, M. N., The Portuguese in India (Cambridge University 1988)
- Priolkar, Anant, The Goa Inquisition, Being a Quatercentenary Commemoration Study of the Inquisition in India (Bombay University Press)
- Rao, R. P., Portuguese rule in Goa: 1510-1961 (Bombay: Asia Publishing House 1963)
- Sakshena, R. N., Goa: Into the Mainstream (Abhinav Publications 2003) ISBN 9788170170051.
- Satoskar, Ba. Da, Gomantak prakruti ani sanskuti, khand II [Marathi] (Pune: Shubhda publishers 1982)
  - De Souza, Teotonio R., editor, Indo-Portuguese History. Old issues, new questions (Delhi: Naurang Rai Concept 1985)

Articles

- Bhat, N. S. (2013). "History of Goa with Special Reference to its Feudal Features". Indian Historical Review. 40 (2): 249–266. doi:10.1177/0376983613499680. S2CID 145048379.
- Boxer, C.R. "Golden Goa 1510-1954." History Today (Nov 1954) 4#11 pp 754–763.
- Gune, Vithal Trimbak (1979) Gazetteer of the Union Territory Goa, Daman and Diu: Goa (Goa)

Secondary

- Boxer, C. R., The Portuguese Seaborne Empire, 1415-1825 (New York: Knopf 1969)
- Chaudhuri, K. N., Trade and Civilisation in the Indian Ocean (Cambridge University 1985)
- Davies, C. Collin, An Historical Atlas of the Indian Peninsula (Oxford University 2d ed. 1949)
- De Mendonça, Délio. Conversions and Citizenry: Goa under Portugal, 1510-1610 (2002) online.
- Diffie and Winius, Foundations of the Portuguese Empire, 1415-1580 (University of Minnesota 1977)
- Henn, Alexander. Hindu-Catholic encounters in Goa: Religion, colonialism, and modernity (Indiana University Press, 2014) online.
- Ikram, A. J., Muslim civilization in India (New York: Columbia University 1964)
- Jayasuriya, Shihan de Silva. The Portuguese in the East: A Cultural History of a Maritime Trading Empire (2008)
- Panikkar, K. M., A survey of Indian History (New York: Asia Publishing House 1947, 4th ed. 1964)
- Russell-Wood, A. J. R., The Portuguese Empire, 1415-1808: A World on the Move
- Sarker, Himansu Bhusan, Trade and commercial activities of Southern India in the Malayo-Indonesian world (Calcutta: Firma KLM 1986)
- Sastri, K. A. Nilakanta, A History of South India. From prehistoric times to the fall of Vijayanagara (1947; New Delhi: Oxford University 4th ed. 1975)
- Smith, Vincent, Oxford History of India (3d ed. 1958), edited by Percival Spear.
- Subrahmanyam, Sanjay, The Portuguese empire in Asia, 1500-1700: A political and economic history (2012)
- Wolpert, Stanley, A New History of India (Oxford University 1977, 7th ed. 2004)
