= P. P. Shirodkar =

P. P. Shirodkar may refer to:

- Pandurang Purushottam Shirodkar (1916–2000), Indian freedom fighter, author, lawyer and politician
- Prakashchandra Pandurang Shirodkar (1941–2021), Indian indologist, archaeologist, and writer
