= Goan Catholics under the British Indian Empire =

Goan Catholics are Christians from Goa, Daman and Diu on the western coast of India. They are Konkani people and speak the Konkani language. Most of this indigenous population of the erstwhile Portuguese colony of Goa, Daman and Diu underwent Christianisation following the Portuguese conquest of Goa in 1510. The converts in the Velhas Conquistas (Old Conquests) to Roman Catholicism were then granted full Portuguese citizenship.

Several Goan Catholics emigrated for economic reasons to various British colonies during the British Raj, thereby creating diaspora communities such as Pakistani Goans and Goans in the Swindon area of the UK.

== History ==
Goans first worked for the British in 1779 at the time of the French Revolution, when the naval fleet of the British India was stationed in Goa. The British found the Christian Goans were eminently suitable because of their Western dress, diet and customs and when the fleets withdrew from Goa some time afterward, the Goans went with them. Goans who trained at the medical school also moved to other Portuguese colonies around 1842 after the first medical school was created Goans migrated to British India as well where there were more opportunities and economic development was occurring, which led to a demand for English language schools for these migrants which surpassed that of those educated in Portuguese. However, such was the demand that Goans began sending their children to neighbouring cities such as Bombay, Poona and Belgaum. Employment opportunities also arose in Karachi before the Indian Partition.

== Goans in Karachi ==
Portuguese Goan community played a vital role in the Karachi's history and development. Portuguese Goan community started migrating to Karachi in the 1820s as traders. The majority of the estimated 100,000 who came to Pakistan are primarily concentrated in Karachi.

In 1886 the Goa-Portuguese Association was established, with L.C. Gomes as the first President. Cincinnatus Fabian D'Abreo was instrumental in starting the Association. In 1936 the name of the Goa-Portuguese Association was changed to the Karachi Goan Association (KGA) with C.M. Lobo as its first President.

In 1886, Cincinnatus Fabian D'Abreo, helped found ILACO (formerly Indian Life Assurance Co) in Karachi. In 1926, Cincinnatus and other pioneering Goans also established Karachi's first township namely "Cincinnatus Town" (later to be called Garden East).

Manuel Misquita, twice served as President of the Karachi Goan Association, first from 1941 to 1942 and then again in 1954. In 1946, Manuel Misquita was Mayor of Karachi under the British Raj and many Goans were councilors in the Karachi Metropolitan Corporation (KMC). Many roads in Karachi -- including Britto Road, Pedro D'Souza Road, D'Cruz Road, D'Abreo Street, Nazareth Street, and DeSilva Street -- were named after pioneering Goans.

Population of Goans in Karachi stood at some 6,000 Goans, down from around 15,000 Goans in the 1950s and 60s, as per Menin Rodrigues, the author of ‘Goans of Pakistan – Footprints on the Sands of Time,’ .

== See also ==
- Catholic Church in India
- Goan Catholics
- History of Goa
- History of Goan Catholics
