= History of Goan Catholics =

History of Goan Catholics recounts the history of the Goan Catholic community of the Indian state of Goa from their conversion to Christianity to date.

== Pre-Portuguese era ==
No concrete evidence has been found that Christianity prevailed in Goa before the Portuguese arrived, but it is believed that St. Bartholomew, one of the twelve Apostles of Jesus Christ, brought and spread the Gospel in Konkan including Goa, just as St. Thomas had done in Kerala and Tamil Nadu in Southern India.

== Portuguese era ==
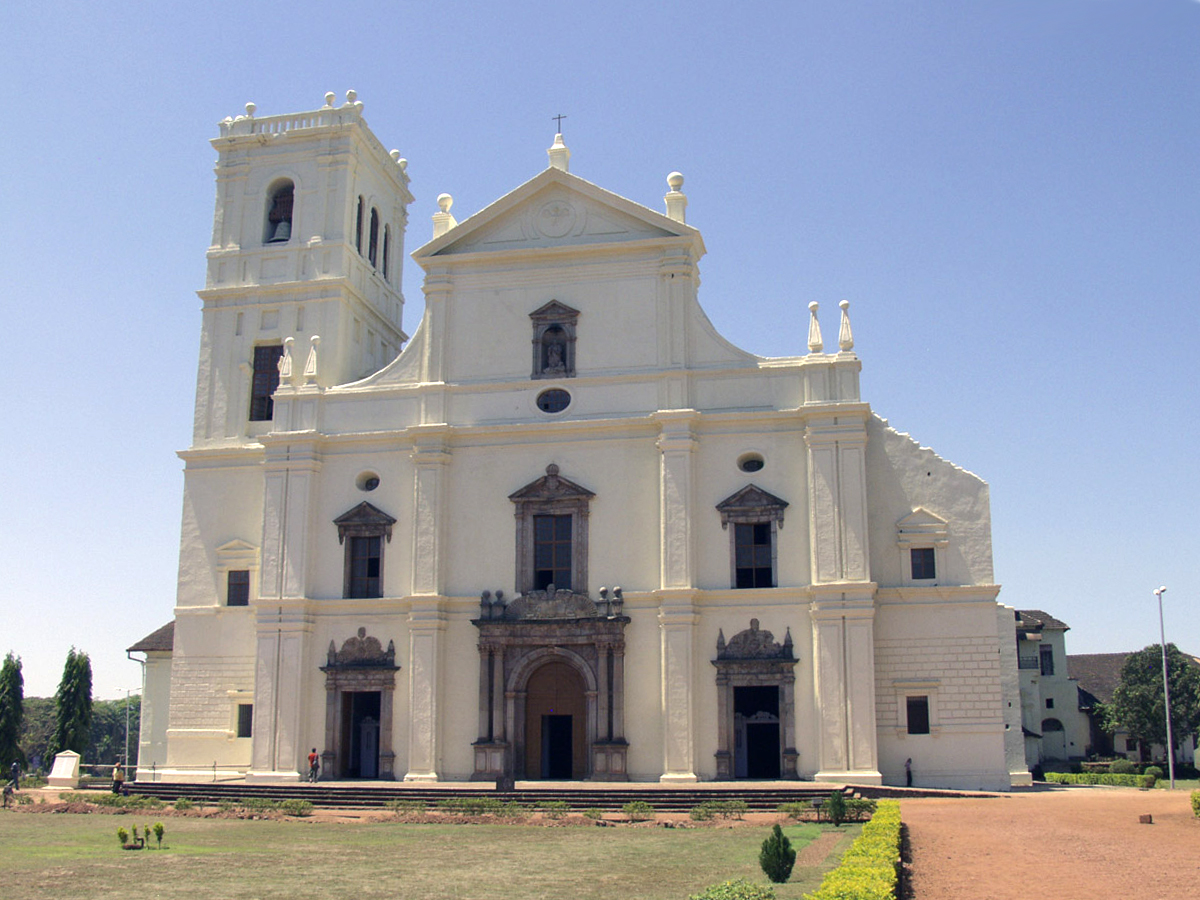
The Se Cathedral is a cathedral dedicated to Catherine of Alexandria, located in Old Goa

In the 15th century, the Portuguese explored the sea route to India and Pope Nicholas V enacted the Papal bull Romanus Pontifex. This bull granted the patronage of the propagation of the Christian faith in Asia to the Portuguese (see "Padroado") and rewarded them with a trade monopoly for newly discovered areas. After Vasco da Gama arrived at Calicut on the coast of Kerala in India in 1498, the trade became prosperous. In 1510, the Portuguese wrested Goa from the Sultan of Bijapur and finally established themselves in Goa. By 1544, they conquered the districts of Bardez and Salcette in Goa. The initial converts were the native Goan women who married the Portuguese men that had arrived with Afonso de Albuquerque during the Portuguese conquest of Goa.

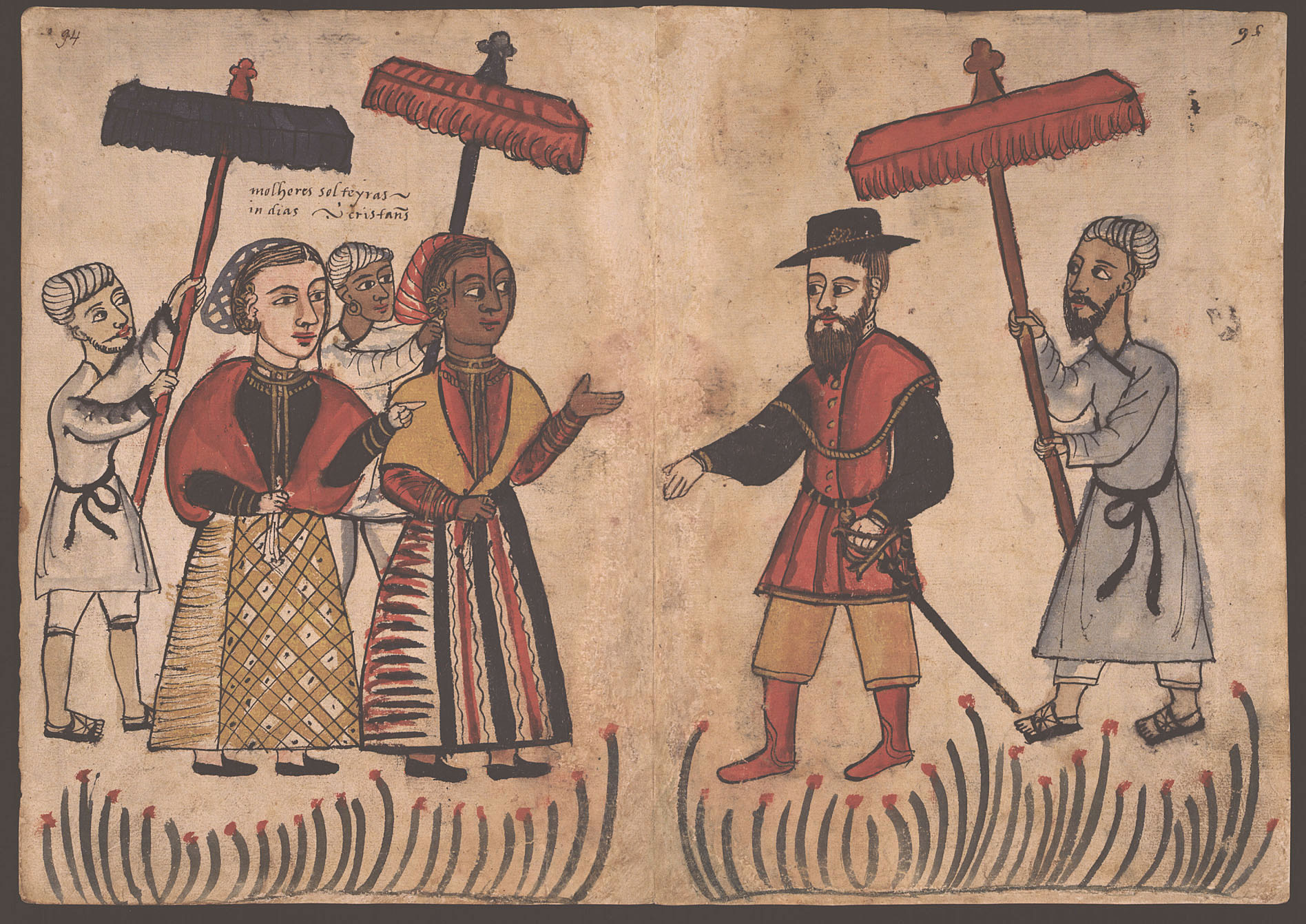
Christian maidens of Goa meeting a Portuguese nobleman seeking a wife, circa 1540

In 1534, the Archdiocese of Goa was established. Soon missionaries of the newly founded Society of Jesus were sent to Goa, which led to the conversion of entire villages to Christianity.

Many of the Goan Catholic ancestors of the present Mangalorean Catholic community fled Goa because of the Goa Inquisition introduced by the Portuguese in 1560. King John III of Portugal decreed that every trace of Hindu customs be eradicated through the Inquisition. Those who refused to comply with the rules laid down by the Inquisition left Goa and settled outside the Portuguese dominion. About 7,000 of them, mostly Bammons (Brahmins) and Sarodis (Kshatriyas), fled Goa and Damaon. Most migrated to South Canara in what is called the "First Wave of Migration".

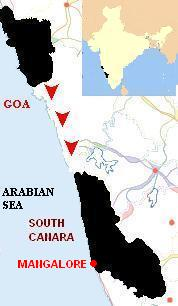
The path of migration of Goan Catholics towards South Canara

The War of the League of the Indies took place in the 1570s and ended the Vijayanagar Empire in the region. Fearing persecution, many Catholics from Goa migrated to South Canara. This migration is referred to as the "Second Wave of Migration".

The Scottish physician Francis Buchanan visited Canara in 1801. In his book, A Journey from Madras through the Countries of Mysore, Canara and Malabar (1807), he stated that "80,000 Goan Christians came and settled in South Canara at the invitation of the King of Bednore." Later, this was identified as a probable mistake and should have read "8,000". However even this figure included the second emigration of Christians from Goa.

The attacks of the Maratha Empire on Goa, during the mid 17th century, was also a cause of migration. In 1664, Shivaji, the founder of the Maratha empire, attacked Kudal, a town north of Goa, and began his campaign for Goa. After Shivaji's death on 3 April 1680, his son Sambhaji ascended to the throne. The onslaught of Sambhaji, along the northern territories of Goa, drove many Christians from their homelands, and most of them migrated to South Canara. This migration is referred to as the "Third Wave of Migration". During the later years, 1680-1707, the migration slowed because of the Mughal-Maratha wars. Some 10,000 Christians returned to Goa. From the Bardez district of Goa, Jesuit priests estimated that 12,000 Christians migrated to the South of Goa between 1710–1712. A Goa Government report of 1747 recorded that around 5,000 Christians fled to South Canara from the Bardez and Tiswadi districts of Goa during the invasion of the Marathas. It was estimated that during the Maratha raids on Goa, about 60,000 Christians migrated to South Canara.

== Modern era ==
In 1787, inspired by the French Revolution, several Goan Catholic priests, unhappy with the process of promotion within the Church and other discriminatory practices of the Portuguese, organized the Pinto Revolt against the Portuguese. Though it was an unsuccessful revolt, it was the first open revolt against the Portuguese from within Goa. In 1843, the capital was moved to Panjim and by the mid-18th century the area under occupation by the Portuguese expanded to Goa's present day limits. By this time the Portuguese Empire started declining and further resistance to their occupation in Goa started gaining momentum. After the rest of India gained independence in 1947 Portugal refused to relinquish Goa. On 18 December 1961, India moved in with troops and after hostilities that lasted 36 hours, forced the Portuguese administration to surrender. On 30 May 1987, Goa was elevated as India's 25th state.

During the 1970s, coastal communication increased between Bombay and Goa, after introduction of ships by the London-based trade firm Shepherd. These ships facilitated the entry of Goan Catholics to Bombay.

== See also ==
- Catholic Church in India
- Goan Catholics
- Goan Catholics under the British Empire
- History of Goa
