= Prakashchandra Pandurang Shirodkar =

Indian academic (1941–2021)

- Shirodkar in c. 2009
- Born: 1941; Goa, Portuguese India
- Died: 6 May 2021 (aged 79–80); Bengaluru, Karnataka, India
- Occupations: Writer; archaeologist; historian
- Father: Pandurang Purushottam Shirodkar

Prakashchandra Pandurang Shirodkar (1941 – 6 May 2021), also known as P. P. Shirodkar, was an Indian indologist, archaeologist, and writer. He is known for his contributions in archaeology. He was the founding editor of two research journals, Colloquium and Purābhileka-Purātatva.

== Personal life ==
Shirodkar was the eldest son of Pandurang Purushottam Shirodkar, an independence activist from Goa, and also served as the first speaker of the Goa, Daman and Diu Legislative Assembly.

== Career ==
In 1993, Shirodkar discovered rock art engravings on lateritic platforms and granite boulders from Usgalimal on the banks of west-flowing river Kushavati, which has shed light on the prehistory of Goa and the existence of humans in Goa during the Paleolithic and Mesolithic.

== Death ==
Shirodkar died on 6 May 2021 due to ill health.

== Bibliography ==
Year	Title	Location	Publisher
1961	Goa's Freedom Struggle: Selected Writings of T. B. Cunha	Goa	T. B. Cunha Memorial Committee
1979	Kolhāpūra-portugeja saṃbaṃdha: Govā purābhilekha saṃgrahālayāṃtūna nivaḍalele kāgada	Kolhāpūra	Yaśavaṃtarava Saṃ. Taste
1988	Goa: Cultural Trends: Seminar Papers	Goa, Daman and Diu (India)	Directorate of Archives, Archaeology and Museum, Government of Goa
1988	Goa's Struggle for Freedom	India	Ajanta Publications
1989	Āṭhavaṇī mājhyā kārāvāsācyā kāḷyā-niḷyā pānyācyā	Paṇājī	Gomantaka Marāṭhī Akādamī
1990	Who's Who of Freedom Fighters, Goa, Daman, and Diu, Volume 2	Goa, Daman and Diu (India)	Goa Gazetteer Dept., Government of Goa
1991	Trial of T.B. Cunha	Goa	Goa Gazetteer Dept., Government of Goa
1992	Goa's External Relations: Seminar Papers	Goa	Directorate of Archives, Archaeology, and Museum, Goa University
1992	Trial of Laxmikant Venkatesh Prabhu Bhembre	Panaji, Goa	Goa Gazetteer Dept., Government of Goa
1993	Trial of Rama Krishna Hegde	Goa	Goa Gazetteer Dept., Government of Goa
1993	Source Material for the History of the Freedom Movement of Goa: Collected from Goa Archives, Volume 3	Goa	Goa Gazetteer Dept., Goa Archives
1993	People of India: Goa	India	Anthropological Survey of India
1996	Trial of P.K. Kakodkar: Source Material for the History of The Freedom Movement of Goa (Collected from Goa Archives), Volume 5	Goa	Goa Gazetteer Dept., Government of Goa
1997	Portuguese Palaeography	Goa, India	Mrs. Sulabha P. Shirodka
1998	Researches in Indo-Portuguese history, Volumes 1 and 2	Jaipur	Publication Scheme
1999	Trial of the Four: Pandurang P. Shirodkar, Dr. Vinayak N. Mayenkar, Guilherme de Souza Ticló, Nilkanth M. Karapurkar''	Goa	Goa Gazetteer Dept., Goa Archives
2001	Gomantakācī Marāṭhī asmitā	Paṇajī	Gomantaka Marāṭhī Akādamī
2005	Honorable Jagannath Shankarshet	Goa	Pradnya-Darshan Prakashan
2012	World War II: Blazing Midnight: German Remote Control at Marmagoa Silenced	Bardez, Goa	Pradnya-Darshan Prakashan
