= Gopakapattana =

Gopakapattana or Gopakpatna (also known as Govāpurī, Gopakapurī in Sanskrit, Goy in Konkani, Govā in Marathi, Gove in Kannada) was a prosperous ancient port city in the present west coastal Indian state of Goa, that served as capital under the reign of different Hindu dynasties extending from 100 BC to 1469 AD which ruled ancient Goa (which included Modern Goa and South Konkan).

In a certain Hindu scripture Suta Samhita, Govapuri is associated with spiritually cleansing touch: ...The very sight of Govapuri destroys any sin committed in former existence just as sunrise dispels darkness ...Certainly there is no other kshetra equal to Govapuri

A similar hymn praising Govapuri city is found in Sahyadrikhanda of Skanda Purana, which says the extent of Govapuri was about seven Yojanas.

गोकर्णादुत्तरे भागे सप्तयोजनविस्तृतं
तत्र गोवापुरी नाम नगरी पापनाशिनी

Gopakapattana is today a sleepy blink-and-miss village of Tiswadi. What may appear like just any other Goan roadside village, strewn across the paddy fields barely 10km from Panaji was, until the emergence of Ela or today's Old Goa.

Goa Velha literally means Old Goa. This is often the reason for the village being confused for the other historically rich village of Old Goa or Velha Goa which was then still nascent.

Gopakapattana is said to be built by Sanapulla, the founder of the south Konkan Silahara dynasty, who reigned from 765 AD. The Silaharas ruled from 765 AD to 1020 AD, when they were overthrown by the Kadambas.

According to the historian Dr A S Altekar, Gopakapattana finds mention in the epic, Mahabharata. It was also known as Govapuri or Gove in the Ramayana, which adds that whoever casts a glance over the holy city of Govapuri gets his sins cleansed.

As the Kadamba dynasty prospered, they built a navy that was formidable. With Chandor being too small to accommodate his fleet of ships, Kadamba ruler Jayakeshi I moved to Goa Velha or Gopakapattana which had natural breakwaters, a safe cove and was open to the seas, historians recount.

Today, all that remains of that historic city are the ruins of the laterite brick wall of the ancient port, the site of the Kadamba palace, the 8km-long royal passage known as Raj Bidd from Agasaim to Old Goa, and some centuries-old water tanks.

A predominantly Catholic village, Goa Velha is marked by many crosses and chapels besides the striking church of St Andrew.

The village also holds a special significance for the Hindu brethren. Chamunda Devi is worshipped as the gramdevi or village goddess and this is seen in the number of stores that are named after the deity. While the main temple dedicated to Chamunda Devi is at Bicholim, a small idol of the goddess remains housed in the Zuwarkar family home for daily dharshan.

On Akshaya tritiya, the deity kept in the Zuwarkar household is put on an assembled palki (palanquin) and taken in a procession to the building of the Marathi school of the Chemunda Samaj in Goa Velha. It is followed by a three-day cultural programme.

The 350-year old home of the Zuwarkar's commands a note. It is said that the surname Zuwarkar originates from this village.

Today, the vestiges of Goa Velha are fading away. Once famed for its sweet potatoes and saltpans, traditional trade is dying out. With 65% of its population, especially the younger generation, trading in their Indian passports for the sought-after Portuguese passport, the identity of the village is changing, says Dr Carmo Pegado.

In the past, Goa Velha was noted for Ayurveda. In fact, one of the village wards, Zuari, comprised mostly experts in Ayurvedic medicines and the treatment of broken bones and hence they were known as Zuarioilo doctor. Not much is left of this trade today.

== See also ==
- Kadambas of Goa
- History of Goa
- Saptakoteshwar
