= Usgalimal rock engravings =

Prehistoric site in Western India

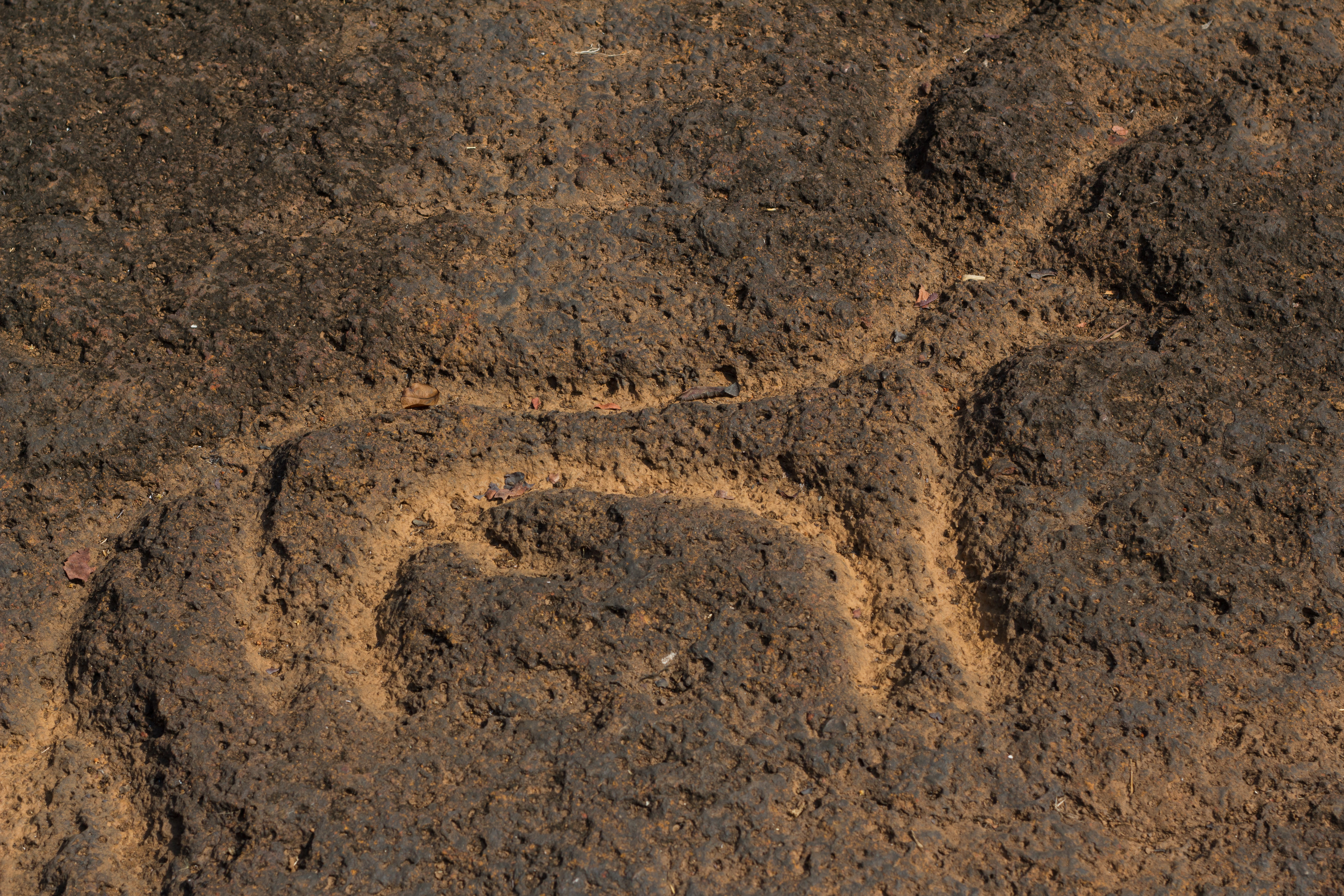
- Interactive map of Usgalimal rock engravings
- 15.1219°N 74.1306°E
- Type: Rock art
- Location: Goa, India

History
- Built: c. 3000 BC

Site notes
- Discovered: 1993

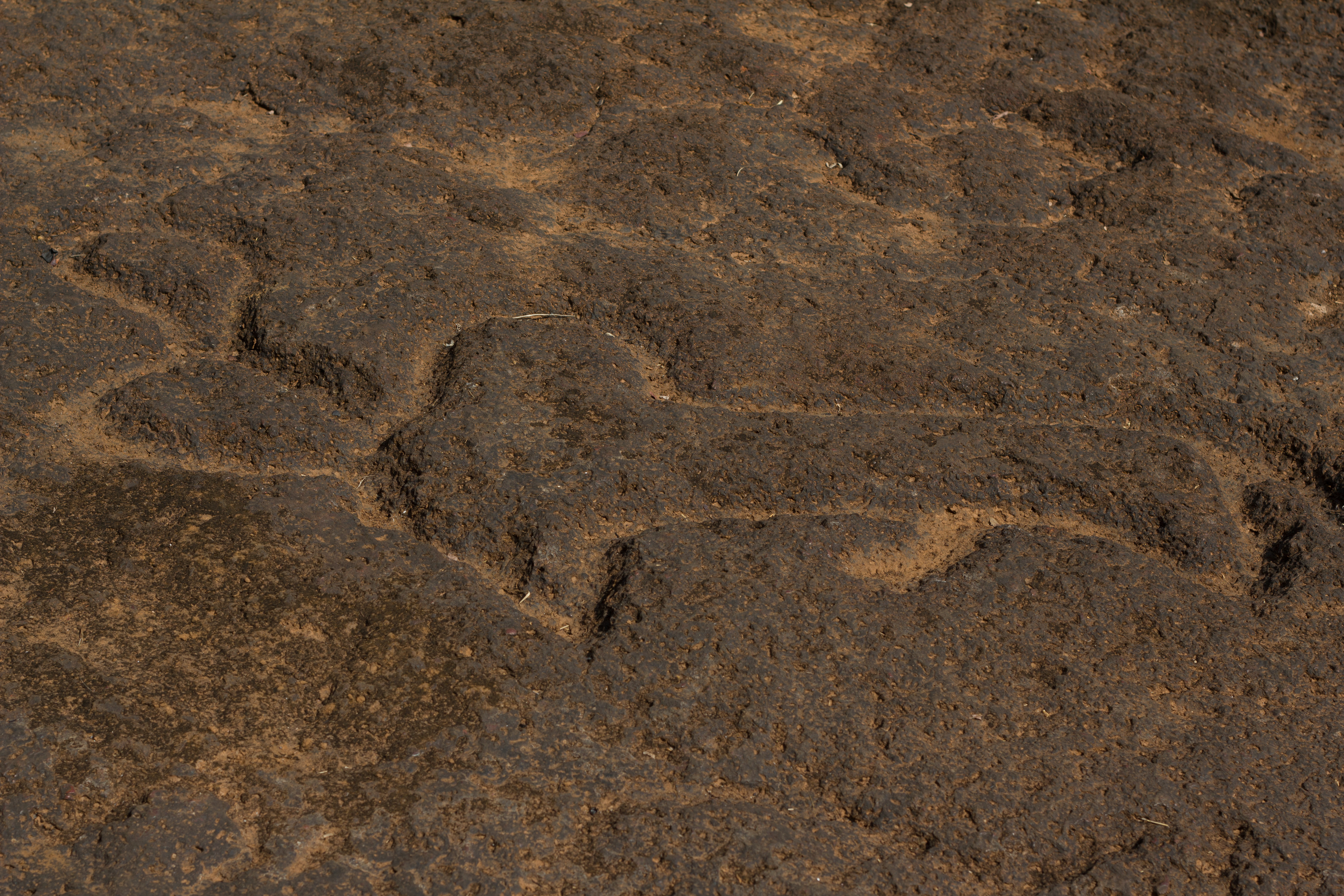
Petroglyph depicting an Indian bison

The Usgalimal rock engravings or Usgalimal petroglyphs at Usgalimal village, in South Goa, is one of the most important prehistoric sites in Western India.

== Overview ==
Situated on the banks of river Kushavati, these engravings exhibit earliest traces of human settlement in Goa. These petroglyphs (rock art) are approximately 4,000 to 6,000 years old and belong to the Neolithic Period. More than 100 distinct figures, spread an area of 500 sqm., including images of bulls, labyrinths and human figures are carved on laterite stones.

The site was discovered in 1993 when local villagers took archaeologists to the bend in west-flowing river Kushavati outside the village, with mysterious engravings on the laterite shelf. The layer of mud covering up the engravings had been washed away by monsoon floods facilitating their discovery. Subsequently, when the soil was cleared more engravings were found. In the coming years, the Archaeological Survey of India (ASI) put up signage and started promoting the site as a tourist destination, while the Forest Department declared it a protected area. Some of the finds are displayed in the Panaji Archaeological Museum.

== Location ==
The engravings are situated on the bed of the river Kushavati, beyond old iron ore mines, outside Usagalimal village, accessible via a winding pathway. It is about one km down from the main road between Rivona to Neturlim, and about 16 km south of Rivona in the Sanguem taluka in South Goa district.
