= Pandurang Purushottam Shirodkar =

Indian activist and politician (1916–2000)

Speaker of the Goa, Daman and Diu Legislative Assembly
- In office 1964–1967
- Preceded by: office established
- Succeeded by: Gopal Kamat

Member of the Goa Legislative Assembly
- In office 1963–1967
- Preceded by: constituency established
- Succeeded by: Punaji Achrekar
- Constituency: Siolim

Personal details
- Born: 12 October 1916 Mapuçá, Goa, Portuguese India
- Died: 3 September 2000 (aged 83)
- Party: Janata Party
- Other political affiliations: Maharashtrawadi Gomantak Party; Lok Dal
- Children: 4, including Prakashchandra Pandurang Shirodkar

Pandurang Purushottam Shirodkar (Marathi: Pa. Pu. Shirodkar; 12 October 1916 – 3 September 2000), better known by his pen name P. P. Shirodkar, was an Indian independence activist, author, and politician who was the first Speaker of the Goa, Daman and Diu Legislative Assembly. Born in Mapuçá, Goa, he played a significant role in the Goan independence movement, enduring long periods of imprisonment and exile in Africa and Portugal. He was also a noted lawyer and journalist who worked for publications such as the Navshakti.

== Early life and education ==
Shirodkar was born on 12 October 1916 in Mapusa, Portuguese India, to Dwarkibai and Purushottam Kamu Shirodkar. He received his primary education in the Marathi medium. He later attended a lyceum where he completed his seventh year of Portuguese studies before obtaining a diploma in Portuguese law. Following his education, he established himself as a prominent lawyer.

== Independence activism and career ==
Shirodkar began participating in the Goan independence movement in 1939. Since that year, he would openly hoist the Indian tricolour at Velha Goa every Republic Day of India. He was a founding member and subsequently the President of the National Congress (Goa) Executive Committee. During this period, he maintained contact with Indian independence activists such as Senapati Bapat in Bombay Presidency, reportedly supplying him with weaponry. In the 1940s, he was involved in stealing arms and ammunition from Portuguese storehouses and supplying them to nationalists. After a failed raid on supplies stored at Tambdi Mati, which resulted in the arrest of some associates, Shirodkar moved to Poona, British India.

He served as the deputy editor of the newspaper Sakal in Poona before moving to Bombay, where he worked as a news editor for the daily Navshakti. During his time in Bombay, he wrote research articles focusing on Goan history and annexation. He also served as the Marathi-Portuguese co-editor of the periodical Aavese and was active on the executive committee of the Goa Youth League. Furthermore, he held the position of Secretary for both the Congress Socialist Party and the Samyukta Maharashtra Parishad (United Maharashtra Council).

To dedicate himself fully to the independence movement, Shirodkar resigned from his career in journalism and resumed activities with the National Congress (Goa). The Portuguese authorities arrested him on 25 September 1946, sentencing him to four months in Fort Aguada. During this incarceration, he undertook a 14-day hunger strike to demand treatment as a satyagrahi. Upon his release, he organized a session of the Goan Congress at Carambolim on 15 May 1947, where the organization adopted a constitution and passed resolutions demanding full independence and integration with India. While in prison, he translated Lokmanya Tilak's monumental work Shrimad Bhagavad Gita Rahasya into Portuguese. This was published in 2016.

== Exile in Portuguese Angola ==
Following his re-arrest on 16 December 1947, Shirodkar was tried by a Territorial Military Tribunal (TMT) and sentenced to 15 years in exile along with associates including Vinayak Mayenkar, Guilherme de Souza Ticlo, and Nilkanth Karapurkar. He was deported to Portuguese Angola, where he was detained at Fort Roçadas. He later spent time in Sá da Bandeira (now Lubango) between 1 June 1952 and 12 May 1956. Although eventually released from strict confinement, he was forced to remain in exile within Angola. To make a living, he conducted private tuition classes and worked as a journalist.

Due to his participation in local political movements and the Angolan War of Independence, he was imprisoned again. The Portuguese authorities termed him a "mentor" of the nationalist movement in Angola and arrested him on 6 February 1961. He was held in solitary confinement at the Sao Paulo prison in Luanda for five months. During his exile, he also served as a co-editor for the Jornal de Angola in Luanda.

Despite his imprisonment, Shirodkar held a deep affection for the country, stating in his autobiography, Athwani Mhazhya Karavasachya Kalya Nilya Pannyacha, "The people of Angola are so wonderful. If there is such a thing as rebirth, I would want to be reborn in Angola."

After nearly 15 years of imprisonment and exile, Shirodkar was sent to Lisbon. He eventually returned to India via Karachi, arriving in May 1962, six months after the annexation of Goa.

== Post-liberation of Goa ==
In 1963, Shirodkar became the vice-president of the Maharashtrawadi Gomantak Party (MGP). He successfully contested the 1964 general elections from the Shivole constituency. Following his election, he was chosen unopposed as the first Speaker of the Goa, Daman and Diu Legislative Assembly.

Later in his career, he left the MGP to join the Lok Dal, serving as its president, and subsequently became the Vice-President of the Janata Party in Goa.

== Literary works ==
Shirodkar was a strong advocate for the Marathi language and served as the Chairman of the Marathi State Language Establishment Committee. He was also an honorary fellow of the Gomantak Marathi Academy. While incarcerated in Angola, he translated Bal Gangadhar Tilak's Shrimad Bhagavad Gita Rahasya into the Portuguese language.

The manuscript remained unpublished for decades until his four children, including historian Prakashchandra Pandurang Shirodkar, funded its publication. It was released by the Xavier Centre of Historical Research in October 2016 to mark his birth centenary.

His literary works include books in Marathi, Konkani, English, and Portuguese. Notable works include:

- Bhartiya Samajvighatak Jativarna Visvastha (Marathi) – Winner of the Goa Kala Academy Award.
- Itihasachya Drishtikonatun Gomantakatil Marathi Paramparacha Udgam va Vikas (Marathi).
- Athwani Mhazhya Karavasachya Kalya Nilya Pannyacha (Marathi) – An autobiography detailed his time in Angola.

== Awards and accolades ==
In recognition of his contributions to the freedom struggle, the Government of India awarded him the Tamra Patra in 1973. The Government of Goa honored him on 18 June (Goa Revolution Day). Additionally, he was conferred the title of 'Rashtraveer' at the 13th session of the All India Freedom Fighters Committee in Sarnath. The Government of India also recognised his contributions to a book on the origin and development of Marathi language.
