= British rule in Portuguese India =

British occupation of Portuguese India Goa britânica
- 1797 to 1798; 1799 to 1813
- Flag

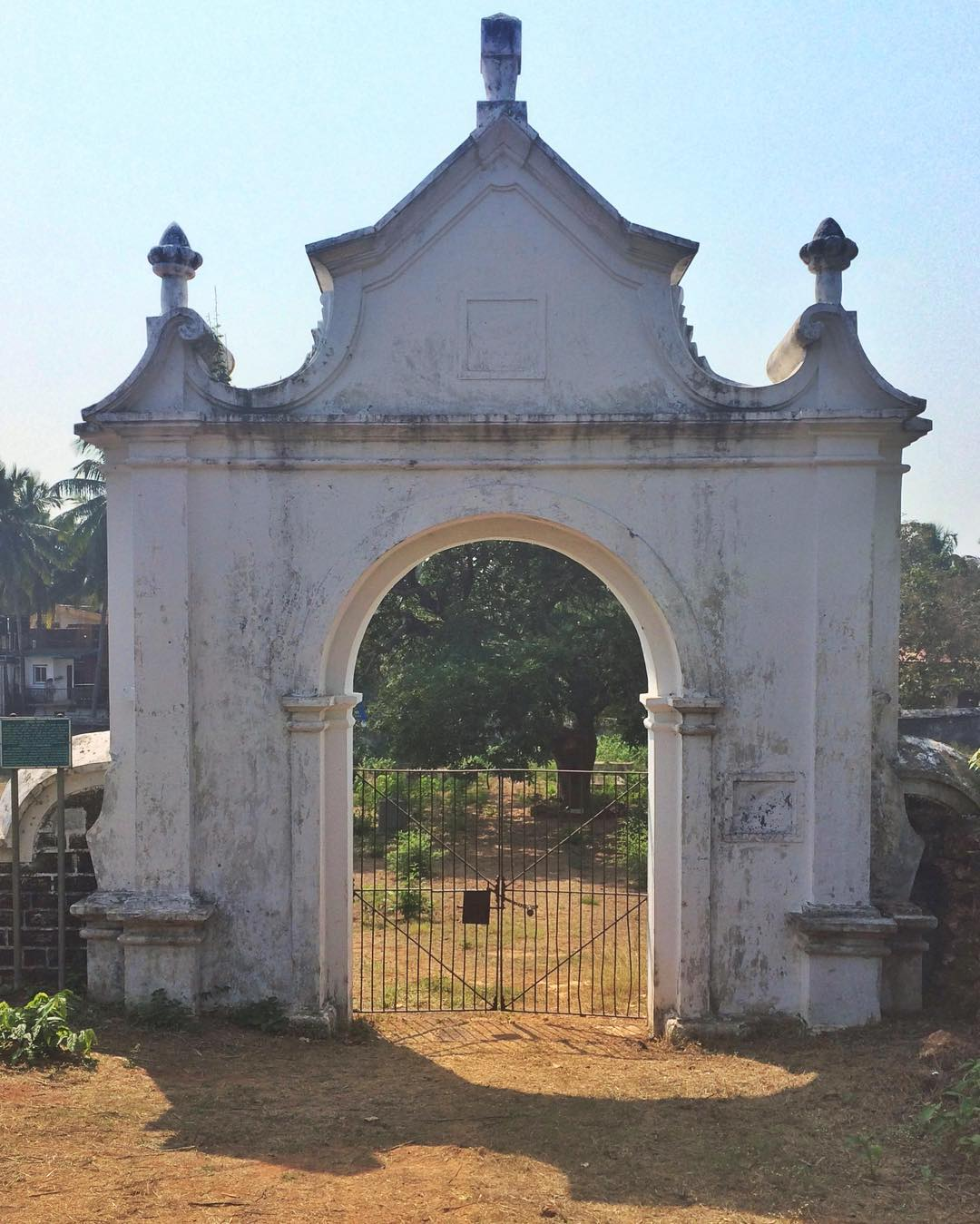
- A British Cemetery is the only remnant of this era
- Status: Protectorate of the British Empire
- Capital: Palacio do Cabo in Pangim
- Official languages: European Portuguese and British English
- Common languages: Konkani, Marathi, Gujarati& Indo-Portuguese
- Religion: Roman Catholicism
- Historical era: Colonial Era
  - Anglo-Portuguese Treaty: 16 Jun 1373
  - Portugal joins the Second Coalition: 01 Jun 1798
  - Defeat of Portugal: 09 Jun 1801
  - First defeat of Napoléon: 19 Oct 1813

Area
  - Total: 4,305 km^{2} (1,662 sq mi)
- Currency: Portuguese real
Preceded by	Succeeded by
Portuguese India	Portuguese India
- Today part of: India

Goa, Daman and Diu (Portuguese: Goa, Damaon & Dio) were one of Portugal's oldest colonies, acquired in 1510 AD or the next few years. During the Napoleonic Wars, the Portuguese were concerned at being unable to defend their empire from the predatory French or her allied navies. Due to the historic Anglo-Portuguese Alliance, British India was keen to assist in Goa's security. Britain dispatched a Royal Navy squadron as well as an army of 10,000 soldiers. The British soldiers were posted at strategic locations like Aguada, Miramar, Caranzalem, Palacio do Cabo and Morumugão. The soldiers built huge fortifications in these areas to help defend them. (These fortifications were subsequently demolished after the British departed.) This amicable agreement ended in 1813, thanks largely to the massive defeat of the French and Spanish fleets at Trafalgar in 1805. There are two distinct phases of the period, from 1797 to 1798 and from 1802 to 1813 (in 1814 Napoleon was exiled to the island of Elba). For the next century, no country was capable of challenging the power of the Royal Navy. Goa could benefit from Pax Britannica.

During this time, the Portuguese were still in charge of the administration of the territory (the local government was headed by the Viscount of Mirandela from 1794 to 1806, then by the Count of Sarzedas from 1806 to 1816).

== British cemetery ==
A military cemetery is the only evidence of the presence of British forces in Goa that was otherwise ruled by the Portuguese. There are a total of 108 tombs, the oldest of them dates to 1808 and the latest of them dates to 1912.
