= Kushavati =

Ancient Indian city named in the Ramayana

Kushavati was a city in Kosala Kingdom as per epic Ramayana. The king of Kosala Lord Rama installed his son Lava at Sravasti on the northern part of the kingdom and Kusha at Kushavati in the south. It was located on the slopes of the Vindhya Range.

== Names ==
Kushavati is the name of:

- A town named Kushavati in Karnataka state near Sharavati river.
- A river in Goa, West India.
- A district in Goa- Kushavati district
