= List of Konkani Poets =

This is a list of Indian Poets in Konkani who write in the diverse scripts used for this language.

- Arun Sakhardande
- B. B. Borkar
- C. F. D'Costa
- J. B. Moraes
- J. B. Seqeira
- Jess Fernandez
- K. Ananth Bhat
- Krishnambhat Bandkar (1876-1945)
- Madhav Borcar
- Dr. Manohar Rai Sardesai
- Melvyn Rodrigues
- Melvyn Rodrigus
- Nagesh Karmali
- Pandurang Bhangi
- PN Sivananda Shenoy
- Prakash Padgaoncar
- R. V. Pandit
- R.S.Bhaskar
- Ramesh Veluskar
- Sankar Ramani
- Saratchandra Shenoi
- Sudesh Lotlikar
