= Shenoy =

Surname list

Shenoy is a Konkani surname from coastal Karnataka and Goa in India. It is found among Hindus of the Goud Saraswat Brahmin community following Smartha Sampradaya of Kavale Matha or Madhva Sampradaya of either Gokarna Matha or Kashi Matha.

The name is also in use among some Brahmin Christian families of South Canara who trace their ancestry to the Goud Saraswat Brahmins of Karnataka, Kerala and Goa.

== Etymology ==
श्रेणीपति > शेणीव्वई > शेणय

There are two theories about the origin of Shenoy or Shenvi.

1. The Sanskrit word Shrenipati, meaning the leader of the guild, which got converted as Shennivayi in Apabhraṃśa, and later as Shenai or Shenvi in old Konkani.
2. It is from the Sanskrit word for 96, ṣaṇṇavati (षण्णवति). The significance of the word 96 among Konkanis is that 96 villages formed the core region of Goa. It is said that 96 clans / families of Saraswat Brahmins arrived in Gomantak and settled in one village each. 66 villages were in Sashti region (66 in Sanskrit is ṣaṭ ṣaṣṭi - षट् षष्टि. Sashti became Salcette during the Portuguese rule) and 30 villages were in Tiswadi region.

== Background and origins ==
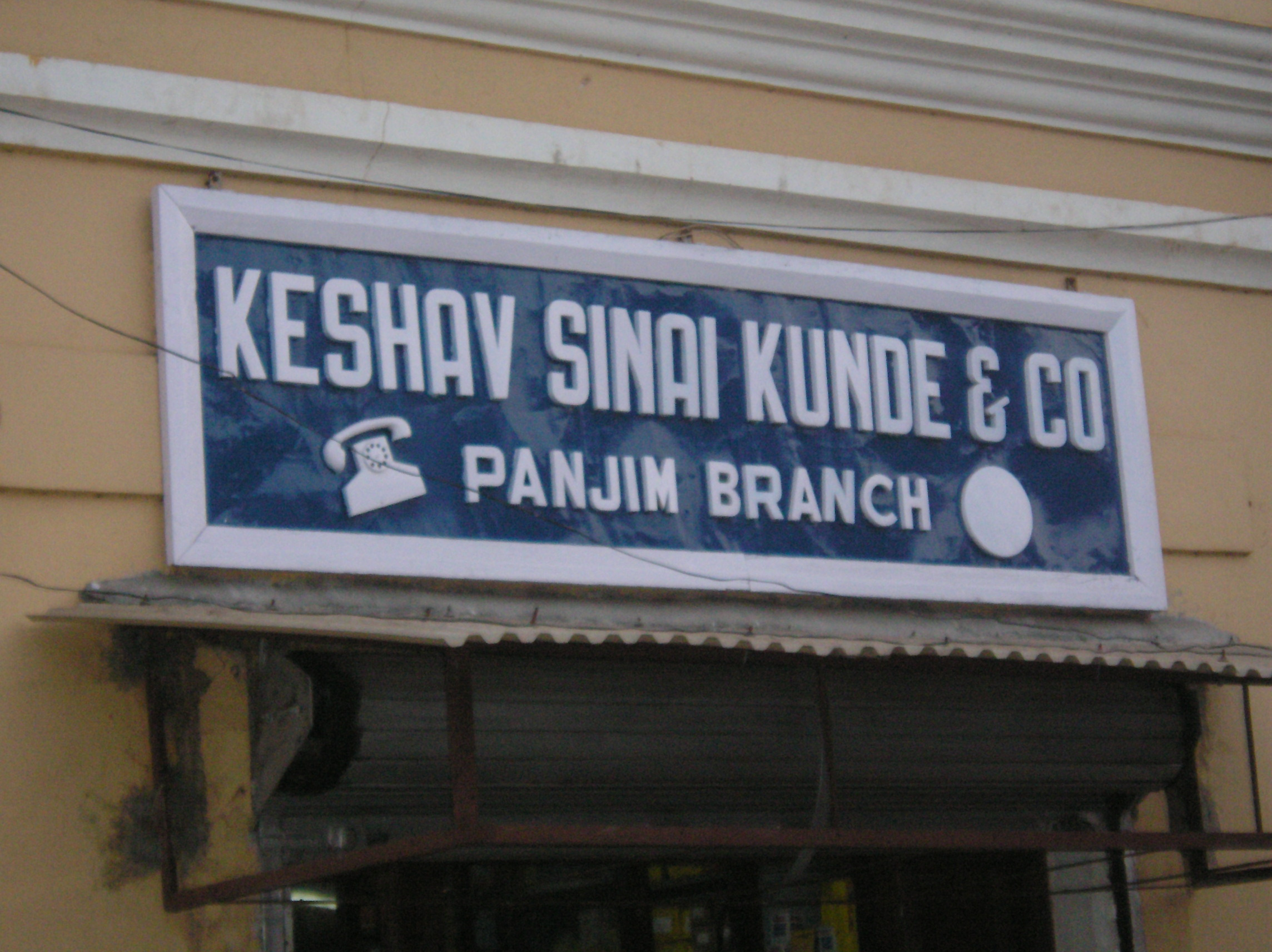
Plaque outside a commercial establishment, Goa, India

The Shenoys were generally involved in administration of the city and temples. The word 'Shenoy' itself means a writer or accountant. GSBs were administrators of the temples. The word 'Shenoy' is also interchangeable with its counterpart 'Shanbhag'.

The Saraswats migrated from Goa during the Muslim and Christian conquests during 1600, and carried their surname with them. Shenoy is derived from old Konkani word šeṇəy. Thus the word 'शणै' is transliterated in Latin script as Shenoy in Karnataka and as Xennai, Shenoi, Shenai, Shenvi or even Sinai in Goa. Xennoi is less commonly used in the erstwhile Portuguese Goa and Damaon, but nowadays it has given way to Xennai today.

It was common in Goa for Shenoys and other Saraswats to add the name of their ancestral village or title after Shenoy to denote their origin.

== Notable people ==
- Arun Shenoy: Indian-Singaporean composer and music producer who has received a Grammy Award nomination
- Basti Vaman Shenoy: Konkani activist and founder of World Konkani Centre in Mangalore
- Chitra Shenoy: South Indian TV and movie actress
- Krishna V. Shenoy: Hong Seh and Vivian W.M. Lim Professor in the School of Engineering, Stanford University
- Madhav Manjunath Shanbhag: Indian lawyer and activist on behalf of the Konkani people
- Nakul Shenoy: Indian mentalist, mind reader, and psychic entertainer
- Prashant Shenoy: Distinguished Professor of Computer Science at the University of Massachusetts Amherst, Co-Founder and CTO at UniCourt
- Prathima Devi: Kannada actress, wife of D. Shankar Singh, mother of Rajendra Singh Babu
- Preeti Shenoy: Indian author, speaker and illustrator
- Samskruthy Shenoy: Malayalam TV and cinema actress
- Shenoi Goembab (1877–1946): Konkani Pandit
- Suresh V. Shenoy: Indian-American engineer, senior business executive and philanthropist
- T. V. R. Shenoy: Journalist, editor, and columnist
- T. S. Shanbhag: Owner of Bangalore's famous Premier Book Shop
- Vandana Shanbhag: Indian former track and field athlete who represented India at the 1988 Olympics in the 4 x 400 metres relay race
- Vasudev V Shenoy (1940 – 2015): Educationist, Educational Counsellor, Journalist and a Social Activist
- Vijay Balakrishna Shenoy: Professor of physics and recipient of the Shanti Swarup Bhatnagar Prize, the highest science award in India
- Vivek Shanbhag Indian story writer, novelist and playwright in Kannada

== See also ==
- List of Saraswats
- Saraswat Brahmins
- Gaud Saraswat Brahmin
