= CHA =

CHA or Cha may refer to:

== Sports ==
- Canadian Hockey Association (disambiguation)
- College Hockey America, the NCAA Division I conference
- College Hockey Association, the ACHA Division II conference
- Continental Hockey Association
- Charlotte Hornets, a basketball team
- Carver–Hawkeye Arena, Iowa City, Iowa

== Education and healthcare ==
- Chestnut Hill Academy, Philadelphia, Pennsylvania
- CHA University
- Cambridge Health Alliance, a teaching hospital of Harvard Medical School
- Catholic Health Association of the United States

== Places ==
- Chah (Cameroon), a village affected by the Lake Nyos gas eruption
- Chad (ISO and FIFA country code: CHA), a landlocked country in Central Africa
- Chattanooga Metropolitan Airport (IATA airport code: CHA), an airport in Chattanooga, Tennessee
- Charlotte, North Carolina

== Language ==
- Che (Cyrillic) (Ч), a letter of the Cyrillic alphabet
- Kha (Cyrillic) (Х), a letter of the Cyrillic alphabet
- Cha (Armenian letter)
- Chamorro language, ISO 639-2 code
- Cha (Indic), a glyph in the Brahmic family of scripts

== Astronomy ==
- Chamaeleon (constellation)
- Circumhorizontal arc, an atmospheric optical phenomenon
- Circumhorizon arc

== People ==
- Cha (Chinese surname)
- Cha (Korean surname)
- Cha (name)
- Cha., an abbreviation of the name Charles

== Government and politics ==
- Canadian Heraldic Authority, part of the Canadian honours system
- Chicago Housing Authority
- Chunta Aragonesista (Aragonese Council), a political party of Aragon, Spain
- United States House Committee on House Administration, a U.S. federal government committee deals with the general administration matters of the United States House of Representatives
- Cultural Heritage Administration, an agency of the South Korean government
- Customs house agent, a licensed agent for transactions at any Customs station

== Other uses ==
- Cha (album), a 1982 album by Jo Jo Zep
- Canadian Heritage Alliance
- Canadian Historical Association
- Cha: An Asian Literary Journal, Hong Kong–based online English literary journal
- China Telecom (NYSE: CHA)
- Chả, a type of Vietnamese sausage
- Certified Hotel Administrator, a certification from the American Hotel & Lodging Educational Institute

== See also ==
- Cha-cha-chá (music)
