= All India Konkani Parishad =

The All India Konkani Parishad is a national conference held in India. It is meant to support the Konkani people and Konkani language, and conducts various activities to achieve that goal, aided by local authorities.

== History ==
The Konkani Parishad was launched when India's struggle for freedom was at its peak. The organization was founded on July 8, 1939 by the late Madhav Manjunath Shanbhague of Kumta—then under the Bombay Presidency, now in Karnataka. It shifted to Goa, the homeland of Konkani, in 1961 when the territory was liberated from Portuguese rulers. At present, it functions from Goa as the national apex body to which 16 regional/local associations are affiliated and works for the development of Konkani language, literature, culture, education, etc. across the country.

The Konkani Parishad had set the following objectives before it in 1939

- To bring about unity among the Konkani speaking people of various regions
- To remove indifference of Konkanis towards their mother tongue and promote their love for the language
- To strive for standardisation of the Konkani language
- To promote use of Devanagari as the natural, common script for Konkani
- To work for the development and spread of Konkani literature and culture.

During the past 75 years, the Parishad relentlessly worked, mostly through its national conferences for achieving its objectives. It has so far organized 29 biennial sessions and 22 biennial Konkani literary Conferences apart from innumerable other programmes at the national level.

These conferences were always graced by linguists like Dr. Suniti Kumar Chatterjee and Dr. S.M. Katre, and intellectuals like Kakasaheb Kalelkar and prominent litterateurs of various languages of the country.

The Parishad has always been in the forefront in fighting for the issues daunting the Konkani language. It identified and deliberated on the various problems related to the development of the language and prepared strategies for solving them. The following resolutions passed during the conferences throw light on the various issues agitating the minds of the Konkanies from time to time.

1. Inclusion of Konkani programmes in all India Radio and Doordarshan
2. Introduction of Konkani in school and college education and preparation of Konkani textbooks
3. Making Konkani available books in public libraries
4. Establishment of Konkani Bhasha Mandals in various states
5. Getting advertisements for Konkani periodicals
6. Recognition of the language by Sahitya Akademi, New Delhi
7. Inclusion of Konkani in the 8th schedule of the country's constitution
8. Official language status for Konkani in Goa
9. Statehood for Goa
10. Establishment of state academies for Konkani in Goa, Karnataka, Kerala and Maharashtra

These resolutions were persistently followed up and, by and large, their purposes were achieved. The major issues which exercised the minds of the people at the Parishad's meets were satisfactorily settled when Konkani was recognised as an independent language by Sahitya Akademi, New Delhi in 1976 and the language attained the status of official language in Goa in 1987. The crowning glory came when Konkani was included in the 8th Schedule of the country's constitution in 1992.

These landmarks in the history of Konkani language were followed by establishment of Konkani Academies in Goa, Karnataka and recently in Kerala. The progress achieved in teaching Konkani from primary school level to post-graduate level in the colleges and its increased use in administration and mass media is also due to the direct and indirect efforts of the Parishad.

== Sessions ==
Brief details of the sessions of the Parishad are as below:

Adhiveshan	dates	Reception Committee Chairman	President	Inaugurated
First Adhiveshan				The first session of the Parishad was held on 8 and 9 July 1939, Karwar. The conference was organised under the leadership of late Madhav Manjath Shanbhag, a leading advocate of Karwar. It was presided over by Vishwanath Pandurang Prabhu
Second Adhiveshan	31, December, 1940, Udupi	T. M. A. Pai	Mr. Jerome Saldanha	
Third Adhiveshan	4,5, April, 1942, Mumbai	Mr. Vaman Raghunath Varde Valavalikar aka Shenoi Goembab	Prof. Armando Menezes, Academician & English poet	
Fourth Adhiveshan	1949, Mumbai		Dr. Mafaldo Ubaldo Mascarenhas	Anandashram Swami
Fifth Adhiveshan	23,24 February 1952 Mumbai		Dr. Mariano Saldanha, a scholar of international repute (He was teaching Sanskrit in Portugal)	Rt. Rev. Valerian Cardinal Gracias, India's first Cardinal
Sixth Adhiveshan	27,28 April 1957 Mumbai		Dr.Sumitra Mangesh Katre, Renowned linguist	Acharya Kaka Kalelkar Gandhian Intellectual & Eminent Gujarati writer
Seventh Adhiveshan	16, May, 1960, Karwar		Dr. B.A.Saletore, Noted Historian	Shrimat Dwarakanatha Teertha (Gokarna Partagali Math)
Eighth Adhiveshan	26,27 May 1962, Madgaon (First Adhiveshan in Liberated Goa)		Dr.Manohar Rai Sardesai, Eminent Konkani Poet	Violet Alva, Vice President, Rajyasabha, Indian Parliament
Ninth Adhiveshan	29,30 September 1967, Mumbai		Bakibab Borkar, Eminent Konkani Poet	Vasantrao Naik Chief Minister of Maharashtra
10th Adhiveshan	9,10 February 1974 Panaji		K.K.Pai, Chairman & MD, Syndicate Bank	Dr. Suniti Kumar Chatterji, President Sahitya Akademi
11th Adhiveshan	21,22 February 1976, Mangalore	K.K.Pai	Chandrakant Keni, Eminent Konkani Writer	
12th Adhiveshan	12. 12th Adhiveshan - 11,12, February, Kochi		Ravindra Kelekar, Eminent Konkani Writer & Jnanpeeth Award winner	A. K. Antony Chief Minister of Kerala
13th Adhiveshan	12,13 April 1980, Mumbai	F.A.Martiris	N. Purushotham Mallya, Scholar & Noted Writer	Pratapsingh Raoji Rane Chief Minister of Goa
14th Adhiveshan	27,28 February 1982, Panaji		V.J.P. Saldanha Eminent Konkani Novelist	Dr.Umashankar Joshi, President, Sahitya Akademi, New Delhi
15th Adhiveshan	11,12,13, May, 1984, Bangalore		Nagesh Sonde, Noted Konkani writer	A.N.Bannerji, Governor of Karnataka
16th Adhiveshan	24,25 May 1986, Kochi		Adv. Uday Bhembre Scholar & Eminent Konkani writer	M. Kamalam, Minister, Govt. of Kerala
17th Adhiveshan	6,7,8 January 1989, Manipal		M. V. Kamath, Renowned Author & Veteran journalist	Eduardo Faleiro Union Minister
18th Adhiveshan	14,15,16 December 1990, Ramnathi, Goa		Prof. R.K.Rao, Eminent Konkani author & Translator	Dr. José Pereira
19th Adhiveshan	16,17 January 1993, Madgaon, Goa	Dattaraj Salgaonkar	J. B. Moraes Eminent Konkani Poet	Ravi Naik, Chief Minister of Goa
20th Adhiveshan	11,12 February 1995, Shirsi, Karnataka		Dr. Kashinath Mahale, Academician & Scholar	R.V. Deshapande, Minister, Govt. Of Karnataka
21st Adhiveshan	18,19 January 1997, Mumbai		Dr. William Madtha, Linguist & Academician	
22nd Adhiveshan	15,16,17, January 1999, Belgaum		Pundalik Naik, Eminent writer	Umesh Katti, Minister, Govt. Of Karnataka
23rd Adhiveshan	20, 21, April, 2002, Mangalore		Dr. Tanaji Halarnkar, scholar, columnist and editor of Konkani Encyclopaedia	Ramanath Rai, Minister, Govt. of Karnataka
24th Adhiveshan	13,14,15 February 2004, Kozhikode		Basti Vaman Shenoy	Mr. Rajagopal, Union Minister for Railways
25th Adhiveshan	10,11,12 February 2006, Panaji, Goa		Mr. Paul Moras, Konkani writer	Inaugurated by Mr. S.C. Jamir, Governor of Goa
26th Adhiveshan	5,6.7 February 2008, Kochi, Kerala		Adv. Shantaram Naik (Member, Rajyasabha)	Inaugurated by Mr. K.K. Pai, President, Dr. T.M.A. Pai Foundation
27th Adhiveshan	5,6,7 February 2010, Sanquelim, Goa		Dr. H. Shantaram, Academician	Inaugurated by Mr. Ravindra Kelekar, Jnanpeeth Award-winning Konkani writer
28th Adhiveshan	17,18 February 2012, Mumbai		Mr.Arvind Bhatikar, IAS (Retd) Administrator & Author	Inaugurated: Mr. Ramdas Bhatkal
29th Adhiveshan	28 & 29 February, 1 March 2014, Belgaum, Karnataka		Mr. Gokuldas Prabhu Eminent Konkani Writer	Inaugurated by : Mr. R.V. Deshpande, Hon'ble Minister for Higher Education, Government of Karnataka

== See also ==
- Shenoi Goembab
- Madhav Manjunath Shanbhag
- World Konkani Hall Of Fame
