= Pandurang Phaldesai =

Indian author and folklorist

Pandurang Phaldesai is an Indian author and folklorist known for his writing and documentation about the traditional art forms and culture of Goa. He is the director of Thomas Stephens Konknni Kendr in Porvorim and has served as a Member Secretary of the Kala Academy for 35 years until his retirement.

== Career ==
Phaldesai's work mostly focuses on preservation of folk traditions. A research paper by scientist Nandkumar Kamat acknowledges Phaldesai for identifying 50 folklore forms. He has published a research paper on the "Perni Jagor" an endangered form of folk dance - drama. He has documented the history of a Century-old wooden masks used in this folk dance - music form. He received Sahitya Puraskar" for his research and documentation of folklore of Goa. Additionally, his book"Goemchya Lokvedachem Saundharyashastra" was selected for Dr. T M A Pai Best Konkani Book Award by T M A Foundation based at Manipal. As an expert on intangible heritage, he was appointed to a 15-member committee constituted by the Department of Archaeology for drafting of the Heritage Policy for the state of Goa.

He has edited the book "Temples of Goa - a spiritual odyssey" published by Konkani Bhas ani Sanskruti, World Konkani Centre.

== Books ==
- Folktales from New Goa, India
- Typological insights into folklore of Goa
- Folklore Studies - A ready reckoner
- Goemchya Lokvedachem Saundharyashastra

== Publications ==
Research paper on "Perni Jagor"
