= Sheila Khambadkone =

Sheila Keshav Khambadkone ( 11 February 1932 − 5 September 2011) was a noted Konkani poet, dramatist, and littérateuse. Her official name was Vijayalakshmi Keshav Khambadkone.

Sheila Khambadkone was born on 11 January 1932 in a Chitrapur Saraswat (Bhānap) family in Mangalore. She was the daughter of Ramrao Katre.

== Early life and education ==
Khambadkone lost her mother when she was three months old. Under the tutelage of her aunt Kilpady Sundaribai (Konkani: किल्पाडि सुंदरिबायि), who was a teacher and social worker, she did her schooling from Mangalore and matriculated (SSLC) in 1948. Her aunt was a major influence on her, drawing her towards literature. She shifted to Bombay in 1948 after the demise of her aunt. Khambadkone was married at 16 after which, under the active encouragement of her husband, she graduated in English literature and German.

== Literary career ==
Since her schooldays, Khambadkone wrote songs, poems and small skits. These were sung and read and enacted respectively with a small group of friends and neighbours. She used to write for the college magazine too. She has also read some of her poems on the Konkani section at the Mumbai station of All India Radio.

Khambadkone wrote two noteworthy dramas, a one-act play enacted at Santacruz Saraswat Colony, Mumbai in the Diwali of 1983 and a two-act play hās ājjē hās (Konkani: हास आज्जे हास) enacted in 1984 at the koṅkaṇi nāṭya mahōtsava. She also read her poems at the First World Konkani Convention (Konkani: पयलॆं विश्व कोंकणी संमेळन). In 2010, she compiled a book of her writings entitled khiso bhōṟnu hāso (Konkani: खिसॊ भोऱ्नु हासॊ).

In March 2008 Khambadkone received the lēkhana puraskār from the sārasvat mahilā samāj, Mumbai.

Khambadkone's genre was humour. She tried to bring out the nuances of the Konkani language. Being a speaker of the Bhanap dialect of Konkani, she was fascinated by the dialect of the Mangalorean Catholics in its usage of native Konkani words as against Tatsama words.
