= Ramesh Veluskar =

Indian poet and litterateur (1947–2018)

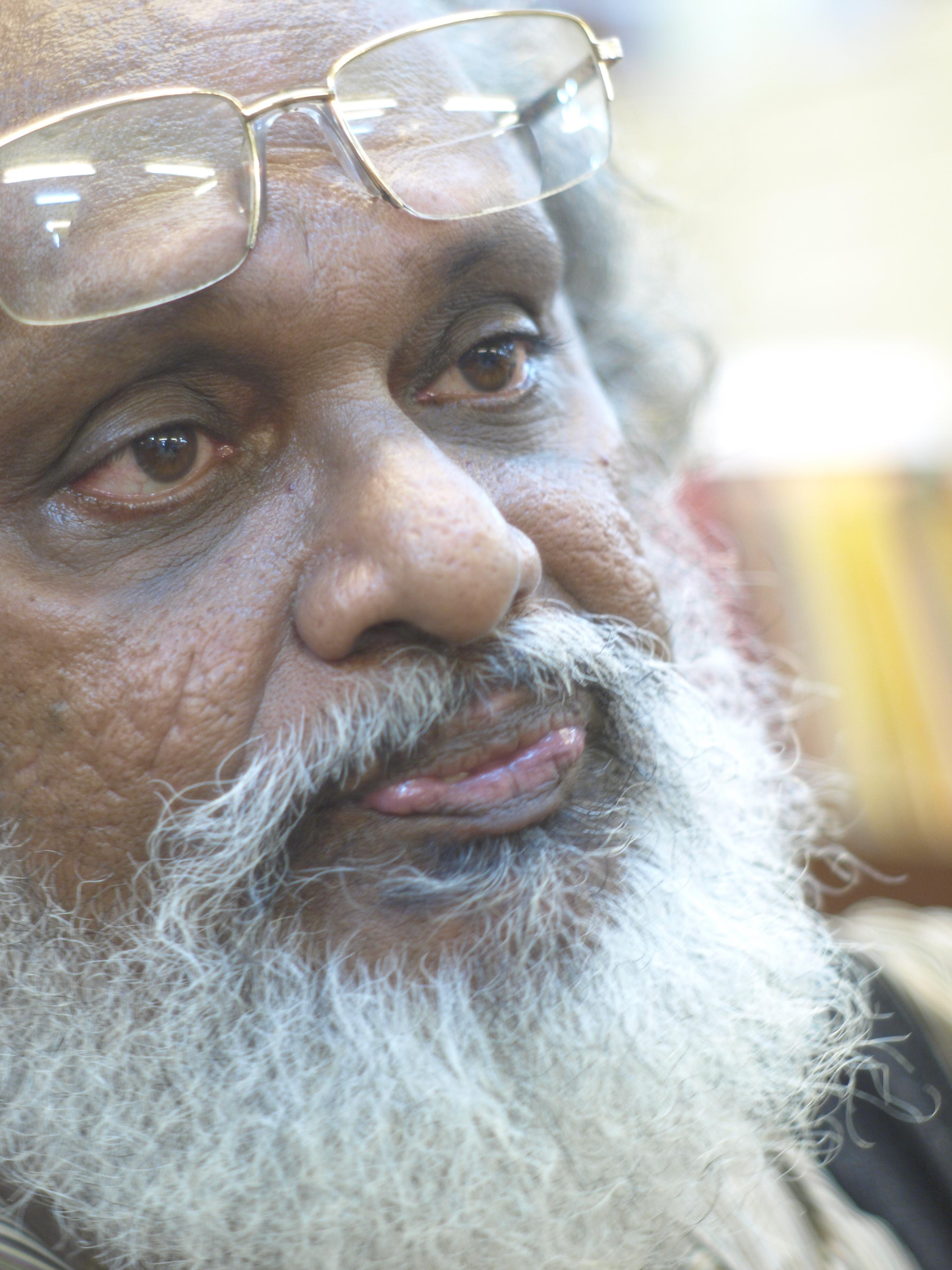
- Veluskar in 2011
- Born: 10 November 1947; Palem, Goa, Portuguese India, Portuguese Empire
- Died: 21 October 2018 (aged 70); Raebareli, Uttar Pradesh, India
- Occupations: Writer, poet, retired teacher
- Spouse: Mithilesh Srivasthava
- Children: 3
- Writing career
- Language: Konkani
- Notable awards: Rashtriya Hindi Seva Sahastrabdi Samman (2000), Sahitya Akademi award (1990), Kala Academi Puraskar (1983)

Ramesh Bhagvant Veluskar (10 November 1947 – 21 October 2018) was an Indian Konkani poet and litterateur. He died on 21 October 2018 at Raebareli, Uttar Pradesh.

== Background ==
Veluskar was a school teacher for 33 years, and has taught Konkani, Marathi and Hindi. Veluskar has written poetry, essays, novellas, and dramas for children.

While in Bhubaneswar to study Bengali in order to understand art appreciation in Delhi, he met the Uttar Pradesh-born Mithilesh Kumari Srivastava, whom he married in 1982. He has mastered Marathi, Konkani and Bengali languages.

== Interests, skills ==
He was trained in Indian classical vocals, does caricatures, and also acted in drama. Veluskar translated Sant Tukaram's abhangs and Rabindranath Tagore's Geetanjali to Konkani, and took the Portuguese poet Carlos Drumond de Andrade's works to Hindi readers.

== On his writing ==
In a video uploaded in 2010, scholar and writer Dr Nandkumar Kamat says of Veluskar: "Ramesh Bhagwant Veluskar is one of Goa's best known modern Konkani poet[s]. A Sahitya Akademi award winner, he has several Konkani and a Hindi poetry collection to his credit and is known as pioneer to introduce folklorical and mythological elements in Konkani and offer a new ecoerotic and ecoastehtic idiom."

Veluskar had "25 odd books to his credit, including translations from languages like Sanskrit, Hindi, Marathi and English", and some of his recent books include Zen Kavita and Pandurang Pandurang (2014). According to Bharati Pawaskar, writing in The Goan, "Wordsmiths like Manoharrai Sardesai, Ravindra Kelekar, Bakibab Borkar, Madhav Borkar, Dharmanand Kamat, R. V. Pandit, S S Nadkarni, Muralidhar Kulkarni, Nagesh Karmali, Evágrio Jorge encouraged Veluskar to write."

== Awards ==
His awards include the Kala Academy Puroskar for Moni Vyotha (1978–79), Konkani Bhasha Mandal Puroskar for Morpakham (1980), Konkani Bhasha Mandal Nehru Puroskar (1981) and Kala Academy Puroskar (1982–83) for Bhunk Bhunk Bhishu.

His first collection of Konkani poems, Morpakham, was published in 1979. He won the Indian Sahitya Akademi award for his 1989 collection of poems, Saulgori. Veluskar bagged the Non-Hindi Hindi Writer Award of the Government of India's Ministry of Human Resource Development for his poetry collection Samudramudrika in 2011.
