= Venkatesh Anant Pai Raikar =

Goan writer and translator (born 1912)

Venkatesh Anant Pai Raikar (1 March 1912 – unknown) was a Goan writer and translator known for his short stories and translations of Portuguese literature into Marathi.

== Early life and education ==
Venkatesh Anant Pai Raikar was born on 1 March 1912 in Savoi-Verem, Ponda, Goa. He received his primary education up to the sixth grade at home under the guidance of a private tutor. He subsequently moved to his maternal uncle's house in Cumbarjua to receive Portuguese education, after which he completed three years of Liceu schooling in Panaji.

== Literary career ==
Raikar began his writing career in 1932, publishing his debut short story in Lokamitra, a monthly journal based in Khanapur. His work was subsequently featured in periodicals such as Yashwant, Parijat, Dhruva, Chitramayajagat, and Kala.

In 1939, Raikar released his debut collection of short stories, titled Karanjache Tushar. His initial short fiction was characterized by simple prose, vivid characterization, a third-person narrative approach, and thematic harmony. Between 1940 and 1965, he published Saptaswara, a compilation containing seven short stories.

Romance (sringara) functioned as the central emotion in much of Raikar's fiction. In 1950, he authored a romance-driven novel titled Premvedi.

He wrote Bhavana ani Vasana after the Indian annexation of Goa.

=== Translations and reception ===
Raikar made a notable contribution to Marathi literature by translating Portuguese-language novels into Marathi. In 1942, he published Teen Taruni, a Marathi translation of a Portuguese novel. The original text featured unrestrained and explicit themes, which Raikar retained in his translation to highlight the original narrative's intensity. As a result of its candid handling of romance and passion, the book faced allegations of obscenity at the time of its publication.

== Selected works ==
Some selected works are:

- Karanjache Tushar (1939) – Short story collection
- Teen Taruni (1942) – Translation of a Portuguese novel
- Premvedi (1950) – Novel
- Saptaswara (1940–1965) – Short story collection
