= Laxmanrao Sardesai =

Indian poet and writer (1904–1986)

Laxmanrao Sardessai
- Born: 18 March 1904; Savoi-Verem, Goa, Portuguese India
- Died: 5 February 1986 (aged 81)
- Other name: Saimik
- Occupations: Poet; writer
- Movement: Goa liberation movement
- Children: Manohar Rai Sardesai (son)
- Relatives: Malbarao Sardesai
- Awards: Sahitya Akademi Award (1982)

Laxmanrao Sripad Suryarao Sardesai (18 March 1904 – 5 February 1986) was an Indian writer, freedom fighter, and educationist from Goa. A prolific writer in Marathi and Konkani, he was a recipient of the Sahitya Akademi Award. Sardesai played a significant role in the Goa liberation movement through both political activism and literary contributions.

== Early life and education ==
Sardesai was born on 18 March 1904 in Savoi-Verem. He received his primary education at his home in Savoi-Verem and at his grandfather's residence in Durbhat-wadi. He later moved to Panaji for further studies. In 1918, he passed the Sengudgrav examination. Over the next three years, he pursued private studies in the lyceum curriculum. He eventually completed the government lyceum letters course, passing the 7th year examination. During the same year, Sardesai obtained a diploma from the Istitur Commerciale.

== Career ==
=== Teaching ===
Sardesai began his professional life as a teacher, earning a reputation for his skills in the field. He established the Cullazio Indianu, a private educational institution in Mapusa, which offered three years of lyceum education. He managed this institution for approximately four years. Later, he served as the Director of the Collage Almaidi in Ponda, where he taught basic Marathi, Portuguese, and the lyceum curriculum. In 1938, he opened a student hostel but left the leadership of the college due to internal differences. Subsequently, he founded the Institute Renaissance in Margao, a private entity offering seven years of lyceum education, which he ran for five years.

=== Media and Government service ===
In 1959, Sardesai moved to New Delhi, where he worked on a contract basis at the Delhi Radio Station as a Supervisor for the Konkani and Portuguese language departments. During this period, he worked for five years to counter Portuguese propaganda regarding Goan politics. He eventually resigned from this position to return to Goa.

== Goa liberation movement ==
Sardesai was actively involved Goa liberation movement. He used his writing to raise social awareness, notably publishing a pamphlet titled Phulai Gawdo Conversion Case from Mumbai to expose the Phulai case in South Goa, for which he was jailed for eight days.

He was a member of the Gomantak Congress and participated in the civil liberties movement on 18 June. He also worked toward the establishment of the Goa National Congress in Mumbai. On 18 October 1946, he was imprisoned for performing Satyagraha. Throughout 1947 and 1948, he organized various meetings. He was arrested by Portuguese police while holding a meeting at Sakirwal Dodamarg and sentenced by the Regional Military Court to one year in the Dim Aguadilla prison.

In 1949, he attended the National Congress session at Londha. He spent nearly a decade in Mumbai continuing his work for the independence movement, where he held conferences and served as the Secretary of the National Congress Goa. He also served as the welcoming president for the Goa Political Conference session in Mumbai. His political associates included Laxmikant Bhembre and Narayan Bhembre.

== Literary career ==
Sardesai viewed literature as a tool for social awareness and political activism. His writing career spanned from 1929 to 1983. He began writing under the pseudonym Saimik in the weekly Bharat at the age of 18 and later contributed to the Hindu. He attempted to launch his own paper, Tej, and his writings were featured in various Marathi and Portuguese publications, including Dudhsagar, Prakash, Kesari, and Oo Herald.

He is credited with mechanizing the Marathi short story and was known as a "regional storyteller" for his depiction of Goan life, nature, and philosophy. His first foray into fiction was Yashvantat Sasukhasini (1929). His story Mohini won second place in the Yashvant story competition. His work often attracted criticism from orthodox sections of society (Sanatanis) for his portrayal of aesthetics and romance. Notable stories include Sagarchya Laata, Shaslalele Buruj, Jagavegala, Vadalati Naukaa, Nivara, Sonori Unhan, Laxmanresha, and Chandal.

Sardesai also wrote novels, including the political novel Mandvi Tu Atali and Brahman, a translation of a Portuguese novel. His portrait collection, Govyakadachi Manse, was also popular. Believing that expression was best in one's mother tongue, he later wrote extensively in Konkani. His significant Konkani works include Papada Kavalyo, Ramgyaali Waga Bhowandi (a children's novel), Kathashilpa (literary review), and Khabri Kaay Varmacheo Kaay Karmacheo (fine essays).

== Awards ==
- Sahitya Akademi Award (1982) for his essay collection Khabri.
- State Award for Literature from the Government of Goa (1980).
- Goa Kala Academy Literature Award.
- Gold Medal Awarded at the Gomantak Marathi Sahitya Sammelan in Vile Parle for his story collection Laxmanresha.
- First prize for Marathi in an international story competition by the Herald Tribune.
