= Tanaji Halarnkar =

Indian Konkani scholar (1943–2020)

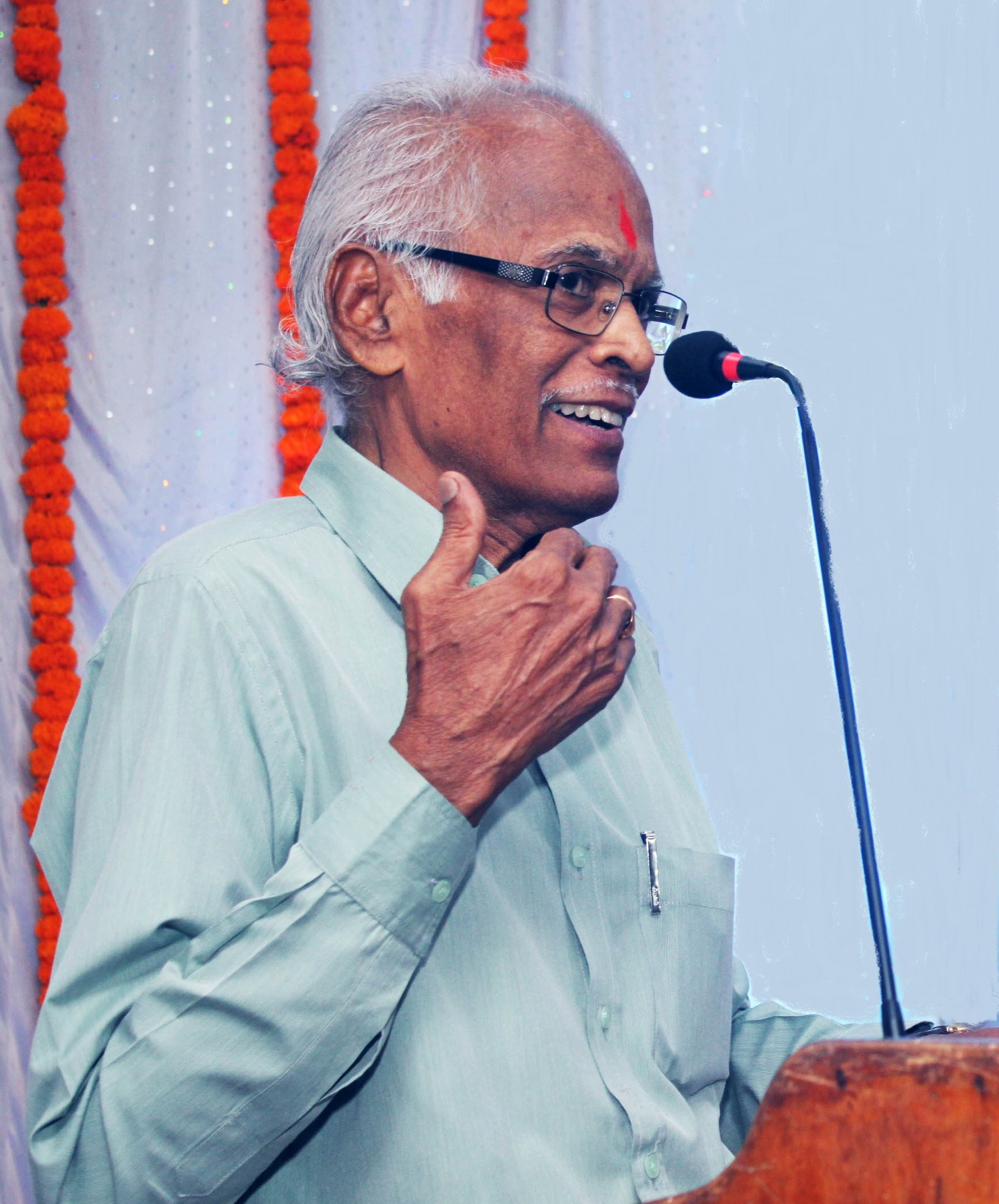
Dr. Tanaji Halarnkar

Tanaji Halarnkar (18 September 1943 – 19 October 2020) was a Konkani scholar, columnist and former editor of the Konkani Encyclopedia (Konkani Vishwakosh). Halarnkar played a prominent role in the pro-Konkani language agitation in the Goa of the 1980s, and also in the wider movement for the promotion of the Konkani language in Goa and other parts of western coastal India. His other contributions include helping develop scientific and technical terminology for Konkani. He was involved with organising Konkani literary events, authored books, and did his Ph.D. on the gram panchayats (village councils) of Goa.

== Contribution ==
Following his death in October 2020, the Times of India credited him with having spent "12 years of his life in [the] preparation of the Konkani encyclopedia". The Konkani Encyclopedia was later donated to the public domain under a Creative Commons license by the Goa University. It was published in four volumes, and is now available online too.

The Times of India commented:

If he had to dedicate the same amount of time to his own writings, Halarnkar would have had several awards of the like of [the] Sahitya Akademi to boast of. However, he felt it was more important for the future of Konkani to create scientific, legal and technical terminology.

Halarnkar also helped develop scientific and technical terminology in the Konkani language, a task undertaken by the Union Ministry of Human Resource Development's Administrative Terminology Commission. This was seen as particularly important after Konkani in the Devanagari script was granted official-language status in Goa and speedily needed to cope with the challenging demands of being used in the administration.

Leaders of the Konkani movement praised Halarnkar's qualities – his ability to bring about a consensus and avoid disputes, his intense work for the Konkani movement that would bring benefits in the future (both the Konkani Vishwakosh and the National Translation Mission), his guidance for the Konkani Bhasha Mandal, and his contribution to networking Konkani speakers and protagonists by reviving activities of the Konkani parishad that connects these regions.

== Konkani Vishwakosh (Encyclopedia) ==
Wikimedia notes that the Konkani Vishwakosh is a four-volume hard copy encyclopedia—totalling in all 3632 pages—that has been published by the Goa University. The work took some 14 years to complete. It encompasses the world's information in a nutshell with special emphasis and detailed information on Goa, Konkani, Goan culture, folklore, history, geography etc. The encyclopedia is written in Konkani. The Vishwakosh has served "as a primary source of information and one of the most important documented texts for a community of nearly 2.5 million Konkani speakers spread across India and worldwide". It has also been used as the base for many articles in the Konkani Wikipedia.

The Konkani Vishwakosh was initiated by the poet-laureate and former Goa University professor Manohar Rai Sardesai. Following his death, the initiative was led by Halarnkar. Goa University staff Ranjan Naik, Kalpana Naik, Kanchan Mordekar, Surekha Naik, Mukesh Thali and Shailendra Mehta also contributed to the compilation process of this encyclopedia.

== Personal life ==
Halarnkar was born in Bandora in Portuguese Goa. He died on 19 October 2020 in Goa, at the age of 77. He is succeeded by two children and his wife. Halarnkar lived at Porvorim.

== Honours, achievements ==
He was also the president of the twenty-third session (adhiveshan) of the All India Konkani Parishad held in Mangalore in April 2002. He served as the vice-president of the Goa Konkani Akademi. The Mangalore-based World Konkani Centre also appointed him as honorary director of Konkani Bhaas and shikshan (Konkani language and education). He was president of the Konkani Bhasha Mandal, a group that works to promote the language in Goa and elsewhere. Halarnkar was awarded the Goa State Cultural Award in 2012. In 2011, the Thomas Stephens Konkani Kendr bestowed on him the Konkani Puraskar. He was awarded the Goa Konkani Akademi Sahitya Pradnya Puruskar award as well.

Halarnkar authored books including Fagur Fatt in Konkani, and a book on the gram-panchayats in Goa, based on his Ph.D. thesis.
