= Oklahoma City tornado =

Oklahoma City tornado may refer to:

- 1998 Oklahoma City tornadoes
- 1999 Bridge Creek–Newcastle–Oklahoma City–Moore tornado
- 2003 Oklahoma City area tornado
- 2003 North Oklahoma City tornado
- 2013 South Oklahoma City–Moore tornado
