= Govindrao Verlekar =

Govindrao Verlekar (born 7 June 1908) was an Indian singer and actor from Mapusa, Goa. He was an exponent of the Gandharva gayaki style of singing and is known for his stage roles in musical plays as well as his efforts in preserving Goa's musical tradition.

== Early life and education ==
Verlekar was born on 7 June 1908 in Mapusa. He completed his primary education in Marathi and his secondary education in Portuguese.

He developed an interest in vocal music at the age of ten, starting his singing career by performing bhajans before moving on to musical theater. He received no formal training in music; instead, he taught himself by listening to, observing, and studying other performing artists.

== Career ==
Verlekar balanced his artistic career with managing his family's traditional jewelry business. He performed in both public and private music concerts (mehfils) and worked as an artist with Dinanath Mangeshkar's theater company. He also gained recognition as the final lead actor ("hero") of the Gandharva Mandali.

During his theatrical career, he performed on stage alongside several prominent artists, including Sakharam Barve, Rajaram Jadhav, Bal Gandharva, Dinanath Mangeshkar, Raghuvir Sawkar, Manohar Shirgaonkar, Malbarao Sardesai, Anant Parsekar, Shripad Nevrekar, Suresh Haldankar, Goharbai, and Vishnupant Pagnis.

Verlekar portrayed notable characters such as Dhairyadhar, Bhishmak, and Arjun in classical musical plays, including Manapaman, Swayamvar, Saubhadra, and Ekach Pyala. Later in his career, he offered singing lessons in Bombay.

== Musical style and legacy ==
As an inheritor of the Gandharva singing tradition, Verlekar was recognized for his control over rhythm, tempo, and musical notes. He earned acclaim for his contribution to sustaining and preserving the vocal music heritage of Goa.
