= Sinai (surname) =

- Language: Arabic; Hebrew: סיני; Konkani; Persian: سینایی; Bengali: সেন

Other names
- Variant forms: Hebrew: Sinay; Konkani: Shenoy; Bengali: Sen

Sinai is a surname. It is a Portuguese-style spelling of the Konkani surname Shenoy or Shenai. This spelling originated from Goa on the West Coast of India. It is also an Arabic and Hebrew surname and masculine given name derived from Mount Sinai. In the United States, the 2010 Census found 367 people with the surname Sinai, making it the 55,841st-most-common name in the country. This represented an increase from 277 people (66,676th-most common) in the 2000 Census. In both censuses, about eight-tenths of the bearers of this surname identified as white, one-tenth as Hispanic, and three percent as Asian. The Sinai families in India belong to the Brahmin caste.

== People ==
Notable people with this surname include:

- Narana Sinai Coissoró (born 1933), Portuguese politician of Goan origin
- Yakov Sinai (born 1935), Russian mathematician
- Khosrow Sinai (1941–2020), Iranian film director
- Allen Sinai (fl. 1961–present), American economist
- Moshe Sinai (born 1961), Israeli footballer
- Avraham Sinai (born Ibrahim Yassin, 1962), Lebanese-born Hezbollah member who converted to Judaism
- Nick Sinai (born 1970s), American government official and venture capitalist

== Fictional characters ==
Fictional characters with this surname include:

- Saleem Sinai, the protagonist of Salman Rushdie's 1981 novel Midnight's Children
