= Basti Vaman Shenoy =

Indian writer (1934–2022)

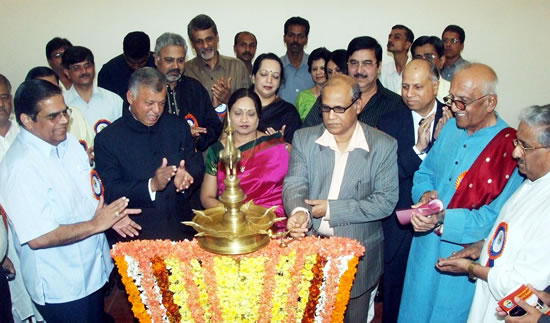
- Shenoy in 2010
- Born: 6 November 1934; Bantwal, Karnataka, British Raj
- Died: 2 January 2022 (aged 87); Thumbe, Karnataka, India
- Occupations: Writer, political activist
- Writing career
- Movement: Konkani Language

Basti Vaman Madhav Shenoy (6 November 1934 – 2 January 2022) was an Indian Konkani activist, popularly known as "Vishwa Konkani Sardar" (World Konkani Leader) and was the founder of World Konkani Centre in Shakthinagar, Mangalore.

== Early life ==
Basti Vaman Shenoy was born on 6 November 1934 in Bantwal, a town in Dakshina Kannada District of Karnataka. His father Basti Madhav Shenoy, popularly known as Motra Madhav, was booking agent of the CPC Bus Service of Mangalore. Vaman Shenoy's mother was Gowri alias Bhagirathi. He passed out of Tenth Standard (SSLC) in 1952 from the SVS High School in Bantwal. He wanted to pursue higher education and become a teacher but due to his family conditions he had to leave school and join his father to help in his business. For a brief period he also worked in Canara Bank. Vaman Shenoy's father died in 1957 and with this the responsibility of whole family fell on the shoulders of Vaman Shenoy. He married Savithri in 1959.

== Career ==
=== Social service ===
Shenoy was involved in the Indian National Congress, and its trade union wing INTUC activities in Bantwal between 1954 and 1962. During this period he was influenced by T. A. Pai. Shenoy was instrumental in founding Saraswathi Kala Prasarak Sangh and Saraswathi Sangeeth Shala Bantwal in 1958. He was also an active member of Yashvanth Vyayam Shala, and took part in Konkani dramas and theatrical activities during festivities in Bantwal.

He joined Rotary International in 1972 and rendered his service to the society as Rotarian in various capacities. In 1974 he organised eye camps and dental camps in Bantwal Taluk. For his humanitarian initiatives in providing relief to the flood victims of 1974 Flood of Netravati River in Bantwal Taluk he received Special Significance Award in Rotary Dist. 318 at Mysore. He became the president of Rotary Club in Moodabidri and organised eye camps and dental camps along with other social initiatives.

In 1977 he became the correspondent of SVS Schools in Bantwal. During this term he constructed a new building block for School Library. Basti Vaman Shenoy became the president of Yashavanth Vyayam Shala in Bantwal in 1980. He took initiative to revive the age old "Mall Khamb" and organised performance tours to several places in Karnataka. In association with Kasturba Medical College he set up an Outreach Specialist Clinic in Vyayama Shala premises in 1988.

T. A. Pai asked him to join Syndicate Bank in 1962. He joined Panemangalore branch as clerk. Within 20 months he was promoted as officer. In 1968 he became the manager of newly started Raibhag branch in Belagaum District. In 1972 he transferred and returned to Panemangalore where he started his banking career and became manager of the branch.

In 1974 villages on the banks of River Netravati in Bantwal Taluk got submerged in the flood. Basti Vaman Shenoy took initiative in setting up several relief camps in the Taluk and supported the industry and trade activities by refinancing the traders through Syndicate Bank. He served Syndicate Bank in various branches including Shimoga and Moodabidri until his voluntary retirement in 1992.

=== Konkani activism ===
Basti Vaman Shenoy's membership of the Konkani Bhasha Mandal, Karnataka dates back to 1980 but it was in 1992 after his retirement from his banking career he devoted himself completely to Konkani activities. Paul Moras, the president of the Konkani Bhasha Mandal, Karnataka entrusted him with the post of Organising Secretary of the Konkani Jatha a movement for organising people to demand establishment of Konkani Academy. He and others toured extensively to organise 'Jathas' (Rally) in several cities of Karnataka State. Jatha submitted the Memorandum demanding Konkani Academy for the state with the Karnataka Government in October 1992.

In 1993 Basti Vaman Shenoy became the president of Konkani Bhasha Mandal Karnataka. He initiated teaching of Konkani language in Canara High School, Mangalore. He lobbied the Karnataka state government for the establishment of Konkani Academy. Chief Minister of Karnataka Veerappa Moily announced the establishment of Konkani Academy in the state. Thus Karnataka Konkani Sahitya Academy came into existence.

In 1995 from 16 to 22 December, under the auspices of Konkani Bhasha Mandal Karnataka, as Chief Convener, Basti Vaman Shenoy organised First World Konkani Convention in Mangalore. Margaret Alva, the then Central Minister was the Hon. Chairman, and K.K.Pai was the chairman of the Organising Committee. 5000 delegates from all over the world attended this convention. The convention brought together Konkani speaking people from all regions, religion, dialect and sub communities. The then Chief Minister of Karnataka H.D. Deve Gowda inaugurated the convention. The 7 days convention consisting of seminars, debates, cultural presentations, exhibition and food festival was a grand success. Delegates honoured Basti Vaman Shenoy with a title of "Vishwa Konkani Sardar" (World Leader of Konkani). Basti Vaman Shenoy presented before the gathering of world representatives of Konkani people his dream to establish a permanent entity for the preservation and promotion of Konkani language, art and culture. The convention unanimously gave a mandate to establish World Konkani Centre in Mangalore with a resolution in the valedictory function of the convention.

In 1996, Shenoy inaugurated the First North American Konkani Convention at New Jersey, United States. He toured North American cities promoting the cause of Konkani during his visit. In 1997, Shenoy became the president of Karnataka Konkani Saithya Academy. He served two terms as President of academy till 2001. During his tenure as President of academy he initiated a process of lobbying with the Government of Karnataka to introduce Konkani in the schools of Karnataka as the optional third language. Under his tenure Academy produced "Konkani Samanthar Shabdakosh", a series of books on stalwarts of Konkani community "Konkani Mahamanest Pustakmala" and a volume on showcasing the rich Konkani art form of Kavi murals "Konkanyali Kavikala" written by Dr. Krishnanand Kamath. In 1998 Academy organised a three-day "Konkani Kala Utsav" in New Delhi. President Basti Vaman Shenoy led the 130 member cultural team to showcase Konkani Culture at the capital city. He was instrumental in organising workshop for developing teaching material in Konkani language in collaboration of Central Institute of Indian Languages in 2001. This workshop successfully brought out a Konkani Primer Book called "Konkani Kalo".

In 2002, as the Organising Committee chairman, Basti Vaman Shenoy successfully organised the 20th Adhiveshan of All India Konkani Parishad in Mangalore.

In 2004 he became the president of All India Konkani Parishad, took charge at the 26th Adhiveshan held at Kozhikode.

Shenoy served as one of the three jury members for the 2015 Sahitya Akademi Award (Konkani).

==== Konkani Language and Cultural Foundation ====
KLCF was promoted by Konkani Bhasha Mandal Karnatak to fulfil the mandate of the delegates of World Konkani Convention to establish World Konkani Centre at Mangalore. It came into being immediately after the World Konkani Convention in 1995. Basti Vaman Shenoy became its president. Banker, philanthropist and social leader K. K. Pai became Chairman of the KLCF. The Foundation stone marking the beginning of construction work was laid in a ceremony in September 2005 by P. Dayanand Pai. The then Union Minister Oscar Fernandes and Cooperative Minister of Government of Karnataka Shri R. V. Deshpande were present. Basti Vaman Shenoy toured relentlessly to raise funds for this project in India and abroad.

==== Vishwa Konkani Abhiyan ====
Under the auspices of KLCF, Basti Vaman Shenoy initiated a movement called Visha Konkani abhiyan aimed at creating opportunity of interaction between Konkani writers and scholars with their counterparts in other languages of the country. The Abhiyan was inaugurated at New Delhi on 12 October 2008 by former Union Minister Margaret Alva. M. Veerappa Moily released a book on Rashtrakavi M. Govinda Pai translated to Hindi from Konkani. Economist and Sanskrit scholar V. R. Panchamukhi (former chairman ICSSR) presided over the function. A seminar "Integration Through Languages" was held in which scholars from Panjabi, Hindi, Persian, Urdu, Kannada and Konkani languages participated. Similar programs were held in Baroda, Mumbai and Pune.

==== World Konkani Centre ====
World Konkani Centre, built on a 3-acre plot called Konkani Gaon (Konkani Village) at Shakti Nagar, Mangalore was inaugurated by Shri Digambar Kamat, Honorable Chief Minister of Goa on 17 January 2009. The World Konkani Centre named after chief patrons Dr. P. Dayananda Pai and P. Satish Pai consists of a library, a museum and convention facilities like boardroom, seminar hall and auditorium. As per the KLCF the centre is founded "to serve as a nodal agency for the preservation and overall development of Konkani language, art and culture involving all the Konkani people the world over."

On 6 March 2010, Vishwa Konkani Bhasha Samsthan (World Institute of Konkani Language) and World Konkani Hall of Fame were inaugurated by journalist Rajdeep Sardesai at World Konkani Centre. A Konkani ethnic shoppe was inaugurated by Ramdas Kamath U. (Senior Vice-president, Infosys Technologies Ltd.) on this occasion.

== Awards and recognitions ==
Shenoy was awarded the Rajyotsava Prashasti by Government of Karnataka in 2010 He is also the recipient of Language Award by Karnataka Konkani Sahitya Academy in 2008

== Personal life and death ==
Shenoy died at his home in Thumbe, on 2 January 2022, at the age of 87 due to age related illness. His wife Savithri had died several years ago. They have two sons, Madhav and Dinesh, and a daughter Vidya Kini.
