= Malbarao Sardesai =

Indian musician (1911 – 2005)

Malbarao Madhav Suryarao Sardesai

Background information
- Born: 31 December 1911; Savoi-Verem, Goa, Portuguese India
- Died: 23 December 2005 (aged 93)
- Instruments: Pakhawaj, fiddle, tabla, harmonium, flute
- Relatives: Laxmanrao Sardesai

Malbarao Madhav Suryarao Sardesai (31 December 1911 – 23 December 2005) was an Indian composer and musician from Goa. He was a researcher of the Ghumta (drum) and served as the President of the Swaramanch Music School in Madgaon.

== Early life and education ==
Sardesai was born on 31 December 1911 in Savoi-Verem, Goa. He completed his primary education at the Government School in Savoi-Verem and pursued his Lyceum education in Panaji.

Coming from an affluent family, Sardesai was able to pursue formal training in music from a young age. He studied the Tabla under Khapruji Parvatkar, also known as "Laybhaskar", until the age of 14. He subsequently studied the harmonium for six years under a teacher named Madhukar.

== Career ==
Sardesai was a multi-instrumentalist who played the pakhawaj and the fiddle. He notably also played the harmonium and the flute, which he learnt while in the company of Alladiya Khan for 14 years.

Throughout his career, he worked as an accompanist for various prominent musicians, including the Gandharvas and Kasikarbuva. He was also employed at the All India Radio station in Panaji, where he was responsible for selecting music artists.

His musical style was influenced by the traditional soundscapes of temples, including the playing of the panchvadya, the mridangam, and the performance of bhajans and kirtans. He focused on various traditional folk forms and rhythms, including Dholken, Shimgya meel-kheel, Romat tali, Talgadi, Ghodemodani, Dhalo, Jagar, Kalo, Chandraval, Dastak, and Jakhani.

== Works and publications ==
Sardesai conducted research on the drum, specifically the ghumot. He wrote a book on the subject titled Khamba Ghumtattanchea Savlintt (transl. The Pillar in the Shadow of the Drum), which was published by the Goa Hindu Association in 1970.

He also published two other books regarding music:

- Sulbha Swara Parichaya
- Chakraparadhi

== Death ==
Sardesai died on 23 December 2005.

== Awards and recognition ==
Sardesai received an award from the Government of Goa for his contributions to music. In 1980, he was awarded a Doctorate in music by Khairagarh University.

Pundalik Naik, also from Savoi-Verem, describes Malbarao Sardesai:

I was once a shepherd, a rancon in this my very beautiful village. We live surrounded by flowing water. Cool and crystalline it brings serenity to our days and soothes our nights. The sound of its breath, zul ... zul ... zul ... zul, rocks us in childhood, lulls us to sleep, cheers us as we go about our tasks, its heartbeat steady, with never a flicker. And do you know why its rhythmic flow is so perfect, its music divine? That is because Bab Malbarao lives here.
