= Sudesh Lotlikar =

Indian poet (born 1964)

- Born: Sudesh Sharad Lotlikar; 30 December 1964 (age 61); Bandora, Goa, India
- Spouse: Sharmila Lotlikar
- Children: 2
- Writing career
- Language: Konkani
- Notable work: Pois (1990)

Sudesh Sharad Lotlikar (born 30 December 1964) is an Indian Marathi and Konkani poet, producer and director of documentary films.

== Awards and recognition ==
Lotlikar was selected by the Sahitya Akademi, India's National Academy of Letters, for producing and directing an English language short film based on the life of noted Konkani poet, Manohar Rai Sardesai. It was the first short film of the Akademi based on the life of a Goan personality, encompassing the life and times of Dr. Sardessai. He was also the recipient of Goa Kala Academy prize for his collection of poems "Pois" in 1990. He received the Goa Kala Academy Best Book Award for the period 1990–1995.

The Goa Hindu Association presented Poet Laureate Bakibab Borkar Memorial Award to Lotlikar in 1985.

== Earlier work ==
Lotlikar had earlier produced a short film in Konkani based on the life of Dr. Sardessai for Panaji Doordarshan. He has also produced short films on the lives of Shenoi Goembab, Ravindra Kelekar, Uday Bhembre, D Harihar among others. He has to his credit documentaries on Shri Shantadurga temple, history of Konkani language, Mahadev Temple at Tambdi Surla, Goan Gowda community and a tele-film on the Liberation of Goa - Mukti. Ekantachim Utaram is another of Lotlikar's collection of Konkani poems in charity.
