= Cha (name) =

Cha is a nickname used by people with the given name Charles and its variants. Cha is also both a Chinese and Korean surname

== Nickname ==
- Charles Cha Burns (1957 – 2007), Scottish rock guitarist
- Charleen Cha Cruz-Behag (born 1988), Filipino volleyball player
- Cha Fitzpatrick, nickname of James Fitzpatrick (hurler) (born 1985), Irish hurler
- Charisse Cha Hernandez (born 1993), Filipina politician
- Hideyuki Cha Katō, also known as Kato-chan (born 1943), Japanese comedian and actor
- Jarlath Cha Whelan (1939 – 22 March 1996), Irish hurler

== Other ==
- Dia Cha (born 1960s), Laotian American author and academic

== See also ==
- Cha (Chinese surname)
- Cha (Korean surname)
- Cha. Fra. D'Costa
