= Madhav Manjunath Shanbhag =

Indian lawyer and activist (1873–1950)

- Born: c. 1873; Karwar, Bombay Presidency, British India
- Died: 17 January 1950 (aged 76–77)
- Occupations: Konkani activist, writer
- Writing career
- Literary movement: Konkani language

Madhav Manjunath Shanbhag (c. 1873 – 17 January 1950) was an Indian lawyer and activist on behalf of the Konkani people. He was born in Karwar, Karnataka. With a few like-minded companions he travelled in all the Konkani-speaking areas, seeking to unite the fragmented Konkani community under the banner of 'one language, one script, one literature'. He succeeded in organizing the first Adhiveshan of All India Konkani Parishad in Karwar in 1939.

== Legacy ==
In 2007, Goa Konkani Akademi instituted Madhav Manjunath Shanbhag Konkani Bhasha Seva Puraskar, an award including a cash prize of Rs. 25,000. It is a lifetime achievement award for those over 50 years of age who have worked as an activist, leader, or organiser for the Konkani language. In 2009, J. B. Moraes won the award.
