= Sumitra Mangesh Katre =

Indian linguist

Dr. Sumitra Mangesh Katre
- Born: April 11, 1906
- Died: October 21, 1998 (aged 92)

Sumitra Mangesh Katre (Prof. S. M. Katre) (11 April 1906 – 21 October 1998) was a lexicographer and an Indo Aryan and Paninian linguist. He was born at Honnavar, Karnataka and died in San Jose, California, USA. Katre initiated the gigantic Sanskrit Dictionary Project, An Encyclopedic Dictionary of Sanskrit on Historical Principles, with its 11 million slips preserved in the scriptorium.

His 1966 work The Formation of Konkani is his tribute to his mother tongue Konkani. S. M. Katre used the instruments of modern historical and comparative linguistics across six typical Konkani dialects, and showed the formation of Konkani to be distinct from that of Marathi. He was president of the 7th Session of the All India Konkani Parishad held 27–28 April 1957 at Mumbai.

== Bibliography ==
- A glossary of grammatical elements and operations in Aṣṭādhyāyī. Ed. Central Institute of Indian Languages, 1981
- Aṣṭādhyāyī of Pāṇini. Ed. Motilal Banarsidass Publ., 1989. ISBN 978-81-208-0521-7
- Dictionary of Pāṇini: Gaṇapātha. Ed. Deccan College Postgraduate and Research Institute, Poona, 1971
- Problems of Reconstruction in Indo-Aryan, Indian Institute of Advanced Study, Simla, 1968
- The Formation of Konkani, Deccan College Postgraduate and Research Institute, Poona, 1966
- Some Problems of Historical Linguistics in Indo-Aryan, Deccan College Postgraduate and Research Institute, Poona, 1965
- Prakrit Languages and Their Contribution to Indian Culture, Deccan College Postgraduate and Research Institute, Poona, 1964
