= Dayananda Pai =

Indian real estate developer

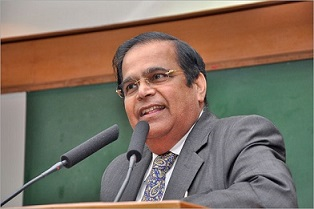
- Born: 1945 (age 80–81)
- Occupations: real estate developer, philanthropist, educationist

Dayananda Pai (born 1945) is an Indian billionaire real estate developer, philanthropist and educationist in Bangalore, India. He is a managing trustee and board trustee of B.M.S college and Bharatiya Vidya Bhavan, and is the syndicate member of Manipal University and the National Institute of Technology, Surathkal and a former syndicate member of Mangalore University. Pai was awarded the Karnataka Udyog award and the Karnataka Rajyotsva award for social and charitable activities. He was conferred an honorary doctorate by Mangalore University for his exceptional contribution to the field of education and philanthropy.

== Assassination attempt ==
In October 2012, Pai's car was shot by two motorbikers after getting calls from a Bangkok-based extortionist. Two motorbikers came from both sides of his car and each shot the car once. Pai was saved by his bullet proof Bentley.
