= Certified Hotel Administrator =

Certification for hotel management

Certified Hotel Administrator (CHA) is the highest certification from the American Hotel & Lodging Educational Institute.

To be eligible, individuals must fall into one of the following categories:

1. General Manager, owner/operator in a lodging hospitality company, or corporate executive at a lodging hospitality company responsible for the operation of two or more properties. A corporate executive is defined as "individual, employed by a firm responsible for the operation of two or more properties, who serves as a regional or corporate director of operations, or has ultimate corporate responsibility for rooms, marketing, accounting and finance, food and beverage, human resources, or engineering."
2. Assistant General Manager or Director of Operations/Rooms Division (after successfully completing the Certified Rooms Division Executive certification)

According to the American Hotel & Lodging Educational Institute, the CHA exam consists of 200 multiple-choice questions that must be answered within a four-hour time period. All test questions are designed to test the candidate's mastery of various competencies derived from six key areas of knowledge in combination with on-the-job hospitality work experience. The key areas of testing are:

1. Financial management
2. Sales and marketing
3. Leadership management
4. Human resources management
5. Rooms management
6. Food and beverage management

== College credits ==
CHA's can earn undergraduate or graduate credit for their certification when they enroll in certain programs of study from two private for-profit institutions: the American Public University and the University of Phoenix. The American Council on Education (ACE) determined the CHA certification is worth six semester credits at an upper-division baccalaureate degree level and three semester credits at a graduate degree levels.
