= Krishna Shenoy =

American neuroscientist

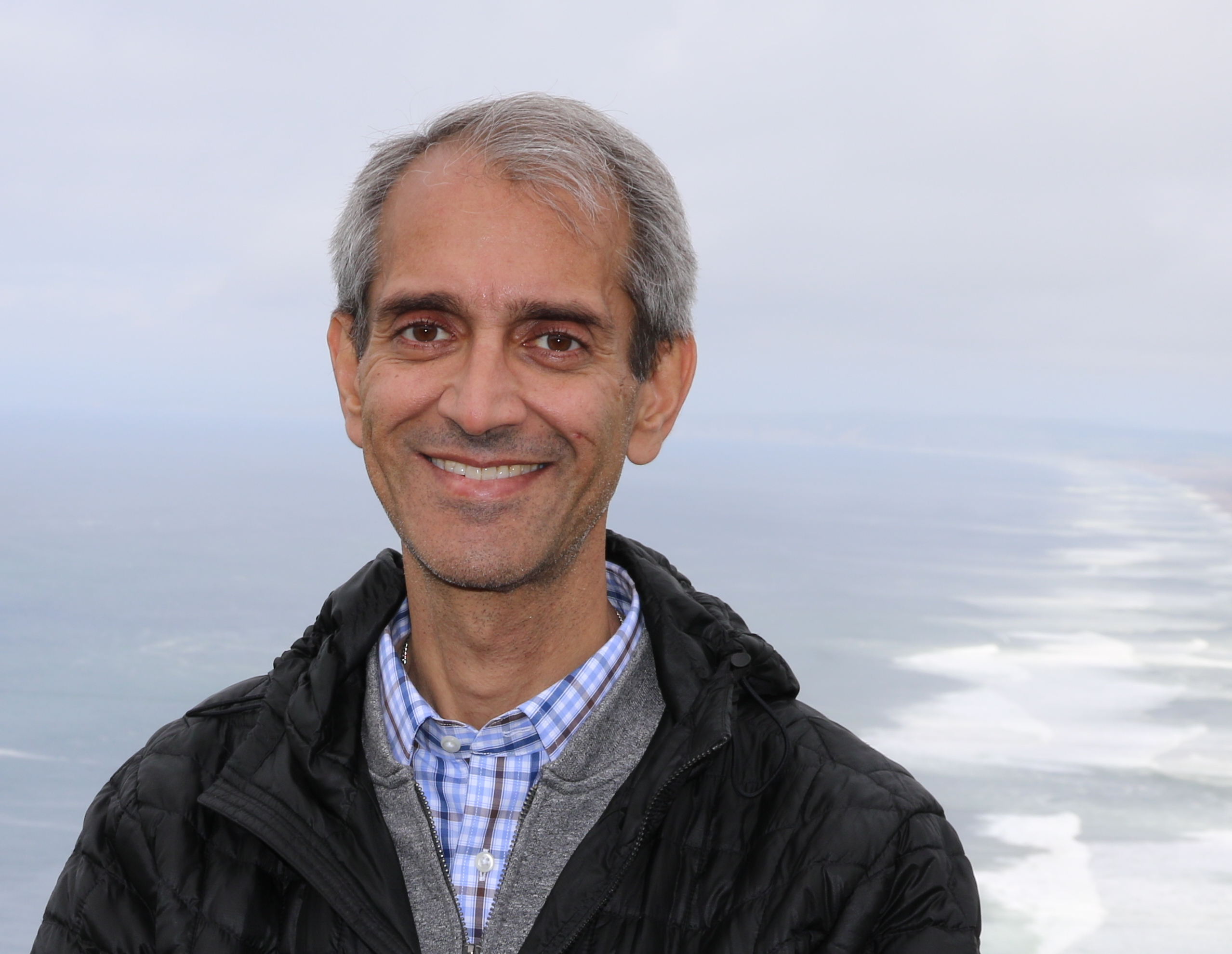
- Born: Krishna Vaughn Shenoy; September 3, 1968; Sabetha, Kansas
- Died: January 21, 2023 (aged 54); Palo Alto, California
- Scientific career
- Fields: Neuroscience; Neurotechnology

Krishna Vaughn Shenoy (1968–2023) was an American neuroscientist and neuroengineer at Stanford University. Shenoy was the Hong Seh and Vivian W. M. Lim Professor in the Stanford University School of Engineering. He focused on neuroscience topics, including neurotechnology such as brain-computer interfaces. On 21 January 2023, he died after a long battle with pancreatic cancer. According to Google Scholar, he amassed an h-index of 79.

== Research ==
Shenoy obtained a B.S. in Electrical and Computer Engineering from UC Irvine (1987–1990) and a Ph.D. in Electrical Engineering and Computer Science from MIT (1990–1995). He was then a postdoctoral fellow in Neurobiology at Caltech (1995–2001).

In 2001, Shenoy joined the Department of Electrical Engineering at Stanford University as an assistant professor, and was promoted to associate professor in 2008, and then to full professor in 2012. In 2017 he was appointed as the inaugural Hong Seh and Vivian W. M. Lim Professor (endowed chair). He also held courtesy appointments in the departments of Bioengineering, Neurobiology and Neurosurgery.

At Stanford, Shenoy was a member of the Wu Tsai Neurosciences Institute and the Bio-X Institute. He was the Director of Stanford's Neural Prosthetic Systems Laboratory and the co-director of the Neural Prosthetics Translational Laboratory at Stanford University. Within these positions, he aimed to restore motor function to paralyzed individuals. In 2015 Shenoy became an investigator with the Howard Hughes Medical Institute.

Shenoy and his team made fundamental discoveries about how the brain encodes and executes motor commands, applying those insights to improving brain-computer interfaces. To this end, they developed a mathematical framework for analyzing neural activity called 'computation through dynamics'.

In 2022 Shenoy was elected member of the National Academy of Medicine "For making seminal contributions both to basic neuroscience and to translational and clinical research. His work has shown how networks of motor cortical neurons operate as dynamical systems, and he has developed new technologies to provide new means of restoring movement and communication to people with paralysis."

In 2022 he was also elected as a Fellow of the IEEE "For contributions to cortical control of movement and brain-computer interfaces."

== Patents ==
- US 9095455B2, "Brain machine interfaces incorporating neural population dynamics"
- US 9373088B2, "Brain machine interface utilizing a discrete action state decoder in parallel with a continuous decoder for a neural prosthetic device"
- US 8792976B2, "Brain machine interface"
- US 20150245928A1, "Brain-Machine Interface Utilizing Interventions to Emphasize Aspects of Neural Variance and Decode Speed and Angle"
- US 7058445B2, "Decoding of neural signals for movement control"
- WO 2003005934A3, "Cognitive state machine for prosthetic systems"
- US 20030023319A1, "Cognitive state machine for prosthetic systems"
- US 6609017B1, "Processed neural signals and methods for generating and using them"
