= T. S. Shanbhag =

Indian bookseller (1937–2021)

- Born: 2 May 1937; Kundapur, Madras Presidency, British India
- Died: 4 May 2021 (aged 84); Bangalore, India
- Education: Bombay University
- Occupation: Bookseller

T. S. Shanbhag (2 May 1937 – 4 May 2021) was an Indian bookseller who was the owner of Bangalore's famous Premier Bookshop.

== Early life ==
Shanbhag was born on 2 May 1937 in Kundapur in modern day coastal Karnataka. He started his career working at his uncle's book store, Strand Book Stall, in Bombay after completion of his matriculation. During this time he completed his post graduate degree in economics from the Bombay University. After ten years in the city, he moved to Bangalore when his uncle started a book club, Strand Book Club, in partnership with a publisher.

== Career ==
Shanbhag started Premier Bookshop in the city in 1971 at the site of a burned-down clothing store. The bookshop became an iconic landmark in the city and was considered a go-to location for academic books and other books that were considered hard to procure. The book store, which was located in the city's Church Street near M. G. Road, closed down in 2009, unable to keep up with the increase in rents in the region. The book store was known for its chaotic arrangement with piles of books stacked up and Shanbhag navigating the setup and making recommendations for the customers. At the time of its closure the bookstore had a collection of over 500,000 books, most of which were disposed of at steep discounts and others donated to local libraries. A retrospective of his career, "Walk down memory lane with Shanbhag", was organized in 2016. Referred to as Shanbhag Uncle by the younger generation, he was credited with getting an entire generation of young Bangaloreans to read.

Some of his patrons included historian Ramachandra Guha, actor Kamal Haasan, playwright Girish Karnad, historian Janaki Nair, author U. R. Ananthamurthy, restaurateur Prem Koshy and politician George Fernandes.

== Personal life ==
Shanbhag was married and had a daughter, and lived in the Basaveshwaranagar neighborhood in West Bangalore. He died on 4 May 2021 from complications of COVID-19. He was aged 84.
