= Melvyn Rodrigues =

Indian poet (born 1962)

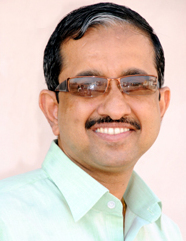
- Rodrigues in 2015
- Born: 8 July 1962 (age 64); Mangalore, Karnataka, India
- Education: St. Aloysius College, University of Mysore
- Occupations: Poet, editor, corporate director
- Spouse: Averyl
- Children: 1
- Writing career
- Language: Konkani
- Notable work: Prakriticho Paas (poetry collection)
- Notable awards: Sahitya Akademi Award (2011)

Melvyn Rodrigues (born 8 July 1962) is an Indian poet and literary activist from Mangaluru who writes in the Konkani language. In 2011, he was honored with the Sahitya Akademi Award for his collection of poems titled Prakriticho Paas.

== Early life and education ==
Rodrigues was born in 1962 in Mangaluru. He completed his schooling at Milagres High School and later attended St. Aloysius College, where he earned a Bachelor of Arts. He subsequently obtained a Master of Arts from Mysore University.

== Career ==
Rodrigues has a career spanning both the corporate and literary sectors. He serves as the director of operations at Daijiworld Media Pvt Ltd.

=== Literary contributions ===
Rodrigues is a prominent figure in modern Konkani poetry. He is the founder of the Kavita Trust, an organization dedicated to the promotion of poetry. His literary output includes several books and poetry collections:

- Bini-pothi: A collection of soliloquies (2004).
- Prakriticho Paas: An anthology of 65 poems (2008), for which he received the Sahitya Akademi Award.
- Fitoied: A collection of poetry (2015).
- Zod-penth: A joint collection of poetry.

In 2023, he was appointed as the Convenor of the Konkani Advisory Board of the Sahitya Akademi for a five-year term (2023–2027).

== Awards and recognition ==
- Sahitya Akademi Award (2011): Conferred for Prakriticho Paas.
- Dr. T.M.A. Pai Foundation Appreciation Award (2009): For Prakriticho Paas.
- Konkani Bhasha Mandal Award (2005): For the book Bini-pothi.
- Karnataka Konkani Sahitya Academy Award (2006)

== Personal life ==
He is married to Averyl and has one son, Gavin.
