= World Konkani Centre =

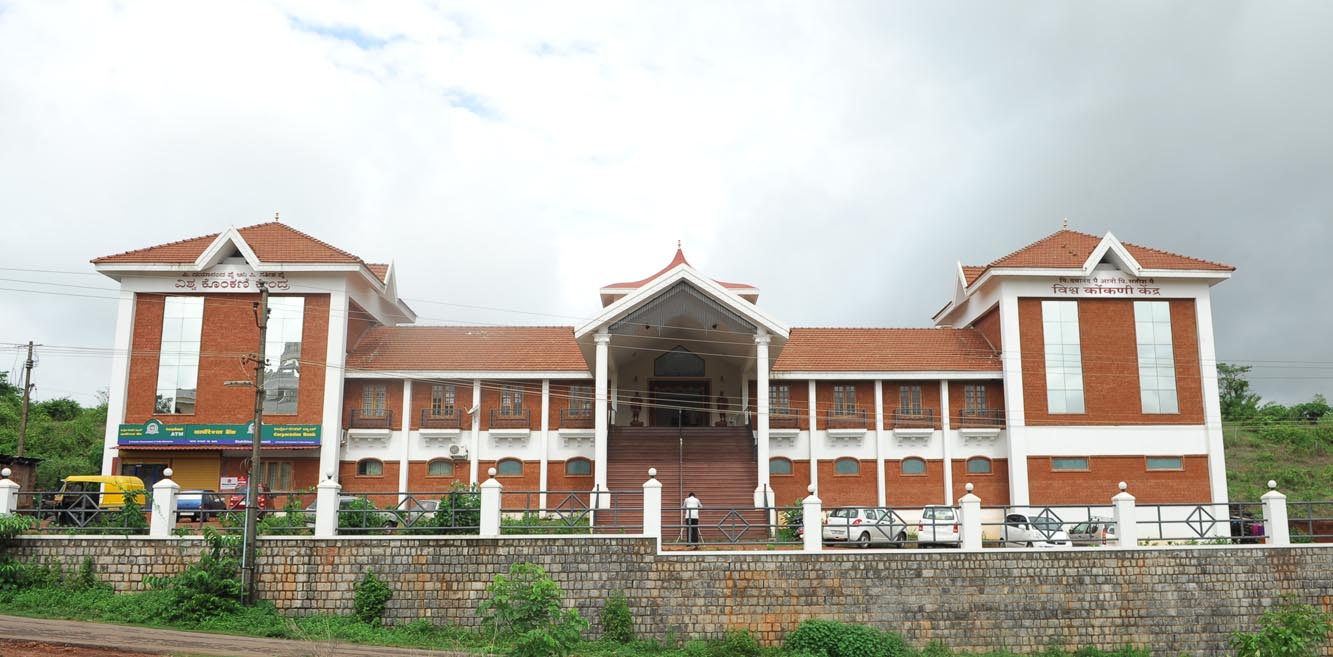
- World Konkani Centre
- Formation: 2009 (Founded by Basti Vaman Shenoy)
- Location: Konkani Gaon, Shakti Nagar, Mangalore, India
- Chairman: Dr. Dayananda Pai (Current); R.V. Deshapande (Emeritus)
- Website: http://www.vishwakonkani.org/

World Konkani Centre was founded by Konkani Bhas Ani Sanskriti Prathistan at Konkani Gaon, Shakti Nagar, Mangalore, to serve as a nodal agency for the preservation and overall development of Konkani language, art and culture involving all the Konkani people the world over.

== Genesis ==
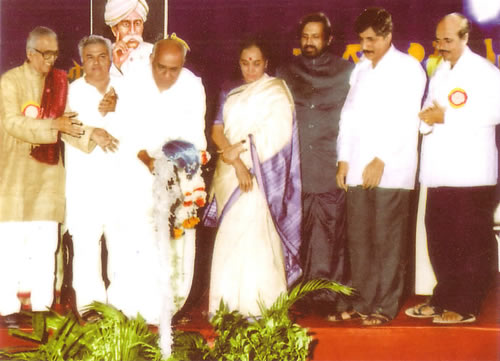
Inauguration of the First World Konkani Convention in 1995 by then Karnataka Chief Minister H.D. Deve Gowda

In 1995 from 16 to 22 December, First World Konkani Convention was held in Mangalore under the auspices of Konkani Bhasha Mandal Karnatak, Konkani activist and organiser Basti Vaman Shenoy was its chief convener. Margaret Alva, the then Central Minister was the Hon. Chairman, and K.K.Pai was the Chairman of the Organising Committee. 5000 delegates from all over the world attended this convention. The convention brought together Konkani speaking people from all regions, religion, dialect and sub communities. The then Chief Minister of Karnataka H.D. Deve Gowda inaugurated the convention. The 7 days convention consisting of seminars, debates, cultural presentations, exhibition and food festival was a grand success. Basti Vaman Shenoy presented before the gathering of world representatives of Konkani people his dream to establish a permanent entity for the preservation and promotion of Konkani language, art and culture. The convention unanimously gave a mandate to establish World Konkani Centre in Mangalore with a resolution in the valedictory function of the convention.

To fulfil the mandate of establishing World Konkani Centre at Mangalore, Konkani Bhasha Mandal, Karnatak founded an organisation called Konkani Bhas Ani Sanskriti Prathistan. It came into being immediately after the World Konkani Convention in 1995 in the leadership of Basti Vaman Shenoy as its President and eminent banker, philanthropist and social leader K.K. Pai as its Chairman. The Foundation stone, marking the beginning of construction work was laid in a ceremony in September 2005 by eminent philanthropist Dr. P. Dayanand Pai. The then Union Minister Oscar Fernandes and Cooperative Minister of Government of Karnataka R.V. Deshapande were present. Basti Vaman Shenoy toured relentlessly to raise funds for this mammoth project all over India and abroad. After the demise of Shri K. K. Pai, the Chairmanship of the KLCF is served by Dr. P. Dayananda Pai, eminent philanthropist.

== The Centre ==
World Konkani Centre, built on a 3-acre plot called Konkani Gaon (Konkani Village) at Shakti Nagar, Mangalore was inaugurated by Shri Digambar Kamat, Hon'ble Chief Minister of Goa on 17 January 2009. The World Konkani Centre named after chief patrons Dr. P. Dayananda Pai and P. Satish Pai consists of a library, a museum and convention facilities like boardroom, seminar hall and auditorium. The noble building was designed by architect Dinesh K. Shet.

== World Konkani Hall Of Fame ==
The World Konkani Hall of Fame is a shrine to great Konkani men and women who have rendered commendable service aimed at the betterment of the society in various fields such as art, folklore, literature, education, science, technology, banking, politics, administration and other fields. The Mandir consists of specially commissioned, hand painted portraits of eminent Konkani people. These portraits are aimed at acknowledging their contributions and also to give the next generation a glimpse of the Konkani people who have made valuable contributions to the society. It has become a focal point for Konkani pride. The shrine has been installed at the upper floor of the left wing of World Konkani Centre. The hall of fame is named after Shri Vittal Kini and Smt. Rukmini V. Kini recognising the generous donation made by their earnest granddaughter Kum. Dhamya Ramadas Kini for developing the World Konkani Hall of Fame.

Vishwa Konkani Keerti Mandir or World Konkani Hall of Fame was inaugurated by Rajdeep Sardesai, Editor-in-Chief of CNN-IBN on 6 March 2010. He unveiled the portrait of his father eminent cricket player and a famous Konkani speaking person, late Dilip Sardesai, at World Konkani Centre. His wife, the Senior Editor of CNN-IBN Sagarika Ghosh, was the guest of honour on the occasion and garlanded the portrait of Dilip Sardesai.

== Vishwa Konkani Student Scholarship Fund ==
World Konkani Centre has instituted the ‘Vishwa Konkani Student Scholarship Fund’ (VKSSF), an initiative to promote higher education among economically backward sections of the Konkani speaking community irrespective of caste or religion. Allocation of scholarship under Vishwa Konkani Student Scholarship Fund is on the basis of the following criteria that the student’s family income should be below Rs 2 lac per annum, the candidate should be eligible for merit seat, scoring distinction and above, students should be willing to sponsor two other students after completion of studies and after securing employment. In the year 2010 World Konkani Centre has distributed scholarships worth Rs 40.5 lac to 135 medical and engineering students in a function held at T V Raman Pai Convention Centre on 20 August 2010.

== World Institute of Konkani Language ==
Late Fabian B. L. Colaco and Smt. Alice Colaco World Institute of Konkani Language (Vishwa Konkani Bhasha Samsthan), was established by Konkani Language and Cultural Foundation in the year 2010, in order to promote research in the areas of Konkani language, culture, social studies, literature, history etc. awards fellowships for research scholars.

== Vishwa Konkani Sahitya Puraskar (Literary Award) ==
World Konkani Centre has instituted an award for best literary work in Konkani language in the name of Vimala V. Pai Vishwa Konkani Sahitya Puraskar. The award consists of a cash component of Rupees One Lakh (Rs.100,000), a citation and a memento. World Konkani Centre will also translate the prize winning book into English, Malayalam and Kannada languages. Vimala V. Pai Vishwa Konkani Sahitya Puraskar 2010 was awarded to "Hawthan" a Konkani novel by Mahabaleshwar Sail. The award ceremony was held at Ravindra Bhavan, Madgaon, Goa in the presence of Chief Minister of Goa Digambar Kamat and Oriya Littérateur Prof. Prafulla Kumar Mohanty.
