= Tornado outbreak of June 13, 1998 =

Weather event in the United States

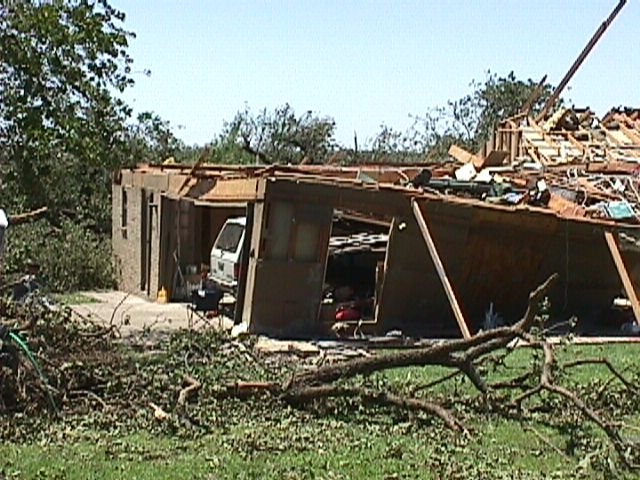
- House damage from Northeast Oklahoma City tornado

Meteorological history
- Formed: June 13, 1998

Tornado outbreak
- Tornadoes: 45
- Max. rating: F2 tornado

Overall effects
- Injuries: 26
- Damage: $7.17 million tornado-related
- Areas affected: Arkansas, Kansas, Nebraska, North Carolina, Oklahoma, Wyoming
- Part of the Tornadoes of 1998

On June 13, 1998, a tornado outbreak occurred across much of the United States. The day saw 45 tornadoes touchdown primarily across Kansas, Nebraska, and Oklahoma. The outbreak saw the Storm Prediction Center outline two Moderate Risk areas in parts of Virginia, North Carolina, and South Carolina, and in parts of Kansas and Nebraska. Additionally, two far more expansive Slight Risk areas were delineated across much of the Central and Eastern United States. By 06:00 UTC June 14, tornadoes had struck parts of six states, including downtown Sabetha, Kansas and parts of North Oklahoma City and the vicinity.

== Meteorological synopsis ==
In advance of the coming tornado outbreak, during the morning of June 13, the Storm Prediction Center (SPC) issued a Moderate Risk for parts of Kansas and Nebraska. It also issued a Slight Risk roughly encompassing an area from south of Dallas and western Mississippi northward and westward to western Oklahoma, Kansas City, and western Nebraska, and northern North Dakota. To the east, the SPC issued a Moderate Risk from far-southeastern Virginia to central North Carolina to central South Carolina to the Atlantic Ocean. A Slight Risk was issued from southern New Jersey to near Washington, D.C. to northern Pennsylvania to western Ohio then southward to eastern Tennessee to southern Georgia to the northeastern Florida coast.

In the eastern United States, the SPC warned of the threat of bow echoes producing damaging winds. An unstable air mass was present across a significant amount of the Southeast, and warm air at the 850-millibar level indicated "elevated mixed layer air". From southeastern Virginia into the mid-South, surface-level dew points were in the 70s °F (21–26 °C). Parallel winds from low-to-mid levels combined with BRN shears predicted to around 30 indicated that bow echoes would be the primary threat. The most intense activity was expected to be confined to an area south and just north of a jet spanning from South Carolina to far-southeastern Virginia. Ahead of a mesoscale vorticity center entering western Georgia, the possibility of a second area of intense activity was noted for the southeastern part of the state coupled with far-northern parts of Florida.

In the Plains, a more tornado-oriented threat was expected to develop. A "moderately" strong upper shortwave was expected to move northeastward toward the central plains later in the day. A highly-unstable air mass south of a front over Texas/Oklahoma was forecast to spread northward into Kansas and Nebraska along with the north-moving warm front. The wind shear profile along and just northeast of the front, particularly in the Moderate Risk area, presented a favorable environment for supercells along with tornadoes. SPC forecasters noted the chance of more isolated severe storms along the dryline/cold front into western Oklahoma by the late afternoon. Additional isolated activity was possible along the western edge of the moisture axis extending from western Nebraska into the Dakotas and along the warm front in Arkansas once it began moving northward.

== Kansas ==
When a severe thunderstorm that formed in Phillips County moved eastward into Smith County, it produced Kansas' first tornado of the day. The short-lived tornado's maximum damage was assessed as F0. Shortly after the end of the tornado's two-minute life, its parent thunderstorm left Kansas and entered Nebraska. Later in the day, an F2 tornado that was the costliest tornado of the day struck the town of Sabetha in Nemaha County. The tornado, which touched down half a mile west of the Sabetha City Hall, caused serious damage to two blocks of the town, with 18 buildings in the downtown area being damaged, five (including the city hall building) to near "the point of loss". The tornado lifted about half a mile east of City Hall. Damage to the city hall building amounted to $2 million, and additional damage to homes and vehicles away from downtown occurred due to tornado-toppled trees and branches away from the tornado's center along with strong straight-line winds.

== Nebraska ==
The first tornado to touch down in the state formed about 30 miles (48 km) west of Sidney. The tornado dissipated only two minutes later, causing no damage. Another tornado would not touch down in the state until the later in the afternoon, when severe thunderstorms initiated across south-central Nebraska in great part due to the presence of a strong jet stream and a north-bound warm front. The first tornado spawned by these particular storms touched down in Gosper County southwest of Elwood. Although the tornado initially headed eastward, it turned left, heading due north. The tornado severely damaged a farmhouse and destroyed nearby outbuildings before later taking on a path straight down U.S. Highway 283. A semi-truck driver and a family of three, finding no path of escape, abandoned their vehicles to take cover in a ditch. While they survived with minor injuries despite the tornado passing almost directly overhead, their vehicles were not so fortunate, and the truck's cargo, composed of ice cream, was completely ruined. This storm went on to produce another tornado which caused no damage and was short-lived.

In Lincoln County, a tornado touched down about five miles south-southwest of Maxwell before coming into contact with Maranatha Bible Camp. Damage at the camp included about 160 blown-down trees, damaged vehicles, and a destroyed shed. The tornado then went on to topple two billboards after crossing Interstate 80. Two houses were damaged and a camper destroyed along the remainder of the tornadoes eight-minute-long track. Peak damage was assessed as F1.

A severe thunderstorm that developed just south of the Kansas/Nebraska border later went on to drop a short-lived F0 tornado about one mile east of Chester. The tornado initially moved to the southeast, hitting a farm and adjacent outbuildings along its path. While the people at the farm were all uninjured, a minimum of 25 irrigation pivots were destroyed.

Multiple other tornadoes occurred during the outbreak that went on to cause little or no damage, and by the end of the day, no tornado-related injuries or fatalities had been reported in the state.

== Oklahoma ==
In the afternoon and evening of June 13, four supercells which had formed near the dryline over Western Oklahoma entered the central part of the state, two of which produced tornadoes, and two of which only produced strong winds and hail. The first of the two tornado-producing storms produced two tornadoes; the former, which touched down near Longdale, injured a child and caused tree damage, ultimately causing F0 damage. The latter tornado, which was ultimately rated F1, caused roof, window, siding, and porch damage to three houses. It also took off the roof of a barn, destroyed an outbuilding, caused fence damage, and took off the hood of a pickup truck.

The second tornadic supercell produced seven tornadoes. The first two tornadoes touched down near El Reno and caused no damage, earning ratings of F0. The third tornado touched down near Yukon but, as with the other two, caused no damage and was rated F0. A fourth tornado touched down over Lake Hefner in Oklahoma City, eventually causing damage to boats in a dry dock at the Oklahoma City Boat Club. Damage to club facilities and nearby boats was estimated at $250,000. The tornado went on to destroy a storage shed and cause minor roof damage to homes east of Lake Hefner Parkway before it dissipated, having caused only F1 damage. The fifth tornado (rated F1) materialized near NW 84th Street and Walker, going on to displace much of a house's roof decking and uproot street signs. The tornado also damaged vehicles and caused roof damage to houses on 84th, 85th, 86th, 87th, and 88th Streets. The tornado destroyed the western half of a church in this area after it knocked down its walls on three sides and threw part of its roof at a house which resultantly suffered major damage. The sixth tornado, which was anticyclonic, affected the Northwest Oklahoma City/Nichols Hills area. It caused "considerable" damage to a strip mall, unroofed numerous houses, shattered windows, and damaged signs and powerlines. One building saw an exterior wall collapse. An RV was thrown into a house, a car flipped, trees were knocked down, and pieces of shingles and roof decking were blown away. The tornado's ultimate rating of F2 was based on damage limited to a small area, and most damage was actually consistent with that of an F1 tornado.

The seventh tornado produced by the second tornadic storm (rated F2), which affected Northeast Oklahoma City in the Frontier City area, was also the most destructive. The tornado touched down near the Hefner Road/Bryant Avenue intersection before going on to cause major structural damage to numerous businesses. At Frontier City, the tornado damaged vehicles in the parking lot and caused the exterior of a concrete-block building to partly collapse while simultaneously taking its roof off. Inflow into the tornado caused additional damage to nearby areas, and seventeen injuries occurred at the park. East of Interstate 35, a Texaco suffered significant damage, and the tornado lifted and rolled empty semi-truck trailers in the parking lot. A nearby portable building was completely blown away. In the Nottingham and Quail Ridge Run subdivisions, extensive damage was caused to homes' windows, roofs, and garage doors. Some of these homes suffered a significant degree of roof failure despite having still-standing exterior walls. Anchoring between the roofs of these homes and their walls was missing, and it is possible that the intensity of the tornado was near the F3 range in these areas. The tornado caused $1 million worth of damage in North Oklahoma City throughout its track.

Overall, the outbreak caused a single injury in Longdale, Blaine County, in addition to 21 relatively minor injuries in Oklahoma County, largely at Frontier City. No fatalities occurred due to any of the tornadoes. After the event ended, Oklahoma Gas & Electric said that 25,000 to 30,000 had lost power. Part of the North Oklahoma City area was closed to nonresidents, and the Red Cross set up an emergency shelter at a church in the vicinity to help those in need.

== List of tornadoes ==
Confirmed tornadoes by Fujita rating
| FU | F0 | F1 | F2 | F3 | F4 | F5 | Total |
|---|---|---|---|---|---|---|---|
| 0 | 32 | 10 | 3 | 0 | 0 | 0 | 45 |

List of tornadoes on June 13, 1998 (Note: All dates are based on the local time zone where the tornado touched down; however, all times are in Coordinated Universal Time for consistency.)
| F# | Location | County | State | Start Coord. | Time (UTC) | Path length | Max width | Summary | Ref |
|---|---|---|---|---|---|---|---|---|---|
| F0 | N of Douglas | Converse | WY | 43.23°N 105.37°W | 1740–1742 | 0.2 mi (0.32 km) | 10 yd (9.1 m) | A short-lived tornado occurred northeast of Bill, Wyoming. | |
| F0 | W of Sidney | Cheyenne | NE | 41.15°N 105.57°W | 2047–2049 | 0.1 mi (0.16 km) | 10 yd (9.1 m) | A short-lived tornado touched down 30 miles west of Sidney. | |
| F0 | N of Torrington–NE of Torrington | Goshen | WY | 42.57°N 104.18°W | 2057–2117 | 4 mi (6.4 km) | 15 yd (14 m) | An east-moving tornado north of Torrington affected open country. | |
| F1 | NE of Kelly–S of Kelly | Bladen | NC | 34.52°N 78.27°W | 2015–2017 | 0.3 mi (0.48 km) | 25 yd (23 m) | A brief tornado crossed North Carolina Highway 210 between Colly Creek and Rowan Community. | |
| F0 | SE of Atkinson | Pender | NC | 34.48°N 78.10°W | 2021–2023 | 0.1 mi (0.16 km) | 20 yd (18 m) | A short-lived tornado's touchdown was viewed from Moore's Creek National Battlefield. | |
| F1 | Near Kelly | Bladen | NC | 34.47°N 78.33°W | 2025–2030 | 2 mi (3.2 km) | 25 yd (23 m) | A tornado destroyed two trailers and unroofed a third on Lightwood Knot Road before knocking over a tree and taking power offline on White Oak Road. | |
| F1 | SE of Sundance | Crook County | WY | 44.30°N 104.25°W | 2230–2237 | 1.5 mi (2.4 km) | 20 yd (18 m) | A tornado damaged a three-car garage, a home satellite dish, and numerous campers and bam roofs. | |
| F0 | W of Longdale | Blaine | OK | 36.13°N 98.57°W | 2145 | 0.1 mi (0.16 km) | 10 yd (9.1 m) | The Blaine County Sheriff reported a short-lived tornado just west of Longdale. The tornado injured a child and damaged numerous trees before lifting. | |
| F0 | NW of Thornburg | Smith | KS | 36.13°N 98.57°W | 2200–2202 | 0.5 mi (0.80 km) | 20 yd (18 m) | A short-lived tornado near the Kansas/Nebraska border touched down near Thornburg and caused minor damage before lifting. | |
| F0 | Near Leland | Brunswick | NC | 34.25°N 78.05°W | 2102–2104 | 0.1 mi (0.16 km) | 10 yd (9.1 m) | A short-lived tornado touched down at Magnolia Greens golf course. | |
| F0 | S of Belle Plaine | Sumner | KS | 37.33°N 97.23°W | 2235 | 0.5 mi (0.80 km) | 55 yd (50 m) | A brief tornado damaged some outbuildings. | |
| F1 | SW of Elwood–NE of Elwood | Gosper | NE | 40.58°N 99.87°W | 2240–2255 | 7 mi (11 km) | 75 yd (69 m) | See #Nebraska for information on this tornado | |
| F1 | SSW of Maxwell–WSW of Maxwell | Lincoln | NE | 41.02°N 100.57°W | 2245–2253 | 4 mi (6.4 km) | 75 yd (69 m) | A tornado was sporadically on the ground from southwest to west of Maxwell. It struck the Maranatha Bible Camp, knocking down about 160 trees and damaging nearby vehicles. The tornado went on to cross Interstate 80 before blowing down two billboards. The tornado struck a house just north of I-80 where it destroyed a camper, and it went on to cause minor damage to another home before finally lifting. | |
| F0 | Near Elmdale | Chase | KS | 38.37°N 96.63°W | 2250 | 0.5 mi (0.80 km) | 55 yd (50 m) | A tornado was sighted by a trained spotter. | |
| F0 | ESE of North Platte Airport | Lincoln | NE | 41.12°N 100.67°W | 2256 | —N/a | —N/a | A short-lived tornado touched down in open country. | |
| F0 | W of Brady | Lincoln | NE | 41.03°N 100.38°W | 2302 | —N/a | —N/a | A short-lived tornado touched down in open country. | |
| F0 | N of Bostwick | Nuckolls | NE | 40.08°N 98.18°W | 2308–2309 | 0.5 mi (0.80 km) | 20 yd (18 m) | Law enforcement reported a tornado north of Bostwick. | |
| F0 | SE of Odessa–E of Odessa | Buffalo | NE | 40.68°N 90.23°W | 2325–2327 | 1 mi (1.6 km) | 25 yd (23 m) | A short-lived tornado touched down one mile southeast of Odessa. | |
| F0 | W of Burden–Burden | Cowley | KS | 37.32°N 96.77°W | 2329–2333 | 1 mi (1.6 km) | 110 yd (100 m) | A short-lived tornado caused minor damage to some houses on the south side of Burden. | |
| F0 | N of Belleville | Republic | KS | 39.95°N 97.63°W | 2338 | 0.2 mi (0.32 km) | 200 yd (180 m) | A short-lived tornado touched down in open country. | |
| F1 | SW of Guthrie | Logan | OK | 35.85°N 97.47°W | 2343–2346 | 2 mi (3.2 km) | 50 yd (46 m) | A tornado touched down three miles southwest of Guthrie and went on to cause shingle and siding damage to two house before breaking windows and a porch post and damaging the roof of a third. The hood was torn off a pickup truck, a barn had its roof taken off, fences sustained damage, and an outbuilding was destroyed. | |
| F0 | E of Chester–SE of Chester | Thayer | NE | 40.02°N 97.60°W | 2345–2347 | 1 mi (1.6 km) | 25 yd (23 m) | A tornado traveled from east to southeast of Chester. It damaged a farmstead where most damage was limited to two outbuildings. At least 25 center irrigation pivots "were lost to the storm". | |
| F0 | SW of Callaway | Custer | NE | 41.28°N 99.97°W | 2350 | —N/a | —N/a | A short-lived tornado touched down in open country. | |
| F0 | WNW of El Reno | Canadian | OK | 35.57°N 98.05°W | 0015 | 0.2 mi (0.32 km) | 10 yd (9.1 m) | A short-lived tornado touched down in open country. | |
| F0 | NW of El Reno | Canadian | OK | 35.57°N 98.02°W | 0017–0022 | 0.2 mi (0.32 km) | 15 yd (14 m) | A short-lived tornado touched down in open country. | |
| F0 | WNW of Yukon | Canadian | OK | 35.52°N 97.78°W | 0045 | 0.1 mi (0.16 km) | 30 yd (27 m) | A storm chaser spotted a tornado touching down in an open field. | |
| F0 | S of Oakland | Marion | AR | 36.38°N 92.57°W | 0048 | 0.1 mi (0.16 km) | 50 yd (46 m) | A short-lived tornado touched down near Oakland and caused little if any damage. | |
| F0 | N of St. Benedict | Nemaha | KS | 39.98°N 96.10°W | 0100 | 0.1 mi (0.16 km) | 25 yd (23 m) | A spotter reported that a short-lived tornado touched down in open country. | |
| F1 | Near Oklahoma City | Oklahoma | OK | 35.48°N 97.53°W | 0102–0103 | 0.8 mi (1.3 km) | 50 yd (46 m) | See #Oklahoma City area tornadoes for information on this tornado | |
| F1 | Near Oklahoma City | Oklahoma | OK | 35.48°N 97.53°W | 0107–0108 | 0.8 mi (1.3 km) | 50 yd (46 m) | See #Oklahoma City area tornadoes for information on this tornado | |
| F2 | WSW of Nichols Hills–SE of Nichols Hills | Oklahoma | OK | 35.55°N 97.55°W | 0108–0111 | 1.5 mi (2.4 km) | 75 yd (69 m) | See #Oklahoma City area tornadoes for information on this tornado | |
| F2 | Near Oklahoma City | Oklahoma | OK | 35.48°N 97.53°W | 0112–0123 | 5.5 mi (8.9 km) | 200 yd (180 m) | See #Northeast Oklahoma City tornado for information on this tornado | |
| F1 | W of Bern | Nemaha | KS | 39.97°N 96.12°W | 0119–0125 | 4 mi (6.4 km) | 450 yd (410 m) | A storm chaser reported that a tornado touched down in open country and remained on the ground for four miles. Assessment was difficult due to lack of damage to structures or trees. | |
| F0 | W of Bern | Nemaha | KS | 39.97°N 96.02°W | 0130 | 0.1 mi (0.16 km) | 25 yd (23 m) | A storm chaser reported that a short-lived tornado touched down in open country. | |
| F0 | NW of Berwick | Nemaha | KS | 39.97°N 95.87°W | 0135 | 1.5 mi (2.4 km) | 50 yd (46 m) | Reports from a storm chaser and law enforcement signified that two tornadoes touched down near Berwick. The first of these tornadoes was short-lived. | |
| F0 | NW of Berwick | Nemaha | KS | 39.97°N 95.85°W | 0140 | 2 mi (3.2 km) | 50 yd (46 m) | Reports from a storm chaser and law enforcement signified that two tornadoes touched down near Berwick. The second of these tornadoes touched down four times along a two-mile path. | |
| F0 | N of Sabetha | Nemaha | KS | 39.93°N 95.78°W | 0143 | 1 mi (1.6 km) | 100 yd (91 m) | A short-lived tornado touched down in open country north of Sabetha. | |
| F0 | N of Sabetha | Nemaha | KS | 39.95°N 95.78°W | 0144 | 0.1 mi (0.16 km) | 20 yd (18 m) | A short-lived tornado touched down in open country north of Sabetha. | |
| F1 | W of Morrill | Brown | KS | 39.93°N 95.72°W | 0155 | 0.2 mi (0.32 km) | 50 yd (46 m) | Emergency management reported that a short-lived tornado touched down in open country and downed numerous large trees. | |
| F0 | Near Henderson | Baxter | AR | 36.37°N 92.23°W | 0200 | 0.1 mi (0.16 km) | 50 yd (46 m) | A short-lived tornado touched near Henderson and damaged a houseboat and marina dock. | |
| F0 | SW of Reserve | Brown | KS | 39.95°N 95.60°W | 0200 | 0.1 mi (0.16 km) | 25 yd (23 m) | A sheriff reported a short-lived tornado in open country. | |
| F0 | S of Bern | Nemaha | KS | 39.88°N 95.97°W | 0300 | 0.1 mi (0.16 km) | 25 yd (23 m) | Nemaha County sheriff reported a short-lived tornado. | |
| F2 | Sabetha | Nemaha | KS | 39.90°N 95.78°W | 0322 | 1 mi (1.6 km) | 100 yd (91 m) | See #Kansas for information on this tornado | |
| F0 | S of Western | Saline | NE | 40.37°N 97.20°W | 0350 | 0.5 mi (0.80 km) | 50 yd (46 m) | A tornado uprooted large trees and damaged a fence. | |
| F0 | N of Hiawatha | Brown | KS | 39.90°N 95.53°W | 0355 | 0.1 mi (0.16 km) | 25 yd (23 m) | A sheriff reported a short-lived tornado in open country. | |

== See also ==
- 1999 Oklahoma tornado outbreak
