= J. B. Moraes =

Indian poet and writer (1933–2014)

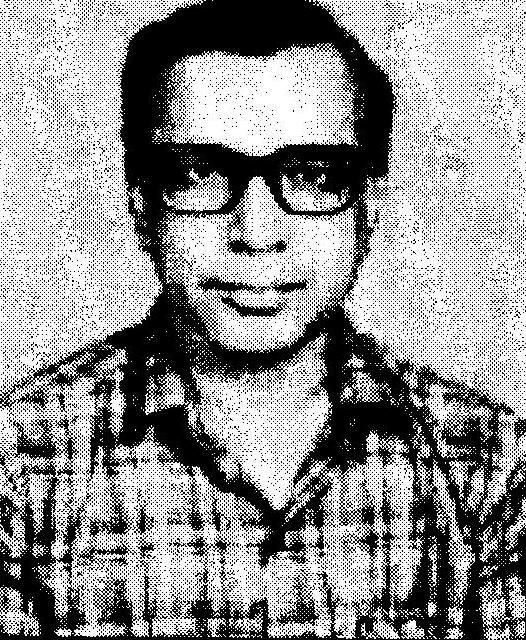
- Born: John Baptist Moraes; 29 June 1933; Niddodi, Kingdom of Mysore, British India
- Died: 30 December 2014 (aged 81); Mumbai, Maharashtra, India
- Children: 4
- Awards: Sahitya Akademi Award; Sandesha Prathistan Literary Award

John Baptist Moraes (29 June 1933 – 30 December 2014), better known as J. B. Moraes, was an Indian Konkani poet and writer. Over his literary career, he wrote poetry, short stories, plays, translation, and biographical literature, covering multiple genres. He was awarded the Sahitya Akademi Award in 1985 for his poetry collection Bhitarlem Tufan.

He was based in Bombay, which he migrated to in 1951 and wrote in Konkani in the Kannada script. He was also the founder and co-editor of the Konkani Daiz (Konkani Traditions) monthly, he was on the editorial board of the Poinnari (The Observer) weekly, and in 2002 was appointed member of the General Council of the Sahitya Akademi, India's academy of letters.

== Early and personal life ==
John Baptist Moraes was born on 29 June 1933 to a middle-class family in a village called Kallamundkur (also known as Niddodi) near Mangalore. His father, Benjamin Moraes, worked as a schoolteacher in their village.

He received his primary education at Little Flower School in his native village and subsequently attended Pompei High School in Kirem. After completing his matriculation, he relocated to Bombay in 1951 for employment, where he secured a position at the pharmaceutical company Parke-Davis. As of 1999, he still worked there.

On 23 May 1957, he married Matilda Pinto. The couple has four sons.

== Literary career ==
Moraes developed an interest in writing poetry during his childhood. While still a student, his Konkani poems written in the Kannada script were published in local Konkani periodicals.

After moving to Bombay, he wrote his first book in 1954, a Konkani translation of William Shakespeare's play Romeo and Juliet, published by the Konkani Prachar Mandal. Between 1958 and 1959, he served as an editor for the periodicals Reader's Digest and Konkani Daiz. Beginning in 1961, his poems, short stories, and broadcasts featured regularly on the Bombay station of Akashvani.

From 1964 to 1976, Moraes served on the advisory board of the Bombay-based Konkani weekly Poinari. Through Poinari, he published several translations of Western and regional literature, including Nisarallyak Lotun Ghalo (1974), Bolpya Modli Sheli (1976), Antya Naslle'm Svapan (1978), a serialized translation of K. Shivaram Karanth's Kannada novel Choma's Drum (Chomana Dudi); and Jerlo Games Aani Vatis Shenoy.

In 1977, Moraes published his first poetry collection, Novi Vhokol, which was edited by Fr. William Silva and published by Pragati Prakashan in Mangalore. In 1980, his short story collection Koshedtan Kello Khun, containing seven stories, was published by Raknno Prakashan and received an award from the Konkani Bhasha Mandal, Goa. He published Mangalurchi Ujval Ratna in 1983 through Punov Prakashan, profiling eight prominent Christian figures in Dakshina Kannada across the fields of literature, social service, and medicine.

In 1984, Moraes released the poetry collection Bhitarlem Tufan, edited by Swami Supriyan. Containing 28 poems, the work was awarded the Sahitya Akademi Award. In 1989, his Konkani translation of R. S. Mugali's book History of Kannada Literature was published by the Sahitya Akademi under the title Kannada Sahityacho Itihas. That same year, he began serializing his epic narrative poem Divyamrit—based on events and stories from the Bible—in the weekly publication Raknno.

In 1990, Saraswat Prakashan in Goa published his collection of one-act plays, Futifarachi Bayal, in the Devanagari script. One of his poems, Bhagi Mhajo Ganv, was included in the 9th-grade Konkani textbook curriculum in Goa.

== Organizational involvement and honours ==
Moraes served as the General Secretary of the Konkani Bhasha Mandal in Bombay and was a member of the advisory board for the Mangalore-based weekly publication Raknno. He was also involved with the activities of the Sahitya Akademi and several other literary bodies.

On 16 and 17 January 1993, Moraes presided as the President of the 15th All India Konkani Parishad held in Madgaon, Goa.

He has written a monograph of the Konkani poet C. F. D'Costa for the Sahitya Akademi under the series 'Makers of Indian Literature'. He has also translated History of Kannada Literature for Sahitya Akademi. As a journalist, Moraes has a long experience of over 45 years in working with the various Konkani periodicals.

=== Reviving KBM-Mumbai ===
Moraes was elected President of the 19th Session of the All India Konkani Parishad held in Margao, Goa, in January 1993. Mr. Moraes was an instrumental in reviving the oldest representative body of Konkanis Konkani Bhasha Mandal, Mumbai, in 1992. He was its General Secretary since 1992. He was a member of the General Council and Konkani Advisory Board of the Sahitya Akademi. He was also Convener of the Konkani Advisory Committee of the Bharatiya Jnanpith.

In the year 2024, his long essay was translated into English (by KonkaniWorld.com of Ullas de Souza in Dubai), upgraded and edited to include and updated (by Pratap Naik SJ) and published as part of the 25th anniversary commemorative volume of 'Sod" (Search), the journal of the Thomas Stephens Konknni Kendr at Alto Porvorim in Goa.

== Awards and accolades ==
- Sahitya Akademi Award (1985), for his poetry collection Bhitarlem Tufan
- Maharashtra Gaurav Puraskar (1 December 1990) – awarded by the Government of Maharashtra, including a cash prize of ₹1,00,000, for contributions to Konkani literature
- "Kaviraj" title (27 January 1991) – conferred by the Kalasagar organization, Bombay

He has also received honours and recognitions from organizations including the Konkani Sabha, Raknno, Konkani Porjechi Jamat, Parke-Davis, Karnataka Sangh, and Konkani Parab.

He received the Sandesha Prathistan Literary Award in the year 2000.

== Death ==
Moraes died on 30 December 2014 at the age of 81.

== Works ==
=== Poems ===
- Novi Vhokal, 1977
- Bhitorlem Tufan, 1984
- Ek Dhent, Ek Paan, 2002

=== Short stories ===
- Kosheddan Kelli Khun, 1980

=== Plays ===
- Sopann-Parki Zuze, 2002

=== Verse ===
- Putipharachi Bail, 1990

=== Life sketches ===
- Mongllurchim Ujwal Ratna, 1983

=== Monograph ===
- Cha Fra DaCosta, 2001

=== Translations into Konkani ===
- Romeo-Juliet, 1954 (Play)
- Ontya Nashillem Sopann, 1975 (Novel)
- Novem Poinn, 2OO1
- Kannada sahityacho Itihas, 1989 (Literary History)

=== Adaptations ===
- Nisralleak Lotun Ghalo, 1976 (Novel)
- Bolpyam Modhli Sheli, 1977 (Novel)
- Zorlo Gomes, 1987 (Sherlock Holmes Stories)

=== Serialized epic poem ===
- Divyamrut, 1989

=== In English collaboration ===
- History of Konkani Literature, 2000

=== Contributions of articles ===
- Masterpieces of Indian Literature, 1997
