= Thumbe =

Thumbe Thumbay
- village
- Location in Karnataka, India
- Coordinates: 12.87°N 74.98°E
- Country: India
- State: Karnataka
- District: Dakshina Kannada
- Nearest City: Mangalore

Population (2001)
  - Total: 5,558

Languages
  - Official: Tulu, Kannada, Beary
- Time zone: UTC+5:30 (IST)

Thumbe is a census town in Dakshina Kannada district in the Indian state of Karnataka. Thumbe in Kannada literally means a minute white flower without any fragrance but considered extremely auspicious for worship of Shiva.

== Demographics ==
As of 2001 India census, Thumbe had a population of 5558. Males constitute 50% of the population and females 50%. Thumbe has an average literacy rate of 73%, higher than the national average of 59.5%: male literacy is 80%, and female literacy is 67%. In Thumbe, 12% of the population is under 6 years of age.
