= Saratchandra Shenoi =

Indian writer (born 1953)

- Born: 23 March 1953 (age 73) Cochin, Kerala, India
- Occupation: Poet, translator, academic
- Language: Konkani, Malayalam, Sanskrit, English, Hindi
- Notable works: Antarnad (poetry collection)
- Notable awards: Sahitya Akademi Award

Saratchandra Shenoi (born 23 March 1953) is an Indian writer of Konkani language from Kerala. He is recognized for his contributions across various literary genres, including poetry, short stories, children's literature, and translations. Shenoi was honoured with the Sahitya Akademi Award for his Konkani poetry collection, Antarnad.

== Early life and education ==
Saratchandra Shenoi was born on 23 March 1953 in Ernakulam, Kerala. He is the youngest son of A. V. Raghunath Shenoi and Kanakabai. He pursued a Bachelor of Science (B.Sc.).

== Career ==
Shenoi started writing in 1974, writing in both Konkani and Malayalam. He gained prominence as a 'Konkani Poet' through his regular contributions to the popular Kerala-based periodical Konkan Janata.

As of 1999, he was employed by Canara Bank.

As of 2000, he was the Joint Secretary of the Kerala Konkani Akademi.

=== Notable works and translations ===
His literary works include:

- Antarnad: A collection of his Konkani poems published in 1997. The work explores themes of life and death, human struggle, and personal experiences.
- Meera: Jeevan ani Kavan: A Konkani translation of sixty compositions by Saint Mirabai, published in 1987.
- Sahitya Sankalan: A 1995 compilation featuring the works of eleven contemporary Konkani writers and poets from Kerala, published by the Kerala Konkani Academy.
- Kavyodyan: An edited anthology of Konkani poetry from Kerala, featuring works by thirty-five poets.
- Saga of The Uprooted: Translated from the Konkani
- Oh! My Brother from Kashmir

He also translated several Krishnastuti poems under the guidance of researcher P. B. Janardhan in Chennai in 1987.

== Awards and recognition ==
Shenoi has received several accolades for his literary work:

- Sahitya Akademi Award: He was honored with this national award in 1999 for his poetry collection Antarnad.
- Devaki Krishna Trust Award: Conferred by the Konkani Language Institute, Kochi, in 1991.
