= Pandurang Bhangui =

Indian poet and translator (1923–2008)

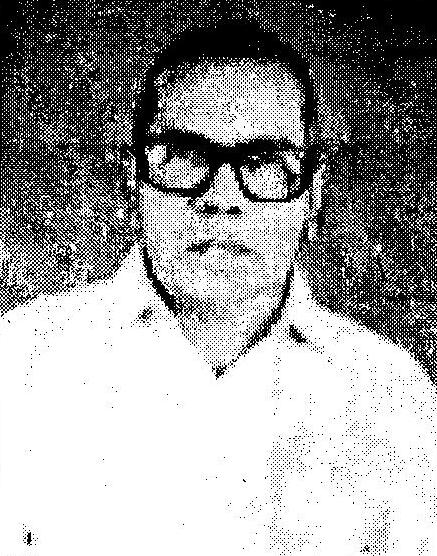
- Born: 13 August 1923; Kundaim, Portuguese Goa
- Died: 13 November 2008 (aged 85)
- Occupations: Poet, translator
- Writing career
- Notable work: Champhel'li Sanj
- Notable awards: Sahitya Akademi Award (2000)

Pandurang Rajaram Sinai Bhangui (13 August 1923 – 7 November 2008) was a Konkani poet, translator, and folklorist from Goa. He is known for his contributions to Konkani literature, particularly through his poetry collections and translations of world literature. Following a career in the Department of Customs and Excise, Bhangi dedicated his later years to compiling a Konkani dictionary.

== Early life ==
Bhangi was born on 13 August 1923 in Kundai, Goa. He completed his primary education in the Portuguese medium.

His transition into Konkani literature began during a picnic at Kirloskarwadi. During the event, S. V. Kirloskar remarked to the group that their Marathi would improve at Kirloskarwadi. This comment led Bhangi to the realization that his true language was Konkani, not Marathi, and he subsequently decided to dedicate his work to the Konkani language.

== Career ==
Bhangi was employed by the Department of Customs and Excise. His work required him to live in various locations outside of Goa, including Daman and Diu, and Mumbai.

== Literary work ==
Bhangi began writing in early 1945, though he took a brief hiatus shortly after starting. He also studied folklore and published various folk tales and poems throughout his career.

=== Poetry ===
Bhangi is regarded as a prominent poet in the Konkani language. His poetry is noted for its introverted nature ("introversion is the mainstay of his poetry") and the utilization of ancient vocabulary. His literary influences included Manuel Bandeira, Cecília Meireles, Almeida Garrett, Fernando Pessoa, Stefan Zweig, Romain Rolland, and Rabindranath Tagore.

His notable collections of poetry include Dishtavo, Adrishtache Kale and Champhel'li Sanj. The latter won him the Sahitya Akademi Award in 2000.

=== Translations ===
Bhangi worked to translate prominent world literature into Konkani. His translated works include:

- Yedip Raja (a translation of Sophocles' King Oedipus)
- Rabindranath Tagore's play Chitra
- Oscar Wilde's play Salome
- Mohan Rakesh's Hindi play Ashadh Ka Ek Din

=== Lexicography ===
Following his retirement from government service, Bhangi focused on lexicography. He published the first volume of a Konkani dictionary, which provided a thorough study of the contexts and etymology behind the words. He continued work on subsequent volumes after the publication of the first.

== Philately ==
Bhangi was an avid philatelist with a specific interest in collecting stamps from Switzerland ("Swiss steppes") and other rare stamps. In 1986, he was awarded a gold medal by Goa Pex for his collection.

== Awards ==
Bhangi has received various awards for his literary contributions, including honours from:

- Kala Academy
- Konkani Bhasha Mandal
- The Kudchade Konkani Arts and Literature Center
- The Jesuit Anton Pereira Memorial Thomas Stephens Konknni Kendr Award
- Sahitya Akademi Award (2000)

== Death ==
Bhangui died on 7 November 2008 after a brief illness.
