= Nandkumar Kamat =

Indian scientist (born 1958)

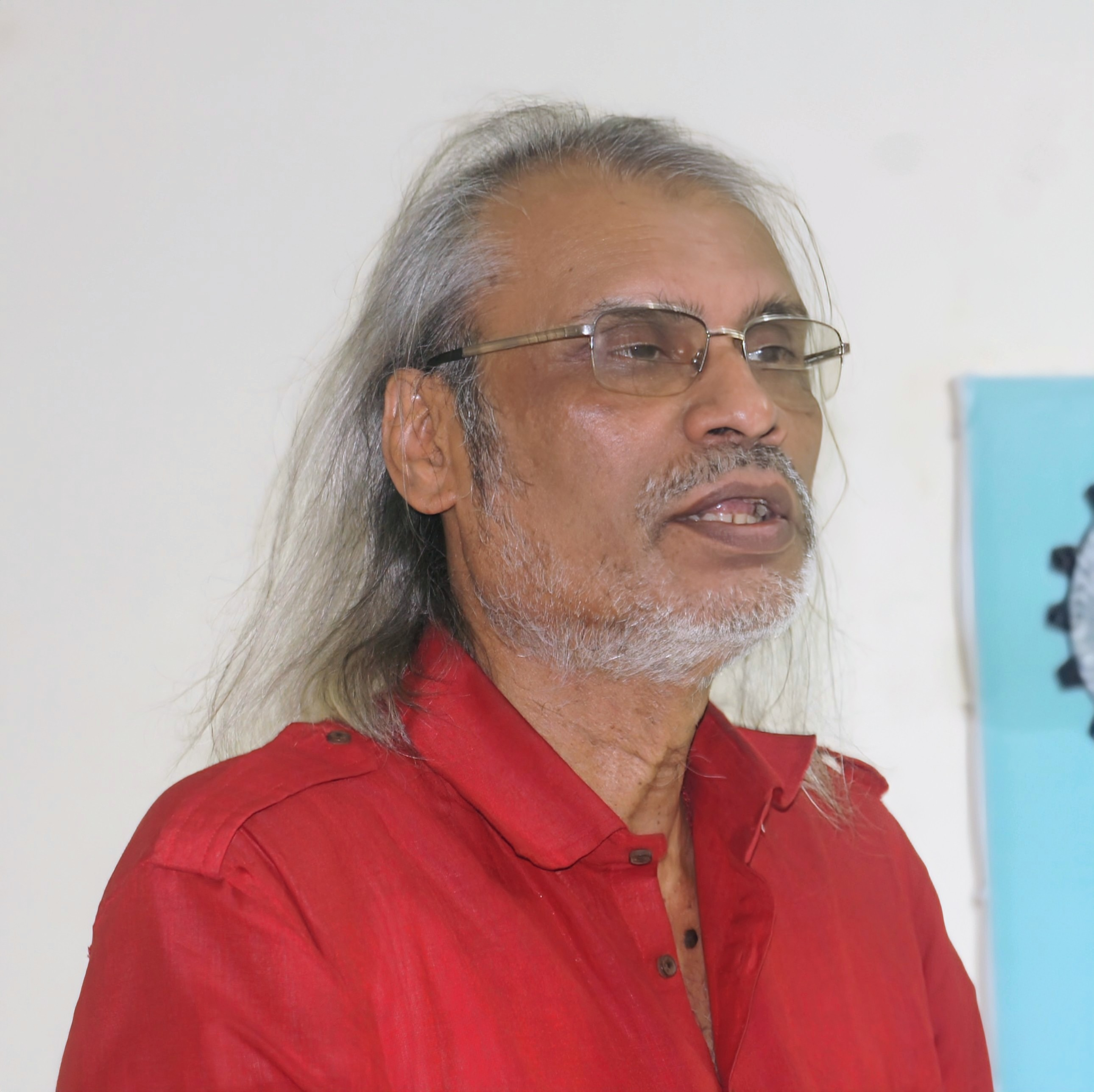
- Kamat in 2023
- Born: Nandkumar Mukund Kamat; 1958 (age 66–67); Goa
- Occupation(s): Scientist, writer

Nandkumar Mukund Kamat (born 1958) is an Indian scientist, researcher, writer, and academic known for his contributions in various fields, including mycology, environmental microbiology, and science popularization. He is associated with Goa University and has been recognized for his extensive work in ecology, anthropology, history, and the socio-economic aspects of Goan society.

== Early life ==
Nandkumar Mukund Kamat was born on 1958.

== Career ==
Kamat serves as an Assistant Professor in the Department of Botany at Goa University. His areas of expertise include plant sciences, mycology, biochemistry, fungal biotechnology, environmental microbiology, bioinformatics, environmental impact assessment, environmental education, science popularization, and public policy research.

He has been involved in research focusing on microbial diversity, particularly in unexplored tropical habitats, and has contributed to studies on chemolithotrophic and hyperacidophilic microorganisms, tropical actinobacteria, yeasts, micro and macrofungi. His work also includes bioprospecting for phosphorus-solubilizing microorganisms, pigments, enzymes, antibiotics, biogeochemistry, nanobiotechnology, biomining, biosensor development, fungal biotechnology, fruit wines, edible mushrooms, and sustainable ecotourism.

== Awards and accolades ==
In 1996, Kamat was awarded the Vincent Xavier Verodiano Award for his contributions to environmental conservation.

As of 2012, Kamat was a member of the Goa planning board. He submitted documents to the Supreme Court-appointed Centrally Empowered Committee regarding gold deposits in Goa, highlighting the presence of gold and heavy metals in the state's soil.

In 2018, the Goa Legislative Assembly unanimously passed a congratulatory motion commending Kamat for his contributions to ecology, anthropology, history, and the socio-economic life of the people. Then Chief Minister Manohar Parrikar and other members acknowledged his vocal stance on socio-cultural and heritage issues.

The same year, Kamat was selected for the first Biodiversity Conservation Award in North Goa (individual category) by the Goa State Biodiversity Board (GSBB). The award recognized his dedication to nature conservation.
