= First World Konkani Convention =

The First World Konkani Convention was held in Mangalore, Karnataka, India, from 16 to 22 December 1995.

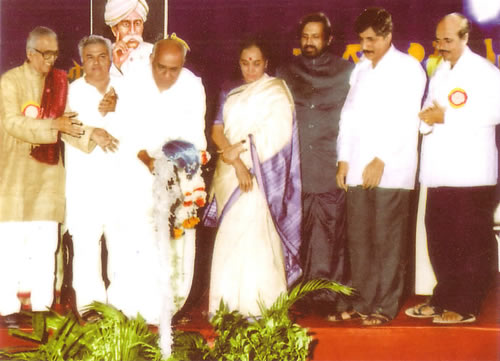
Inauguration of the First World Konkani Convention in 1995 by then Karnataka Chief Minister H.D. Deve Gowda in the presence of Union Ministers Margaret Alva and Suresh Kalmadi, State Ministers Shri R.V. Deshpande and K. Jayaprakash Hegde, N. Yogish Bhat, MLA, K.K. Pai and Chief Convener Basti Vaman Shenoy.

From 16 to 22 December 1995, the First World Konkani Convention was held in Mangalore under the auspices of Konkani Bhasha Mandal Karnatak, Konkani Activist and organiser Basti Vaman Shenoy was its chief convener. Margaret Alva, the then Central Minister was the Hon. Chairman, and K.K.Pai was the Chairman of the Organising Committee. 5000 Delegates from all over the world attended this Convention. The Convention bought together Konkani Speaking People from all regions, Religion, dialect and sub communities. The then Chief Minister of Karnataka H.D. Deve Gowda inaugurated the Convention. The seven days convention consisting of seminars, debates, cultural presentations, exhibition and food festival was a grand success. Basti Vaman Shenoy presented before the gathering of world representatives of Konkani People his dream to establish a permanent entity for the preservation and promotion of Konkani language, art and culture. The convention unanimously gave a mandate to establish World Konkani Centre in Mangalore vide a resolution in the valedictory function of the Convention.
