= Savoi-Verem =

Village in North Goa district, India

Coordinates: 15.480°N 74.020°E

Savoi-Verem is a village in the Ponda taluka, North Goa district in the Indian state of Goa.

== Area, population ==
According to the official 2011 Census, Savoi-Verem has an area of 928.62 hectares, a total of 700 households, a population of 3,187 (comprising 1,566 males and 1,621 females) with an under-six years population of 241 (comprising 117 boys and 124 girls).

== Location ==
In the close vicinity of Savoi-Verem is the Kundaim Industrial Estate (to its west). A number of prominent temples also surround the area.

== Recent issues ==
In December 2020, leopard sightings were reported in the village.

In December 2020 too, a water pumping station was promised for the village.

Savoi Verem was said to be the venue of illegal sand mining in December 2020.

== Landmarks in the village ==
- The Shri Madanant Temple is at Savoi-Verem, "surrounded by hills and fields, betel nuts, coconut and cashew nut trees. The temple is believed to be about 500 years old."
- The Ramanata Crisna Pai Raikar School Of Agriculture is based in Savoi-Verem.
- The Savoi Verem Spice Plantations is based in this village. Such spice farms are among the recent tourist attractions of Goa, where visitors encounter nature and spice plantations, together with traditional Hindu Goan food.

== Local jurisdiction ==
Savoi-Verem comes under the Verem-Vaghurme village panchayat or local council body.
