= C. F. D'Costa =

Indian writer (1931–1992)

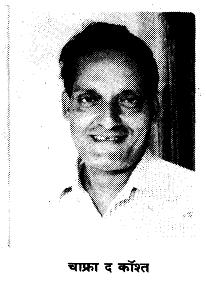
- Born: 10 October 1931; Marnamikatta, Mangalore, India
- Died: 1992 (aged 61)
- Writing career
- Language: Konkani
- Notable work: Soshyache Kan
- Notable awards: Sahitya Akademi Award (1989)

Charles Francis D'Costa (10 October 1931 – 1992), popularly known as Cha. Fra. D'Costa (or Cha. Fra.), was a Konkani poet, dramatist, and journalist from Mangalore.

== Early life ==
Charles Francis D'Costa was born in Mangalore on 10 October 1931 in the Rosario area (near Marnamikatta) as the eldest of four children of Madthabai and Marcel D’Costa. He did his primary education at St. John the Baptist School in Cascia and high school studies at Milagres High School. He left his formal studies in 1948.

He moved to Bombay in 1948 and worked in the Election Commission for the first general election of independent India. Later he became an employee of B.E.S.T.

== Career ==
=== Journalism ===
D'Costa began his writing career in the early days contributing to the paper Poinnari, which was edited by V. J. P. Saldanha. He later served as the editor of Poinnari around 1959. After leaving Poinnari in 1959, Cha. Fra. D'Costa started Konkani periodicals such as Zag-mag (1956), Vixal Konkonn (1961), Jivit (1983), and Udev (1976). As of 1999, he was the editor of Jivit. While most of his writing was in the Kannada script, he also contributed to Devanagari periodicals such as Rashtramat, Sunaparant, and Kulagar.

=== Literature and Theatre ===
He was a playwright who revolutionized Konkani theatre with his one-act plays. His plays were at par with European plays, in their substance and content. Though, many of his plays were adapted, some of them were better than the original. The lyrical beauty of his dialogues gave the plays a unique status of high quality. Because he was a progressive thinker, he questioned established values of religion and the state, through all his creative artistic expressions. His writings often utilized satire, irony, and humour to highlight flaws in society. His plays have been performed in Goa, Mangalore, Mumbai, and the Gulf countries. Several of his works originally in the Kannada script, such as Sunnem Mazor Hansta, Tornem Tornem Mornem, and Soshyache Kan, have been transliterated into the Devanagari script.

=== Activism and Music ===
D'Costa was instrumental in the establishment of the Mangalore Konkani Bhasha Mandal. He served as the President of the 9th All India Konkani Writer's Conference held in Sanquelim in 1987. His lyrics were featured in the musical program Mand Sobhan, which became popular from Mangalore to Goa. His songs were released on cassettes titled Rang Tarang and Mand Sobhan.

== Works ==
=== Plays ===
1. Sobit Sounsar (1955)
2. Sunnem Mazor Hansta (One-Act, 1977)
3. Tomato (One-Act)
4. Vishenticho Bhav (One-Act)
5. Tornem Tornem Mornem (Drama, 1973)
6. Poinnaryancho Mitr
7. Bhangar Monis
8. Jorji Buthel
9. Mankddacho Pai
10. Magirchem Magir
11. Boklaak Sat Ji:v
12. Kuvalyachi Val
13. Handdo uttla
14. Boncho Bandh
15. Dev Polleit Asa
16. Doro
17. Them Tho ani Hanv
18. Shirigundi Shimaon
19. Dakther Dusman
20. Jillacho Novro
21. Moja Puthacho Kinkulo
22. Rojik Kazar
23. Avnkwar Mesthri (1957)
24. Zuze Dayal
25. Macho

=== Stories and Biographies ===
1. Melle (Story, 1949)
2. Poinnaryancho Ixtt (Biography, 1954)

=== Poetry ===
1. Sonshayche Kan (published between 1986–88)

== Awards ==
He won the Central Sahitya Akademi Award in 1989 for his poetry collection Soshyache Kan.
