= Manohar Rai Sardesai =

Indian poet and translator (1925–2006)

Manohar Rai Sardessai
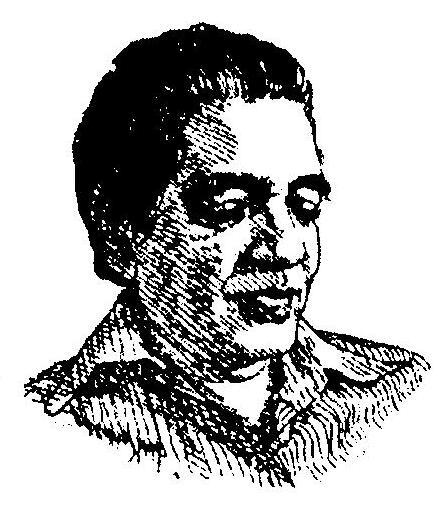
- Born: 18 January 1925
- Died: 22 June 2006 (aged 81)
- Education: Bombay University
- Relatives: Laxmanrao Sardessai (father)
- Writing career
- Language: Konkani
- Notable awards: Chevalier de l'Ordre des Palmes Académiques (1988); Sahitya Akademi Award (1980)

Manohar Rai Sardesai (18 January 1925 – 22 June 2006) was an Indian Konkani poet, writer and French translator. He received his Doctorat ès lettres françaises for his thesis "L'image de l'Inde en France" from the University of Sorbonne. He has been credited for an upsurge of modern Konkani poetry. Sardesai died in 2006.

== Early life ==
Manohar Rai Sardesai was born on 18 January 1925. He passed his matriculation examination in 1942 from the Bhatikar Model High School in Margão. He obtained a First Class First in Bachelor of Arts from the University of Bombay in 1947. He successfully completed his Master of Arts, also with the First Class First in French and in Marathi from the same university in 1949. He obtained his Doctorat ès lettres françaises in 1958 from the University of Sorbonne, Paris and taught French in Bombay at the University of Bombay and the University of Goa.

He was the son of the eminent short story writer Lakshmanrao Sardesai. Being surrounded by books, he started writing at an early age and was known for his very direct and penetrating Konkani poetry. Sardesai broadcast songs, poems, talks, plays and features on All India Radio in Panaji, Goa and Doordarshan in Bombay and Pune. He travelled all over Europe and India and wrote in Konkani, English, French, Portuguese and Marathi.

== Poems ==
Sardesai was a member of the executive board, Sahitya Akademi, representing Konkani, and also wrote for the National Book Trust of India. Notable collections of his poems are Ayj re dholar podli bodi (1961), Goema tujya mogakhatir (1964), Jayat jage (1964), Jay punnyabhui, jai Bharat (1965), Bebyachem kazar (1965), Jayo juyo (1970) and Pisollim (1979). He also edited an anthology of poems for the Sahitya Akademi, Delhi and published several works of prose, drama and children's literature. It was also Sardessai who introduced the two line poems called ‘tikli’.

== Translations ==
He translated many works from French into Konkani. The translations of "La Vie de Vivekananda" by Romain Rolland in 1994 (Vivekananda) and "Les Mots" by Jean-Paul Sartre in 2000 ("Utram"), comprise some of his works. He also produced the Konkani-English Dictionary in 2004 and was Chief Editor for the four-volume Konkani Encyclopedia, published by Goa University in 1999.

== Awards and honours ==
The French Government conferred him with the title "Chevalier de l'Ordre des Palmes Académiques" in 1988, in recognition of his services to the French language and culture. Dr. Sardesai also won many awards for his literary contributions and in the teaching profession. Most notable among the awards was the Sahitya Akademi, Delhi for Pisollim.

He chaired the 8th Session of the All India Konkani Parishad which was held at Margao, Goa on 26 and 27 May 1962 – the first of its kind after Goa was liberated from Portuguese rule on 19 December 1961, and later became president of Konkani Bhasha Mandal, Goa.

He was also a life member of "Alliance Française de Goa" and Founder President of the University Teachers' Association, Goa.
