= List of Sahitya Akademi Award winners for Sanskrit =

List of winners of a literary honor in India

Sahitya Akademi Award for Sanskrit
- Award for contributions to Sanskrit literature
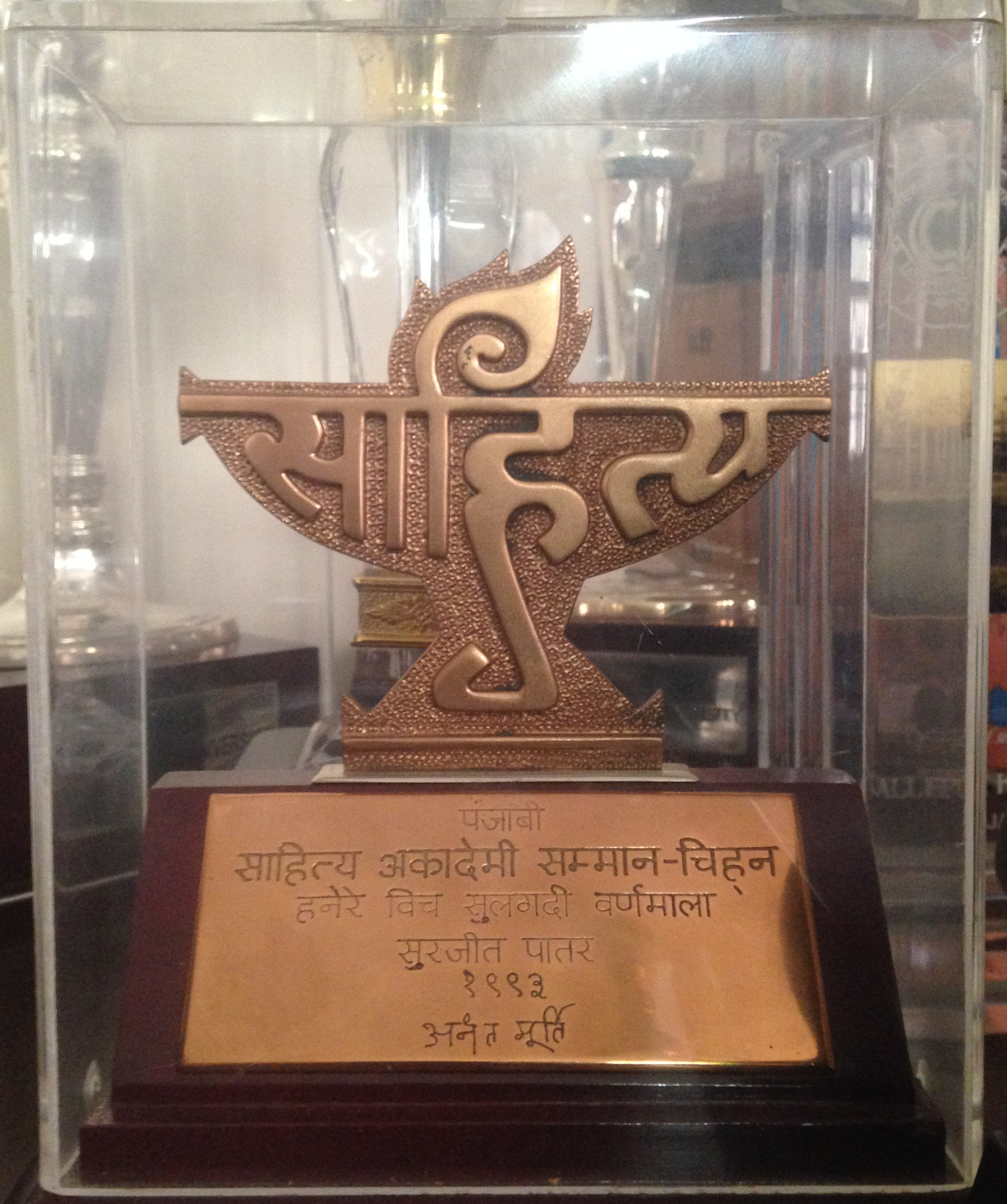
- Awarded for: Literary award in India
- Sponsored by: Sahitya Akademi, Government of India
- Reward: ₹1 lakh (US$1,100)
- First award: 1956
- Final award: 2024

Highlights
- Total awarded: 56
- First winner: P. V. Kane
- Most Recent winner: Dipak Kumar Sharma
- Website: Official website

Part of a series on

Sahitya Akademi Awards
Category
Sahitya Akademi Award winners by language
- Assamese
- Bengali
- Bodo
- Dogri
- English
- Gujarati
- Hindi
- Kannada
- Kashmiri
- Konkani
- Maithili
- Malayalam
- Marathi
- Meitei (Manipuri)
- Nepali
- Odia
- Punjabi
- Rajasthani
- Sanskrit
- Santali
- Sindhi
- Tamil
- Telugu
- Urdu
Sahitya Akademi Translation Prizes
- Assamese
- Bengali
- Bodo
- Dogri
- English
- Gujarati
- Hindi
- Kannada
- Kashmiri
- Konkani
- Maithili
- Malayalam
- Marathi
- Meitei (Manipuri)
- Nepali
- Odia
- Punjabi
- Rajasthani
- Sanskrit
- Santali
- Sindhi
- Tamil
- Telugu
- Urdu
Sahitya Akademi Yuva Puraskar
- Assamese
- Bengali
- Bodo
- Dogri
- English
- Gujarati
- Hindi
- Kannada
- Kashmiri
- Konkani
- Maithili
- Malayalam
- Meitei (Manipuri)
- Marathi
- Nepali
- Odia
- Punjabi
- Rajasthani
- Sanskrit
- Santali
- Sindhi
- Tamil
- Telugu
- Urdu
Sahitya Akademi Bal Sahitya Puraskar
- Assamese
- Bengali
- Bodo
- Dogri
- English
- Gujarati
- Hindi
- Kannada
- Kashmiri
- Konkani
- Maithili
- Malayalam
- Meitei (Manipuri)
- Marathi
- Nepali
- Odia
- Punjabi
- Rajasthani
- Sanskrit
- Santali
- Sindhi
- Tamil
- Telugu
- Urdu
Related
- Eighth Schedule to the Constitution of India
- Official Languages Commission
- List of languages by number of native speakers in India

The Sahitya Akademi Award is an annual award, given by the Sahitya Akademi (India's National Academy of Letters), to writers in 24 Indian languages. The award was instituted and first awarded in 1955. As of 2022, the award carries a monetary reward of ₹1 lakh (US$1,100), a shawl and a copper-plaque. The award for Sanskrit was first given in 1956. The first five awards went to works in other languages, dealing with Sanskrit culture. Since 1967, the award has been given only to works in Sanskrit. Below is the list of the recipients honoured for their Sanskrit language works.

== Sahitya Akademi Award winners for Sanskrit ==
Year	Portrait	Author	Book	Category
1956		P. V. Kane	History of Dharma Sastra, Vol. IV	Research
1961	—	Giridhar Sharma Chaturvedi	Vaidika vijñāna aura bhāratīya saṃskṛti	Research
1963		B. N. Krishnamurti Sharma	History of the Dvaita School of Vedanta and its Literature	Research
1964		Gopinath Kaviraj	Tāṃtrika vāṅmaya meṃ śākta dṛṣṭi	Treatise
1966	—	V. Raghavan	Bhoja's Sringara Prakasa	Aesthetics
1967	—	Ramaroop Pathak	Citrakāvya-kautukam	Poetry
1968		Satyavrat Shastri	śrīgurugovindasiṃhacaritam	Poetry
1970	—	V. Subramanya Sastri	śabdataraṅgiṇī	Treatise on verbal cognition
1973		M. S. Aney	śrītilakayaśonarṇava	Epic
1974	—	Dr. S.B. Warnekar	śrīśivarājyodayam	Epic poem
1977	—	Shanti Bhikshu Shastri	buddhavijayakāvyam	Poetry
1979		K.N. Ezhuthachan	keralodayaḥ	Epic
1980	—	P. C. Devassia	Kristubhagavatam	Epic
1981	—	Jagannath Pathak	kāpiśāyanī	Poetry
1982		P. K. Narayana Pillai	viśvabhānu	Epic
1983		Pandharinathacharya Galagali	śrī śaṃbhuliṃgavijaya caṃpū	Biography
1984	—	Shrinath S. Hasurkar	siṃdhu kanyāḥ	Historical novel
1985	—	Vasant Trimbak Shevde	vindhyavāsinivijayamahākāvyam:	Epic
1986	—	Kalika Prasad Shukla	śrīrādhācaritamahākāvyam	Epic
1987	—	Biswanarayan Shastri	avināśi	Novel
1988	—	Abhiraj Rajendra Mishra	ikṣugaṃdhā	Short stories
1989	—	Ram Karan Sharma	saṃdhyā	Poetry
1990	—	Ogeti Parikshit Sharma	śrīmatpratāparāṇāyanaṃ mahākāvyam	Poetry
1991		Rewa Prasad Dwivedi	svātaṃtryasaṃbhavam	Poetry
1992	—	Hari Narayan Dikshit	bhīṣmacaritam	Epic
1993	—	Jaggu Alwar Iyengar	jayantīkagadyakāvya	Prose Romance
1994	—	Radhavallabh Tripathi	saṃdhānam	Poetry
1995	—	Rasik Vihari Joshi	śrīrādhāpaṃcaśatī	Poetry
1996	—	Keshab Chandra Dash	Isha	Poetry
1997	—	Shyam Dev Parashar	Triveni	Poetry
1998	—	Bachchoolal Awasthi	Pratanini	Poetry
1999	—	Srinivas Rath	Tadeva Gaganam Saivadhara	Poetry
2000	—	S. Srinivasa Sarma	Jagadguru Sri Chandrasekharendra - Saraswati Vijayam	Poetry
2001		Pullella Sriramachandrudu	Ko Vai Rasah	Essays
2002	—	Kashinath Mishra	Harsacarita-Manjari	Poetry
2003	—	Bhaskaracharya Tripathi	Nirjharini	Poetry
2004		Devarshi Kalanath Shastry	Akhyana Vallari	Fiction
2005		Swami Rambhadracharya	Sribhargavaraghaviyam	Epic
2006		Harshadev Madhav	Tava Sparshe Sparshe	Poetry
2007	—	Hari Dutt Sharma	Lasallatika	Poetry
2008	—	Om Prakash Pandey	Rasapriya-Vibhavanam	Poetry
2009	—	Prashasya Mitra Shastri	Anabheepsitam	Short stories
2010		Mithila Prasad Tripathi	Bharqviyam	Poetry
2011	—	Harekrishna Satapathy	Bharatayanam	Poetry
2012		Ramji Thakur	Laghupadyahprabandhatrayi	Poetry
2013	—	Radhakant Thakur	Chaladuravani	Poetry
2015	—	Ram Shankar Awasthi	Vanadevi	Epic
2016	—	Sitanath Acharya	Kavyanirjhari	Poetry
2017	—	Niranjan Mishra	Gangaputravadanam	Poetry
2018		Rama Kant Shukla	Mama Janani	Poetry
2019		Madhusudan Penna	Prajnachakshusham	Poetry
2020		Mahesh Chandra Sharma Gautam	Vaishali	Novel
2021	—	Vindeshwariprasad Mishra 'Vinay'	Srijati Shankhnadam Kil, Kavita	Poetry
2022	—	Janardan Prasad Pandey ‘Mani’	Deepmanikyam	Poetry
2023	—	Arun Ranjan Mishra	Shunye Meghaganam	Poetry
2024	—	Dipak Kumar Sharma	Bhaskaracaritam	Poetry
2025		Mahamahopadhyaya Sadhu Bhadreshdas	Prasthanacatustaye Brahmaghosah	Poetry

(No Awards in 1955, 1957, 1958, 1959, 1960, 1962, 1965, 1969, 1971, 1972, 1975, 1976, 1978 and 2014.)

== Bal Sahitya Puraskar ==
The Sahitya Akademi also awards a "Bal Sahitya Puraskar", for children's literature. Winners of this award for Sanskrit include:

Year	Author	Work	Notes
2010	Padma Sastry	Sanskrit-Katha-Satakam (in 2 Vols.)	Short Stories
2011	Abhiraja Rajendra Mishra	Kaumarm (poetry)	
2012	Om Prakash Thakur	Isap-Katha Nikunjam	Collection of short stories
2013	H. R. Vishvasa	Marjalasya Mukham Drishtam	Book of plays
2014	No award		
2015	Janardan Hegde	Balakathasaptatih	Stories
2016	Rishiraj Jani	Chamtkarikah Chaladurabhashah	Short story
2017	RajKumar Mishra	Dayate Kathamakashe	Poetry
2018	Sampadananda Mishra	Shanaih Shanaih	Poetry
2019	Sanjay Chaubey	Chitva Trinam Trinam	Poetry
2020	Aravind Kumar Tiwari	Balagunjanam	Poetry
2021	Asha Agrawal	Chitva Trinam Trinam	Short story
2022	Kuldeep Sharma	Sachitram Prahelikasatkam (Abhinavsanskritprahelikah)	Poetry
2023	Radhavallabh Tripathi	Manavi	Novel
2024	Harshadev Madhav	Bubhukshitah Kakah	Short story

== Yuva Puraskar ==
Books published by an author of the age of 35 and below.

Year	Author	Work	Notes
2017	Hemchandra Belwal	Parivartankavyam	Poetry
2018	Muni Rajsundar Vijay	Chitrakavyadarshanam	Poetry
2019	Yuvraj Bhattarai	Vagvilasini	Poetry
2020	Rishiraj Pathak	Aadhyonmeshah	Poetry
2021	Swetapadma Satapathy	Kathakalpalata	Short story
2022	Shruti Kanitkar	Shreemati Charitram	Poetry
2023	Madhusudan Mishra	Sudarshanvijayam	Prose
2024	TBD	TBD	

== Bhasha Samman ==
The Sahitya Akademi introduced the Bhasha Samman in 1996 to honor writers, scholars, and translators who have significantly contributed to unrecognized languages in India. It also acknowledges work in classical and medieval literature. Recipients receive a plaque and a monetary prize of ₹1,00,000.

Year	Author	Category
2017	Prof. Kamalesh Datta Tripathi	Classical and Medieval Literature

== Translation Prizes ==
Following is the list of recipients of Sahitya Akademi translation prizes for their works written in Sanskrit. The award, as of 2019, consisted of ₹50,000.

Year	Translator	Title of the translation	Original title	Original language	Genre	Original Author	References
1990	Ganesha Sharma	Vijananam Samajasca	Vijnana Aur Samaja	Hindi	Treatise	Sarayu Prasad Gupta	
1991	Mallikarjun Paraddi	Satikam Kabirdasashatakam	Kabir Dohavali	Hindi	Couplets	Kabir	
1993	Amir Chandra Shastri	Nehrucarita Mahakavyam	Autobiography	English	Biography	Jawaharlal Nehru	
1994	Kashinath Mishra	Vidyapati Shatakam	Vtdyapatt	Maithili	Poetry	Vidyapati	
1995	K.P. Narayana Pisharodi	Srikrishnacharitam Mahakavyam	Srikrishnacharitam Mahakavyam	Malayalam	Epic	Kunchan Nambiar	
1996	Kshirod Chandra Dash	Chilika	Chilika	Oriya	Poetry	Radhanath Ray	
1997	Shyam Vimal	Vyamoha	Vyamoha	Hindi	Novel	Shyam Vimal	
1998	Bihari Lal Mishra	Sharatsaptakam	Selection	Bengali	Short Stories	Sarat Chandra Chattopadhyay	
2000	Dipak Ghosh	Sanskritara-vindrasangitam	Collection	Bengali	Poetry	Rabindranath Tagore	
2001	R. Sri Hari	Prapanchapadi	Prapanchapadulu	Telugu	Poetry	C. Narayana Reddy	
2004	Jagannath Pathak	Ghaliba Kavyam	Diwan-e-Ghalib	Urdu	Poetry	Mirza Asadullah Khan Ghalib	
2005	Janardhan Hedge	Dharmasri	Dharmasri	Kannada	Novel	S. L. Bhyrappa	
2006	H.V. Nagaraja Rao	Sartha	Sartha	Kannada	Novel	S. L. Bhyrappa	
2007	Vishu Belani	Agni Sakshi	Agnisakshi	Malayalam	Novel	Lalithambika Antharjanam	
2008	A. V. Subramanian	Sringarapadyavali	Kuṟuntokai	Tamil	Poetry	Sangam Poets	
2009	Prem Narayan Dwivedi	Srimadramacharitamanasam	Ramcharitmanas	Awadhi	Epic Poem	Tulsidas	
2010	H. R. Vishwasa	Aavaranam	Aavarana	Kannada	Novel	S. L. Bhyrappa	
2011	K. Ramakrishna Variyer	Gitanjali	Gitanjali	Bengali	Poetry	Rabindranath Tagore	
2012	Bhagirathinanda	Bharatvarsham	Bharatvarsha	Odia	Poetry	Sitakant Mahapatra	
2013	Abhiraj Rajendra Mishra	Vijayaparva	Vijaya parva	Hindi	Play	Ramakumar Varma	
2014	Narayan Dash	Vatyasarah	Jhad O Anyanya Kahani	Odia	Short Stories	ChandraShekhara das Varma	
2015	Tarashankar Sharma 'Pandeya'	Ahmev Radha Ahmev Krishna	Mein Hi Radha Main Hi Krishna	Hindi	Poetry	Gulab Kothari	
2016	Rani Sadasiva Murty	Vivkatapuspakarandah	Ontari Pula Butta	Telugu	Poetry	Rallabandi Kavita Prasad	
2017	Praveen Pandya	Soundaryasrotarswini Narmada	Saundaryana Nadi Narmada	Gujarati	Travelogue	Amritlal Vegad	
2018	Dipak Kumar Sharma	Asama Vanmanjari	Asama Vanmanjari	Assamese	Poetry	Various Authors	
2019	Prem Shankar Sharma	Rashmirathi	Rashmirathi	Hindi	Poetry	Ramdhari Singh Dinkar	
2020	Manjusha Kulkarni	Prakashmargh	Prakashvata	Marathi	Biography	Prakash Aamate	
2021	Shatavadhani Ganesh & B. N. Shashikiran	Mahaabraahmanah	Mahabrahmana	Kannada	Novel	Devudu Narasimha Sastri	
2022	Gopabandhu Mishra	Amrutaphalam	AmrutaPhala	Odia	Novel	Manoj Das	
2023	Ruchiraah Baalakathaah	Nagaratna Hegde	Makkaligaagi Nanna Necchina Kathegalu	Kannada	Short Stories	Sudha Murty	
