= List of Sahitya Akademi Award winners for Rajasthani =

List of winners of a literary honor in India

Sahitya Akademi Award for Rajasthani
- Award for contributions to Literature
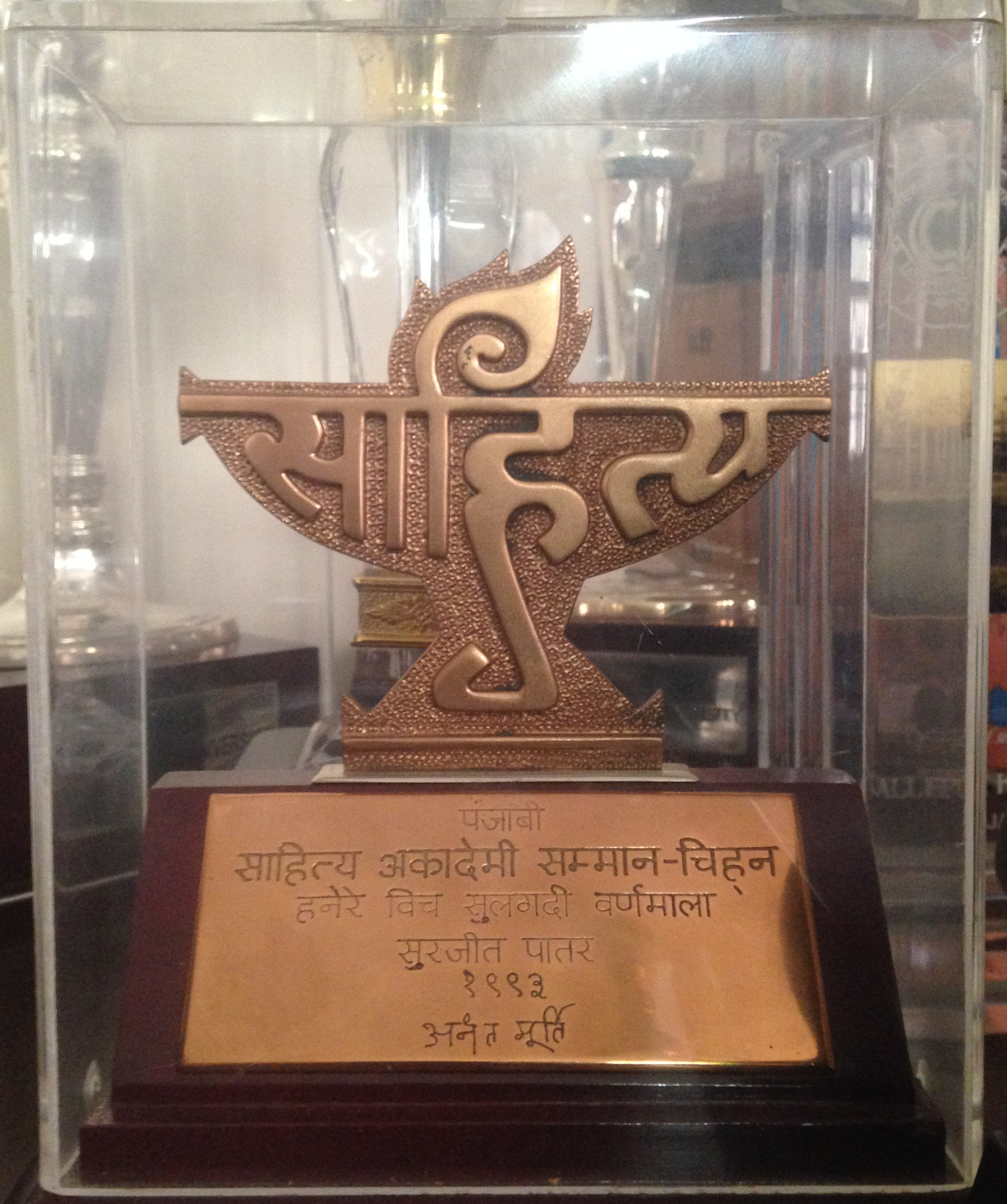
- Awarded for: Second-highest literary honour in India
- Sponsored by: Sahitya Akademi, Government of India
- Reward: ₹1 lakh (US$1,100)
- First award: 1974
- Final award: 2024

Highlights
- Total awarded: 51
- First winner: Vijaydan Detha
- Most Recent winner: Mukut Maniraj
- Website: sahitya-akademi.gov.in

Part of a series on

Sahitya Akademi Awards
Category
Sahitya Akademi Award winners by language
- Assamese
- Bengali
- Bodo
- Dogri
- English
- Gujarati
- Hindi
- Kannada
- Kashmiri
- Konkani
- Maithili
- Malayalam
- Marathi
- Meitei (Manipuri)
- Nepali
- Odia
- Punjabi
- Rajasthani
- Sanskrit
- Santali
- Sindhi
- Tamil
- Telugu
- Urdu
Sahitya Akademi Translation Prizes
- Assamese
- Bengali
- Bodo
- Dogri
- English
- Gujarati
- Hindi
- Kannada
- Kashmiri
- Konkani
- Maithili
- Malayalam
- Marathi
- Meitei (Manipuri)
- Nepali
- Odia
- Punjabi
- Rajasthani
- Sanskrit
- Santali
- Sindhi
- Tamil
- Telugu
- Urdu
Sahitya Akademi Yuva Puraskar
- Assamese
- Bengali
- Bodo
- Dogri
- English
- Gujarati
- Hindi
- Kannada
- Kashmiri
- Konkani
- Maithili
- Malayalam
- Meitei (Manipuri)
- Marathi
- Nepali
- Odia
- Punjabi
- Rajasthani
- Sanskrit
- Santali
- Sindhi
- Tamil
- Telugu
- Urdu
Sahitya Akademi Bal Sahitya Puraskar
- Assamese
- Bengali
- Bodo
- Dogri
- English
- Gujarati
- Hindi
- Kannada
- Kashmiri
- Konkani
- Maithili
- Malayalam
- Meitei (Manipuri)
- Marathi
- Nepali
- Odia
- Punjabi
- Rajasthani
- Sanskrit
- Santali
- Sindhi
- Tamil
- Telugu
- Urdu
Related
- Eighth Schedule to the Constitution of India
- Official Languages Commission
- List of languages by number of native speakers in India

The Sahitya Akademi Award is a literary honor in India awarded by the Sahitya Akademi, India's National Academy of Letters which aims at "promoting Indian literature throughout the world". The Akademi annually confers awards on writers and poets of "the most outstanding books of literary merit". The awards are given for works published in any of the 24 languages recognised by the akademi. Instituted in 1954, the award recognizes and promotes excellence in writing and acknowledge new trends. The annual process of selecting awardees runs for the preceding twelve months. The following is a list of winners of the Sahitya Akademi Award for writings in Rajasthani language.

== Recipients ==
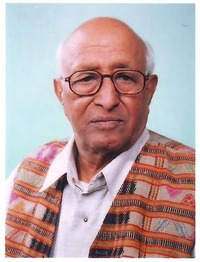
Vijaydan Detha was the first winner of this award.

Year	Recipients	Works	Genre
2025	Jitender Kumar Soni	Bharkhama	Short Story
2024	Mukut Maniraj	Gaon Ar Amma	Poetry
2023	Gaje Singh Rajpurohit	Palakati Preet	Poetry
2022	Kamal Ranga	Alekhun Amba	Play
2021	Meethesh Nirmohi	Mugtee	Poetry
2020	Dr. Bhanwar Singh Samaur	Sanskriti ri Sanatana Deeth	Essay collection
2019	Ramswaroop Kisan	Barik baat	Story collection
2018	Dr. Rajesh Kumar Vyas	Kavita Devai Deeth	Poetry
2017	Dr. Neeraj Daiya	Bina Hasalpai	Criticism
2016	Bulaki Sharma	Murdjat Ar Dujee Kahaniyan (Short Stories)	Short Stories
2015	Madhu Acharya 'Ashawadi'	Gawaad	Novel
2014	Rampal Singh Rajpurohit	Sundar Nain Sudha	Short Stories
2013	Ambika Dutt	Aanthyoi Nahi Din Hal	Poetry
2012	Aaidan Singh Bhati	Aankh Hinye Ra Haryal Sapana	Poetry
2011	Atul Kanak	Joon Jaatra	Novel
2010	Mangat Badal	Meera	Poetic epic
2009	Major Ratan Jangid	Mayee Eida Poot Jan	Short Stories
2008	Dinesh Panchal	Pagarva	Short Stories
2007	Kundan Mali	Aalochana Ree Aankh Sun	Criticism
2006	Laxmi Narayan Ranga	Poornamidam	Play
2005	Chetan Swami	Kisturi Mirag	Short Stories
2004	Namd Bhardwa	Samhi Khulto Marag	Novel
2003	Santosh Maya Mohan	Simaran	Poetry
2002	Bharat Ola	Jiv Ri Jaat	Poetry
2001	Abdul Vaheed `Kamal'	Gharano	Novel
2000	Jaya Prakash Pandya ‘Jyotipunj’	Kankoo Kabandh	Play
1999	Vasu Acharya	Seer Ro Ghar	Poetry
1998	Shanti Baradwaj ‘Rakesh’	Ud Ja Re Sua	Novel
1997	Malchand Tiwari	Utaryo Hai Abho	Poetry
1996	Nem Narayan Joshi	Olun Ri Akhiyatan	Memoirs
1995	Kishore Kalpanakant	Kookh Padyai Ree Peed	Poetry
1994	Karnidan Barhath	Mati Ri Mahak	Short Stories
1993	Nrisingh Rajpurohit	Adhura Supna	Short Stories
1992	Dr. Arjun Deo Charan	Dharam Judh	Play
1991	Premji Prem	Mhari Kavitavan	Poetry
1990	Rewatdan Charan `Kalpit'	Uchhalo	Poetry
1989	Yadavendra Sharma `Chandra'	Jamaro	Short Stories
1988	Bhagwati Lal Vyas	Anahad Naad	Poetry
1987	Nain Mal Jain	Saglonri Peeda Swatmegh	Poetry
1986	Mahaveer Prasad Joshi	Dwarka	Poetry
1985	Sanwar Daiya	Ek Duniya Mhari	Short Stories
1984	Sumer Singh Shekhawat	Maru-Mangal	Poetry
1983	Mohan Alok	Ga-Geet	Poetry
1982	Moolchand `Pranesh'	Chasmadith Gawah	Short Stories
1981	Narayan Singh Bhati	Barsan Ra Degoda Dungar Langhiyan	Poetry
1980	Rameshwar Dayal Shrimali	Mharo Gaon	Poetry
1979	Dr. Chandra Prakash Deval	Paagi	Poetry
1978	Anna Ram `Sudama'	Mevai Ra Runkh	Novel
1977	Satya Prakash Joshi	Bol Bharamli	Poetry
1976	Kanhaiyalal Sethia	Leeltans	Poetry
1975	Mani Madhukar	Pagfero	Poetry
1974	Vijaydan Detha	Batan Ri Phulwari Vol. X	Folk-tales
