= List of Sahitya Akademi Translation Prize winners for Bodo =

List of winners of a literary honor in India

Part of a series on

Sahitya Akademi Awards
Category
Sahitya Akademi Award winners by language
- Assamese
- Bengali
- Bodo
- Dogri
- English
- Gujarati
- Hindi
- Kannada
- Kashmiri
- Konkani
- Maithili
- Malayalam
- Marathi
- Meitei (Manipuri)
- Nepali
- Odia
- Punjabi
- Rajasthani
- Sanskrit
- Santali
- Sindhi
- Tamil
- Telugu
- Urdu
Sahitya Akademi Translation Prizes
- Assamese
- Bengali
- Bodo
- Dogri
- English
- Gujarati
- Hindi
- Kannada
- Kashmiri
- Konkani
- Maithili
- Malayalam
- Marathi
- Meitei (Manipuri)
- Nepali
- Odia
- Punjabi
- Rajasthani
- Sanskrit
- Santali
- Sindhi
- Tamil
- Telugu
- Urdu
Sahitya Akademi Yuva Puraskar
- Assamese
- Bengali
- Bodo
- Dogri
- English
- Gujarati
- Hindi
- Kannada
- Kashmiri
- Konkani
- Maithili
- Malayalam
- Meitei (Manipuri)
- Marathi
- Nepali
- Odia
- Punjabi
- Rajasthani
- Sanskrit
- Santali
- Sindhi
- Tamil
- Telugu
- Urdu
Sahitya Akademi Bal Sahitya Puraskar
- Assamese
- Bengali
- Bodo
- Dogri
- English
- Gujarati
- Hindi
- Kannada
- Kashmiri
- Konkani
- Maithili
- Malayalam
- Meitei (Manipuri)
- Marathi
- Nepali
- Odia
- Punjabi
- Rajasthani
- Sanskrit
- Santali
- Sindhi
- Tamil
- Telugu
- Urdu
Related
- Eighth Schedule to the Constitution of India
- Official Languages Commission
- List of languages by number of native speakers in India

Sahitya Akademi Translation Prizes are given each year to writers for their outstanding translations work in the 24 languages, since 1989. Sahitya Akademi Translation Prizes for Bodo language started in 2005.

== Recipients ==
Following is the list of recipients of Sahitya Akademi translation prizes for their works written in Bodo. The award, as of 2019, consisted of ₹50,000.

Year	Translator	Title of the translation	Original Title	Original Language	Genre	Original Author	Ref.
2005	Pramila Narzary	Abwini Solo	Buri Aair Sadhu	Assamese	Short Stories	Lakshinath Bezbarua	
2006	Rangina Daimary	Geder Habila	Uchchakangkha	Assamese	Essay	Homen Borgohain	
2007	Anjali Daimary	Adra Lirnai Sanreb	Adha Lekha Dastabez	Assamese		Indira Goswami	
2008	Pradip Raja Brahma	Sni-Bifan Ramayan	Krittibasa Ramayana	Bengali	Poetry	Mahakvai Krittibasa	
2009	Gobindo Narzary	Mwsou Daan	Godan	Hindi	Novel	Munshi Premchand	
2010	Uthrisar Khungur Basumatary	Yiaruingam	Yiaruingam	Assamese	Novel	Birendra Kumar Bhattacharya	
2011	Hari Narayan Khaklary	Volganifrai Ganga	Volga se Ganga	Hindi	Novel	Rahul Sankrityayan	
2012	Swarna Prabha Chainary	Nwizise Sungdo Solo	21 Short Stories By Rabindranath	Bengali	Short Stories	Rabindranath Tagore	
2013	Gobinda Boro	Jagari	Jagori	Bengali	Novel	Satinath Bhaduri	
2014	Surath Narzary	Geetanjali	Geetanjali	Bengali	Poetry	Rabindranath Tagore	
2015	Dhansri Swargiary	Jaharni Mwnthai	Aranyer Adhikar	Bengali	Novel	Mahasweta Devi	
2016	Birhas Giri Basumatary	Thengphakri Tahsildarni Thamani Thungri	Thengphakri Tahsildaror Tamor Torowal	Assamese	Novel	Mamoni Raisom Goswami	
2017	Gobinda Basumatary	Gaddar	Gaddar	Hindi	Novel	Krishan Chander	
2018	Nabin Brahma	Binodini	Chokher Bali	Bengali	Novel	Rabindranath Tagore	
2019	Gopinath Brahma	Abwnglaorini Fao	Daivathinte Vikrithikal	Malayalam	Novel	M. Mukundan	
2020	Kameshwar Brahma	Gibi Bharatni Jarimin	The Penguin History of Early India : from the Origins to AD 1300	English	History	Romila Thapar	
2021	Indira Boro	Hirimba	Hirimba	Assamese	Novel	Jayanti Gogoi	
2022	Raja Devojit Basumatary	Kabuliwalani Bangali Biji	Kabuliwalar Bangali Bou	Bengali	Novel	Sushmita Bandyopadhyay	
2023	Ambikagiri Hajowary	Santanufwlerni Fisajla	Santanukulanandan	Assamese	Noval	Purabi Bormudoi	
2024	Uttara Bwiswmuthiary	Kanchan	Kanchan	Assamese	Noval	Anuradha Sharma Pujari	

== See also ==
- List of Sahitya Akademi Award winners for Bodo
