= List of Sahitya Akademi Award winners for Meitei =

List of winners of a literary honor in India

Sahitya Akademi Award for Meitei
- Award for contributions to Meitei literature
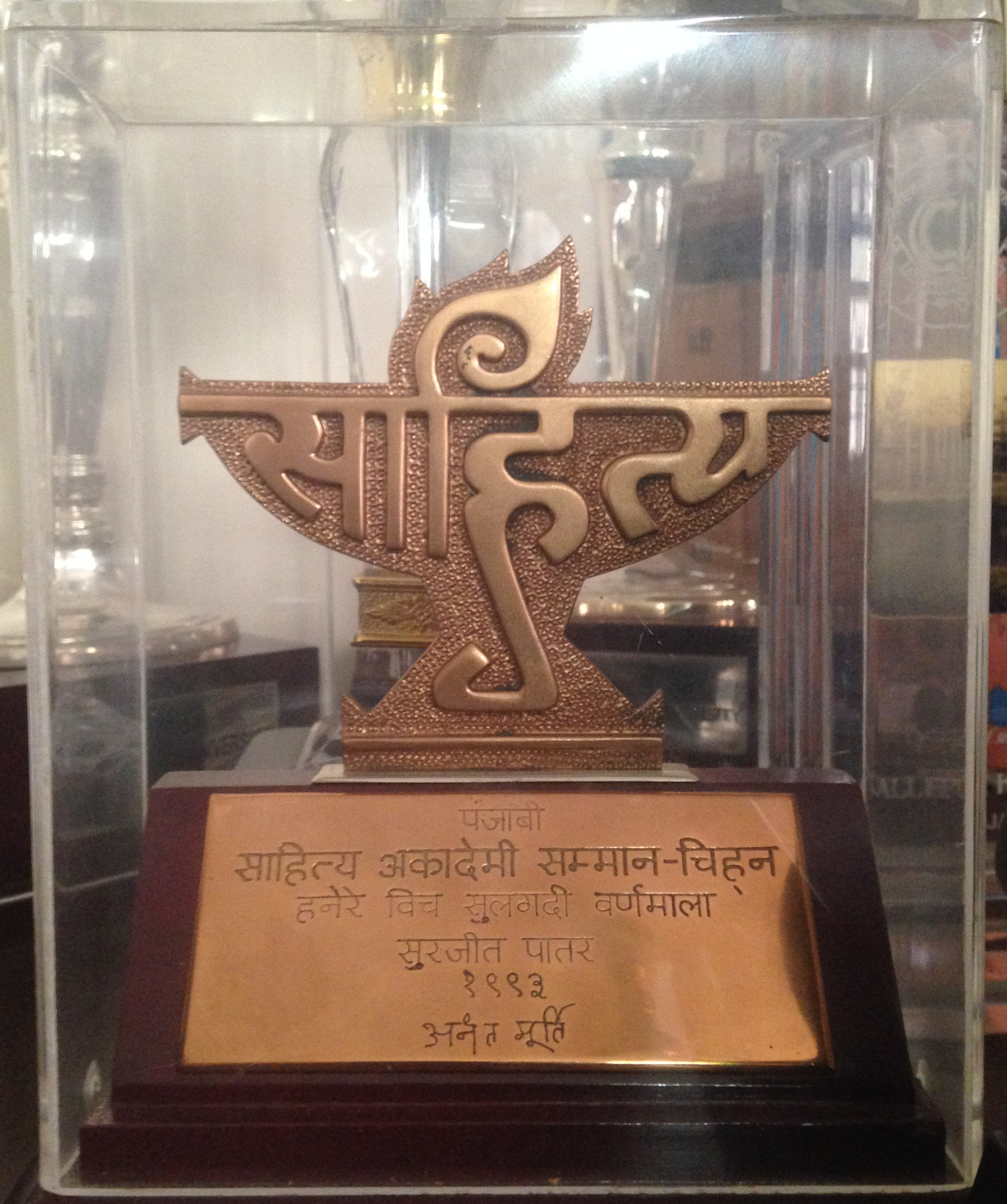
- Awarded for: Literary award in India
- Sponsored by: Sahitya Akademi, Government of India
- Reward: ₹1 lakh (US$1,100)
- First award: 1973
- Final award: 2024

Highlights
- Total awarded: 50
- First winner: Pacha Meetei
- Most Recent winner: Haobam Satyabati Devi
- Website: Official website

Part of a series on

Sahitya Akademi Awards
Category
Sahitya Akademi Award winners by language
- Assamese
- Bengali
- Bodo
- Dogri
- English
- Gujarati
- Hindi
- Kannada
- Kashmiri
- Konkani
- Maithili
- Malayalam
- Marathi
- Meitei (Manipuri)
- Nepali
- Odia
- Punjabi
- Rajasthani
- Sanskrit
- Santali
- Sindhi
- Tamil
- Telugu
- Urdu
Sahitya Akademi Translation Prizes
- Assamese
- Bengali
- Bodo
- Dogri
- English
- Gujarati
- Hindi
- Kannada
- Kashmiri
- Konkani
- Maithili
- Malayalam
- Marathi
- Meitei (Manipuri)
- Nepali
- Odia
- Punjabi
- Rajasthani
- Sanskrit
- Santali
- Sindhi
- Tamil
- Telugu
- Urdu
Sahitya Akademi Yuva Puraskar
- Assamese
- Bengali
- Bodo
- Dogri
- English
- Gujarati
- Hindi
- Kannada
- Kashmiri
- Konkani
- Maithili
- Malayalam
- Meitei (Manipuri)
- Marathi
- Nepali
- Odia
- Punjabi
- Rajasthani
- Sanskrit
- Santali
- Sindhi
- Tamil
- Telugu
- Urdu
Sahitya Akademi Bal Sahitya Puraskar
- Assamese
- Bengali
- Bodo
- Dogri
- English
- Gujarati
- Hindi
- Kannada
- Kashmiri
- Konkani
- Maithili
- Malayalam
- Meitei (Manipuri)
- Marathi
- Nepali
- Odia
- Punjabi
- Rajasthani
- Sanskrit
- Santali
- Sindhi
- Tamil
- Telugu
- Urdu
Related
- Eighth Schedule to the Constitution of India
- Official Languages Commission
- List of languages by number of native speakers in India

The Sahitya Akademi Award has been given each year since 1955 by Sahitya Akademi (India's National Academy of Letters) to writers and their works, for their outstanding contribution to the Indian and Meitei literature (Manipuri literature). No awards were given in 1975 and 1980.

== Winners ==
Year	Author	Book	Category
2025	Haobam Nalini	Kanglamdriba Eephut	Short Story
2024	Haobam Satyabati Devi	Mainu Bora Nungshi Sheirol	Poetry
2023	Sorokkhaibam Gambhini	Yachangba Nang Hallo	Poetry
2022	Koijam Shantibala	Leironnung	Poetry
2021	Thokchom Ibohanbi Singh	Manipurida Punshi Warigee Sahitya	Criticism
2020	Irungbam Deven	Malangbana Kari Hai	Poetry
2019	L. Biramangol Singh (Beryl Thanga)	Ei Amadi Adungeigi Ethat	Novel
2018	Budhichandra Heisnamba	Ngamkheigee Wangmada	Short Stories
2017	Rajen Toijamba	Chahi Taret Khuntaakpa	Play
2016	Moirangthem Rajen	Cheptharaba Eshingpun	Short stories
2015	Kshetri Rajen	Ahingna Yekshilliba Mang	Poetry
2014	Naorem Bidyasagar Singh	Khung-Gang Amasung Refugee	Poetry
2013	Makhonmani Mongsaba	Chinglon Amadagi Amada	Travelogue
2012	Jodhachandra Sanasam	Mathou Kanba DNA	Novel
2011	Kshetri Bira	Nangbu Ngaibada	Novel
2010	Moirangthem Borkanya	Leikangla	Novel
2009	Raghu Leishangthem	Kunggang gee Chithi	Poetry
2008	Arambam Memchoubi	Idu Ningthou	Poetry
2007	B. M. Maisnamba	Imashi Nurabee	Novel
2006	Saratchand Thiyam	Nungshibi Greece	Travelogue
2005	M. Nabakishore Singh	Pangal Sonbee Eise Adomgeeni	Short stories
2004	Birendrajit Naorem	Lanthengnariba Lanmee	Poetry
2003	Sudhir Naoroibam	Leiyee Khara Punsee Khara	Short stories
2002	Rajkumar Bhubonsana	Mei Mamgera Budhi Mamgera	Poems
2001	Ningombam Sunita	Khongji Makhol	Short stories
2000	Laitonjam Premchand Singh	Eemagi Phanek Machet	Short stories
1999	Sagolsem Lanchenba Meetei	Hee Nangbu Hondeda	Poetry
1998	Keisham Priyokumar	Nongdi Tarak-Khidare	Short stories
1997	Thangjam Ibopishak Singh	Bhut Amasung Maikhum	Poetry
1996	R. K. Madhubir	Praloigi Meiriraktagi	Poetry
1995	Arambam Samarendra Singh	Leipaklei	Play
1994	Rajkumar Mani Singh	Mayai Karaba Shamu	Short stories
1993	Arambam Biren Singh	Punshigee Marudyan	Novel
1992	A. Chitreshwar Sharma	Tharoshangbi	Novel
1991	Yumlemban Ibomcha Singh	Numitti Asum Thengjillakani	Short stories
1990	Nongthombam Shri Biren Singh	Mapal Naidabasida Ei	Poetry
1989	Nilabir Sharma Shastri	Tatkhrabha Punshi Leipul	Short stories
1988	E. Sonamani Singh	Mamangthong Lollabadi Maningthongda Lakudana	Short stories
1987	E. Nilakanta Singh	Tirtha Yatra	Poetry
1986	Khumanthem Prakash Singh	Mangi Isei	Short stories
1985	H. Guno Singh	Bir Tikendrajit Road	Novel
1984	Lamabam Viramani Singh	Chekla Paikhrabada	Short Stories
1983	N. Ibobi Singh	Karnagi Mama Amasung Karnagi Aroiba Yahip	Play
1982	E. Dinamani Singh	Pistal Ama, Kundalei Ama	Short stories
1981	E. Rajanikanta Singh	Kalenthagi Leipaklei	Short stories
1979	M. K. Binodini Devi	Boro Saheb Ongbi Sanatombi	Novel
1978	G. C. Tongbra	Ngabongkhao	Play
1977	Ashangbam Minaketan Singh	Aseibagi Nityaipod	Poetry
1976	L. Samarendra Singh	Mamang Leikai Thambal Shatle	Poetry
1974	N. Kunjamohan Singh	Ilisa Amagi Mahao	Short stories
1973	Pacha Meetei	Imphal Amasung Magee Ishing Nungshitkee Phibam	Novel

Note: No awards in 1975 and 1980.

== See also ==
- List of Yuva Puraskar winners for Meitei
- List of epics in Meitei language
- Meitei literature
- Meitei Language Day
- History of Manipur
