= List of Sahitya Akademi Translation Prize winners for Sindhi =

List of winners of a literary honor in India

Part of a series on

Sahitya Akademi Awards
Category
Sahitya Akademi Award winners by language
- Assamese
- Bengali
- Bodo
- Dogri
- English
- Gujarati
- Hindi
- Kannada
- Kashmiri
- Konkani
- Maithili
- Malayalam
- Marathi
- Meitei (Manipuri)
- Nepali
- Odia
- Punjabi
- Rajasthani
- Sanskrit
- Santali
- Sindhi
- Tamil
- Telugu
- Urdu
Sahitya Akademi Translation Prizes
- Assamese
- Bengali
- Bodo
- Dogri
- English
- Gujarati
- Hindi
- Kannada
- Kashmiri
- Konkani
- Maithili
- Malayalam
- Marathi
- Meitei (Manipuri)
- Nepali
- Odia
- Punjabi
- Rajasthani
- Sanskrit
- Santali
- Sindhi
- Tamil
- Telugu
- Urdu
Sahitya Akademi Yuva Puraskar
- Assamese
- Bengali
- Bodo
- Dogri
- English
- Gujarati
- Hindi
- Kannada
- Kashmiri
- Konkani
- Maithili
- Malayalam
- Meitei (Manipuri)
- Marathi
- Nepali
- Odia
- Punjabi
- Rajasthani
- Sanskrit
- Santali
- Sindhi
- Tamil
- Telugu
- Urdu
Sahitya Akademi Bal Sahitya Puraskar
- Assamese
- Bengali
- Bodo
- Dogri
- English
- Gujarati
- Hindi
- Kannada
- Kashmiri
- Konkani
- Maithili
- Malayalam
- Meitei (Manipuri)
- Marathi
- Nepali
- Odia
- Punjabi
- Rajasthani
- Sanskrit
- Santali
- Sindhi
- Tamil
- Telugu
- Urdu
Related
- Eighth Schedule to the Constitution of India
- Official Languages Commission
- List of languages by number of native speakers in India

Sahitya Akademi Translation Prizes are given each year to writers for their outstanding translations work in the 24 official languages of India, since 1989.

== Recipients ==
Following is the list of recipients of Sahitya Akademi translation prizes for their works written in Sindhi. The award, as of 2019, consisted of ₹50,000.

Year	Translator	Title of the translation	Original title	Original language	Genre	Original Author	References
1989	Jagat Assudomal Advani	Rolak Ji Atam Kahani	Kuna Ekachi Bhramanagatha	Marathi	Novel	G. N. Dandekar	
1990	Biharilal Chhabria	Sat Kadam (Two Parts)	Saptapadi	Bengali	Novel	Tarasankar Bandyopadhyay	
1991	Vasdev ‘Nirmal’	Choonda Marathi Kahaniyoon	Maratht Laghu Katha-Sangrah	Marathi	Short Stories	Various authors	
1992	Lachman Hardwani	Yuga Jo Antu	Yuganta	Marathi	Epic	Irawati Karve	
1995	Shyam Jaisinghani	Chani	Chani	Marathi	Novel	C. T. Khanolkar	
1996	Laxman Bhatia ‘Komal’	Pan Chhan Jo Parlao	Patjhar Ki Awaz	Urdu	Short stories	Qurratulain Hyder	
1997	Hiro Shewkani	Sindhi Adaba Jee Tarikha	History of Sindhi Literature	English	History	Lalsingh H. Ajwani	
1998	Lakhmi Khilani	Asamaya	Asamaya	Bengali	Novel	Bimal Kar	
1999	Baldev Matlani	Funey Tahqiq Ain Unja Usool	Fancy Tahiquiq	Urdu	Essays	A. Sattar Dalvi	
2001	Krishin Khatwani	Akhar Jo Hik Dhihu	Ashadh Ka Ek Din	Hindi	Play	Mohan Rakesh	
2003	Krishin Rahi	Tamas	Tamas	Hindi	Novel	Bhisham Sahni	
2004	Yashodara Wadhwani	Sindhu Kanya	Sindhu Kanya	Sanskrit	Historical Novel	Shrinath S. Hasurkar	
2005	Hundraj Balwani	Meera Yagnik Ji Diary	Meera Yagnik Nee Diary	Gujarati	Novel	Bindu Bhatt	
2007	Vishy Bellani	Agni Sakshi Diary	Agnisakshi	Malayalam	Novel	Lalithambika Antharjanam	
2008	Kamla Goklani	Kabir Vachnavali	Selection	Hindi	Poetry	Kabir	
2009	Jhamu Chhugani	Shri Radha	Shri Radha	Oria	Poetry	Ramakanta Rath	
2010	Paru Chawla	Karmelin	Karmelin	Konkani	Novel	Damodar Mauzo	
2011	Jetho Lalwani	Shaadee Ta Kari	Jetho Lalwani	Gujarati	Play	Damu Sangani	
2012	Choond Hiro Thakur	Krishin Chandar Joon Nandiyoon Kahaniyoon	Collection	English	Short stories	Krishan Chander	
2013	Khiman U. Mulani	Dr. Ambedkar Hik Prernadayee Shakhisyat	Dr. Ambedkar	English	Articles	Ratan Kumar Sambharia	
2014	Ram Kukreja	Maru Tirtha Hinglaaj	Marutirtha Hinglaj	Bengali	Novel	Kalikananda Abadhut	
2015	Sarita Sharma	Lal Ded	Lal Ded	Dogri	Novel	Ved Rahi	
2016	Mohan Gehani	Bharat Natya Shastra	Bharat Natya Shastra	English	Literary Criticism	Kapila Vatsyayan	
2017	Arjun Chawla	Sarhad Taan	Sarhad Se	Hindi	Poetry	Manohar Batham	
2018	Jagdish Lachhani	Manjogee	Manjogee	Hindi	Novel	Prabodh Kumar Govil	
2019	Dholan Rahi	Mitho Pani Kharo Pani	Mitha Paani Khara Paani	Hindi	Novel	Jaya Jadwani	
2020	Sandhya Kundnani	Uha Lambi Khamoshi	That Long Silence	English	Novel	Shashi Deshpande	
2021	Meena Roopchandani	Aju-Subhane-Parheen	Aaj-Kal-Parson	Hindi	Short stories	Rajmohan Jha	
2022	Bhagwan Atlani	Kiliyun Te Tangiyal Shakhs	Khuntiyon Par Tange Log	Hindi	Poetry	Sarveshwar Dayal Saxena	
2023	Bhagwan Babani	Sado Lifafo	Sada Lifafa	Bengali	Novel	Moti Nandi	
2024	Shobha Lalchandani	Dollar Nuhaan	Dollar Bahu	Hindi	Novel	Sudha Murty	

== See also ==
- List of Sahitya Akademi Award winners for Sindhi
