= List of Sahitya Akademi Translation Prize winners for Nepali =

List of winners of a literary honor in India

Part of a series on

Sahitya Akademi Awards
Category
Sahitya Akademi Award winners by language
- Assamese
- Bengali
- Bodo
- Dogri
- English
- Gujarati
- Hindi
- Kannada
- Kashmiri
- Konkani
- Maithili
- Malayalam
- Marathi
- Meitei (Manipuri)
- Nepali
- Odia
- Punjabi
- Rajasthani
- Sanskrit
- Santali
- Sindhi
- Tamil
- Telugu
- Urdu
Sahitya Akademi Translation Prizes
- Assamese
- Bengali
- Bodo
- Dogri
- English
- Gujarati
- Hindi
- Kannada
- Kashmiri
- Konkani
- Maithili
- Malayalam
- Marathi
- Meitei (Manipuri)
- Nepali
- Odia
- Punjabi
- Rajasthani
- Sanskrit
- Santali
- Sindhi
- Tamil
- Telugu
- Urdu
Sahitya Akademi Yuva Puraskar
- Assamese
- Bengali
- Bodo
- Dogri
- English
- Gujarati
- Hindi
- Kannada
- Kashmiri
- Konkani
- Maithili
- Malayalam
- Meitei (Manipuri)
- Marathi
- Nepali
- Odia
- Punjabi
- Rajasthani
- Sanskrit
- Santali
- Sindhi
- Tamil
- Telugu
- Urdu
Sahitya Akademi Bal Sahitya Puraskar
- Assamese
- Bengali
- Bodo
- Dogri
- English
- Gujarati
- Hindi
- Kannada
- Kashmiri
- Konkani
- Maithili
- Malayalam
- Meitei (Manipuri)
- Marathi
- Nepali
- Odia
- Punjabi
- Rajasthani
- Sanskrit
- Santali
- Sindhi
- Tamil
- Telugu
- Urdu
Related
- Eighth Schedule to the Constitution of India
- Official Languages Commission
- List of languages by number of native speakers in India

Sahitya Akademi Translation Prizes are given each year to writers for their outstanding translations work in the 24 languages, since 1989.

== Recipients ==
Following is the list of recipients of Sahitya Akademi translation prizes for their works written in Nepali. The award, as of 2019, consisted of ₹50,000.

| Year | Translator | Title of the translation | Original Title | Original Language | Genre | Original Author | References |
|---|---|---|---|---|---|---|---|
| 1994 | Karna Thami | Sakanta Ka Kavitaharu | Collection | Bengali | Poetry | Sukanta Bhattacharya | |
| 1997 | Shiva Shamsher Rasaily | Biraj Dulahi | Biraj Bahoo | Bengali | Novel | Sarat Chandra Chattopadhyay | |
| 1998 | Chabilal Upadhyaya | Chandragupta | Chandragupta | Hindi | Play | Jaishankar Prasad | |
| 1999 | Kiran Kumar Rai | Ardhabritta Jivanyatra | Aadha Lekha Dastavej | Assamese | Novel | Indira Goswami | |
| 2000 | B. Yonjan | Krishnachandraka Katha | Collection | Urdu | Short Stories | Krishan Chander | |
| 2001 | Durga Khatiwoda | Brahmaputta Ka Chhalharoo | Galpar Gaspera | Assamese | Short Stories | Dinesh Sharma | |
| 2002 | Shanti Thapa | Namghare | Namgharia | Assamese | Novel | Atulananda Goswami | |
| 2003 | Subhas Deepak | Pal-Vipal | Pal-Khin | Dogri | Novel | Om Goswami | |
| 2004 | Bhanu Chhetri | Mero Desh Mero Manche Haru | Na Desam Na Prajalu | Telugu | Epic | Seshendra Sharma | |
| 2005 | Pushpadhar Sharma | Hiren Bhattacharyako Nirbachita Kavita | Collection | Assamese | Poetry | Hiren Bhattacharyya | |
| 2006 | K.B. Nepali | Meghdoot | Meghadūta | Sanskrit | Poetry | Kalidas | |
| 2008 | Jeewan Rana | Dr. Vidya Bindu Singh Ka Kehi Kavitaharu | Collection | Hindi | Poetry | Vidya Vindu Singh | |
| 2009 | Om Narayan Gupta | Haivadan | Hayavadana | Kannada | Play | Girish Karnad | |
| 2010 | Tarapati Upadhyaya | Ananda Math | Anandamath | Bengali | Novel | Bankim Chandra Chattopadhyaya | |
| 2011 | Khemraj Nepal | Avinasi | Avinashi | Sanskrit | Novel | Biswanarayan Shastri | |
| 2012 | Gita Upadhyaya | Darbarki Susare | Karengar Ligiri | Assamese | Play | Jyoti Prasad Agarwala | |
| 2013 | I.K. Singh | Maila Anchal | Maila Anchal | Hindi | Novel | Phanishwar Nath Renu | |
| 2014 | Dambarmani Pradhan | Malai Jun Chahinchha | Mujhe Chand Chahiye | Hindi | Novel | Surendra Verma | |
| 2015 | Shankar Pradhan | Birataki Padmini | Virata Ki Padmini | Hindi | Novel | Vrindavan Lal Verma | |
| 2016 | Gyanbahadur Chhetri | Khoji | Talash | Poetry | Novel | Brajendra Tripathi | |
| 2017 | Chandramani Upadhyaya | Jibanka Batama | Jibanar Batot | Assamese | Novel | Bina Baruah | |
| 2018 | Monica Mukhia | Yo Prachin Veena | Yo Prachin Beena | Malayalam | Poetry | O. N. V. Kurup | |
| 2019 | Sachin Rai 'Dumi' | Bojule Bhaneko Katha | Grandmother's Tale | English | Novel | R. K. Narayan | |
| 2020 | Bhawani Adhikari | Euta Pistol Euta Kunda Puspa | Pistol Ama Kunda Lei Ama | Manipuri | Short Stories | Elangbam Dinamani | |
| 2021 | Sanjib Upadhyaya | Babu-Chhora | Pita-Putra | Assamese | Novel | Homen Borgohain | |
| 2022 | Purna Kumar Sarmah | Shantanukulanandan | Shantanukulanandan | Assamese | Novel | Purabi Bormudoi | |
| 2023 | Chhatraman Subba | Kayakalpa | Kayakalpa | Assamese | Novel | Lakshmi Nandan Bora | |
| 2024 | Amar Baaniyaa 'Lohoro' | Maatribhuumi | Vatan | Hindi | Novel | Dr. Nirmal Walia | |

== See also ==
- List of Sahitya Akademi Award winners for Nepali
