= List of Bal Sahitya Puraskar winners for Kannada =

Winners of a literary honour in India

Part of a series on

Sahitya Akademi Awards
Category
Sahitya Akademi Award winners by language
- Assamese
- Bengali
- Bodo
- Dogri
- English
- Gujarati
- Hindi
- Kannada
- Kashmiri
- Konkani
- Maithili
- Malayalam
- Marathi
- Meitei (Manipuri)
- Nepali
- Odia
- Punjabi
- Rajasthani
- Sanskrit
- Santali
- Sindhi
- Tamil
- Telugu
- Urdu
Sahitya Akademi Translation Prizes
- Assamese
- Bengali
- Bodo
- Dogri
- English
- Gujarati
- Hindi
- Kannada
- Kashmiri
- Konkani
- Maithili
- Malayalam
- Marathi
- Meitei (Manipuri)
- Nepali
- Odia
- Punjabi
- Rajasthani
- Sanskrit
- Santali
- Sindhi
- Tamil
- Telugu
- Urdu
Sahitya Akademi Yuva Puraskar
- Assamese
- Bengali
- Bodo
- Dogri
- English
- Gujarati
- Hindi
- Kannada
- Kashmiri
- Konkani
- Maithili
- Malayalam
- Meitei (Manipuri)
- Marathi
- Nepali
- Odia
- Punjabi
- Rajasthani
- Sanskrit
- Santali
- Sindhi
- Tamil
- Telugu
- Urdu
Sahitya Akademi Bal Sahitya Puraskar
- Assamese
- Bengali
- Bodo
- Dogri
- English
- Gujarati
- Hindi
- Kannada
- Kashmiri
- Konkani
- Maithili
- Malayalam
- Meitei (Manipuri)
- Marathi
- Nepali
- Odia
- Punjabi
- Rajasthani
- Sanskrit
- Santali
- Sindhi
- Tamil
- Telugu
- Urdu
Related
- Eighth Schedule to the Constitution of India
- Official Languages Commission
- List of languages by number of native speakers in India

Bal Sahitya Puraskar is given each year to writers for their outstanding works in the 24 languages, since 2010.

== Recipients ==
Following is the list of recipients of Bal Sahitya Puraskar for their works written in Kannada. The award comprises a cash prize of Rs. 50,000 and an engraved copper plaque.

Year	Author	Work	Genre	References
2010	Bolwar Mahammad Kunhi	Paapu Gandhi: Gandhi Baapu Aada Kathe	Novelette	
2011	Na D'Souza	Total Contribution to Children's Literature		
2012	Palakala Sitaram Bhatta	Mulugade Oorige Bandavaru	Novelette	
2013	H.S. Venkateshmurthy	Total Contribution to Children's Literature		
2014	Anand V. Patil	Total Contribution to Children's Literature		
2015	T. S. Nagaraja Shetty	Total Contribution to Children's Literature		
2016	Sumatheendra Nadig	Total Contribution to Children's Literature		
2017	N. S. Lakshminarayan Bhat	Total Contribution to Children's Literature		
2018	KanchyaniSharanappa ShivasanQappa	Total Contribution to Children's Literature		
2019	Chandrakant Karadalli	Kadu Kanasina Beedige	Novel	
2020	H. S. Byakod	Nanoo Ambedkar	Novel	
2021	Basu Bevinagida	Odi Hoda Huduga	Novel	
2022	Tammanna Beegara	Bavali Guhe	Novel	
2023	Vijayashree Haladi	Surakki Gate	Novel	
2024	Krishnamurthy Biligere	Choomantrayyana Kathegalu	Short Stories	
2025	K Shivalingappa Handihal	Notebook	Short Stories	

== See also ==
- List of Sahitya Akademi Award winners for Kannada
