= Lists of Sahitya Akademi Award winners =

Award winner list

Part of a series on

Sahitya Akademi Awards
Category
Sahitya Akademi Award winners by language
- Assamese
- Bengali
- Bodo
- Dogri
- English
- Gujarati
- Hindi
- Kannada
- Kashmiri
- Konkani
- Maithili
- Malayalam
- Marathi
- Meitei (Manipuri)
- Nepali
- Odia
- Punjabi
- Rajasthani
- Sanskrit
- Santali
- Sindhi
- Tamil
- Telugu
- Urdu
Sahitya Akademi Translation Prizes
- Assamese
- Bengali
- Bodo
- Dogri
- English
- Gujarati
- Hindi
- Kannada
- Kashmiri
- Konkani
- Maithili
- Malayalam
- Marathi
- Meitei (Manipuri)
- Nepali
- Odia
- Punjabi
- Rajasthani
- Sanskrit
- Santali
- Sindhi
- Tamil
- Telugu
- Urdu
Sahitya Akademi Yuva Puraskar
- Assamese
- Bengali
- Bodo
- Dogri
- English
- Gujarati
- Hindi
- Kannada
- Kashmiri
- Konkani
- Maithili
- Malayalam
- Meitei (Manipuri)
- Marathi
- Nepali
- Odia
- Punjabi
- Rajasthani
- Sanskrit
- Santali
- Sindhi
- Tamil
- Telugu
- Urdu
Sahitya Akademi Bal Sahitya Puraskar
- Assamese
- Bengali
- Bodo
- Dogri
- English
- Gujarati
- Hindi
- Kannada
- Kashmiri
- Konkani
- Maithili
- Malayalam
- Meitei (Manipuri)
- Marathi
- Nepali
- Odia
- Punjabi
- Rajasthani
- Sanskrit
- Santali
- Sindhi
- Tamil
- Telugu
- Urdu
Related
- Eighth Schedule to the Constitution of India
- Official Languages Commission
- List of languages by number of native speakers in India

Lists of Sahitya Akademi Award winners cover winners of the Sahitya Akademi Award, a literary honor in India which Sahitya Akademi, India's National Academy of Letters, annually confers on writers of outstanding works in one of the twenty-four major Indian languages. The lists are alphabetically organized by language.

- List of Sahitya Akademi Award winners for Assamese
- List of Sahitya Akademi Award winners for Bengali
- List of Sahitya Akademi Award winners for Bodo
- List of Sahitya Akademi Award winners for Dogri
- List of Sahitya Akademi Award winners for English
- List of Sahitya Akademi Award winners for Gujarati
- List of Sahitya Akademi Award winners for Hindi
- List of Sahitya Akademi Award winners for Kannada
- List of Sahitya Akademi Award winners for Kashmiri
- List of Sahitya Akademi Award winners for Konkani
- List of Sahitya Akademi Award winners for Maithili
- List of Sahitya Akademi Award winners for Malayalam
- List of Sahitya Akademi Award winners for Meitei
- List of Sahitya Akademi Award winners for Marathi
- List of Sahitya Akademi Award winners for Nepali
- List of Sahitya Akademi Award winners for Odia
- List of Sahitya Akademi Award winners for Punjabi
- List of Sahitya Akademi Award winners for Rajasthani
- List of Sahitya Akademi Award winners for Sanskrit
- List of Sahitya Akademi Award winners for Santali
- List of Sahitya Akademi Award winners for Sindhi
- List of Sahitya Akademi Award winners for Tamil
- List of Sahitya Akademi Award winners for Telugu
- List of Sahitya Akademi Award winners for Urdu
