= List of Bal Sahitya Puraskar winners for Gujarati =

Winners of a literary honour in India

Part of a series on

Sahitya Akademi Awards
Category
Sahitya Akademi Award winners by language
- Assamese
- Bengali
- Bodo
- Dogri
- English
- Gujarati
- Hindi
- Kannada
- Kashmiri
- Konkani
- Maithili
- Malayalam
- Marathi
- Meitei (Manipuri)
- Nepali
- Odia
- Punjabi
- Rajasthani
- Sanskrit
- Santali
- Sindhi
- Tamil
- Telugu
- Urdu
Sahitya Akademi Translation Prizes
- Assamese
- Bengali
- Bodo
- Dogri
- English
- Gujarati
- Hindi
- Kannada
- Kashmiri
- Konkani
- Maithili
- Malayalam
- Marathi
- Meitei (Manipuri)
- Nepali
- Odia
- Punjabi
- Rajasthani
- Sanskrit
- Santali
- Sindhi
- Tamil
- Telugu
- Urdu
Sahitya Akademi Yuva Puraskar
- Assamese
- Bengali
- Bodo
- Dogri
- English
- Gujarati
- Hindi
- Kannada
- Kashmiri
- Konkani
- Maithili
- Malayalam
- Meitei (Manipuri)
- Marathi
- Nepali
- Odia
- Punjabi
- Rajasthani
- Sanskrit
- Santali
- Sindhi
- Tamil
- Telugu
- Urdu
Sahitya Akademi Bal Sahitya Puraskar
- Assamese
- Bengali
- Bodo
- Dogri
- English
- Gujarati
- Hindi
- Kannada
- Kashmiri
- Konkani
- Maithili
- Malayalam
- Meitei (Manipuri)
- Marathi
- Nepali
- Odia
- Punjabi
- Rajasthani
- Sanskrit
- Santali
- Sindhi
- Tamil
- Telugu
- Urdu
Related
- Eighth Schedule to the Constitution of India
- Official Languages Commission
- List of languages by number of native speakers in India

Bal Sahitya Puraskar is given each year to writers for their outstanding works in the 24 languages, since 2010.

== Recipients ==
Following is the list of recipients of Bal Sahitya Puraskar for their works written in Gujarati. The award comprises a cash prize of Rs. 50,000 and an engraved copper plaque.

Year	Author	Work	Genre	References
2010	Yashwant Mehta	Total Contribution to Children's Literature		
2011	Ramesh Parekh	Total Contribution to Children's Literature		
2012	Yoseph Macwan	Aav Haya, Varta Kahu...	Short Stories	
2013	Sharaddha Trivedi	Total Contribution to Children's Literature		
2014	Ishwar Parmar	Total Contribution to Children's Literature		
2015	Dhiruben Patel	Total Contribution to Children's Literature		
2016	Pushpa Antani	Bantina Surajdada	Short Stories	
2017	Harish Nayak	Total Contribution to Children's Literature		
2018	Chandrakant Sheth	Total Contribution to Children's Literature		
2019	Kumarpal Desai	Total Contribution to Children's Literature		
2020	Natwar Patel	Bhurini Ajayab Safar	Short Stories	
2021	No award			
2022	Kirit Goswami	Khiskoli Ne Computer Chhe Levu	Poetry	
2023	Rakshabahen Prahladrao Dave	Hun Myaun, Tun Choon Choon	Poetry and Stories	
2024	Gira Pinakin Bhatt	Hasati Haveli	Stories	
2025	Kirtida Brahmbhatt	Tinchak	Poetry	

== See also ==
- List of Sahitya Akademi Award winners for Gujarati
