= List of Yuva Puraskar winners for Meitei =

List of winners of a literary honor in India

Part of a series on

Sahitya Akademi Awards
Category
Sahitya Akademi Award winners by language
- Assamese
- Bengali
- Bodo
- Dogri
- English
- Gujarati
- Hindi
- Kannada
- Kashmiri
- Konkani
- Maithili
- Malayalam
- Marathi
- Meitei (Manipuri)
- Nepali
- Odia
- Punjabi
- Rajasthani
- Sanskrit
- Santali
- Sindhi
- Tamil
- Telugu
- Urdu
Sahitya Akademi Translation Prizes
- Assamese
- Bengali
- Bodo
- Dogri
- English
- Gujarati
- Hindi
- Kannada
- Kashmiri
- Konkani
- Maithili
- Malayalam
- Marathi
- Meitei (Manipuri)
- Nepali
- Odia
- Punjabi
- Rajasthani
- Sanskrit
- Santali
- Sindhi
- Tamil
- Telugu
- Urdu
Sahitya Akademi Yuva Puraskar
- Assamese
- Bengali
- Bodo
- Dogri
- English
- Gujarati
- Hindi
- Kannada
- Kashmiri
- Konkani
- Maithili
- Malayalam
- Meitei (Manipuri)
- Marathi
- Nepali
- Odia
- Punjabi
- Rajasthani
- Sanskrit
- Santali
- Sindhi
- Tamil
- Telugu
- Urdu
Sahitya Akademi Bal Sahitya Puraskar
- Assamese
- Bengali
- Bodo
- Dogri
- English
- Gujarati
- Hindi
- Kannada
- Kashmiri
- Konkani
- Maithili
- Malayalam
- Meitei (Manipuri)
- Marathi
- Nepali
- Odia
- Punjabi
- Rajasthani
- Sanskrit
- Santali
- Sindhi
- Tamil
- Telugu
- Urdu
Related
- Eighth Schedule to the Constitution of India
- Official Languages Commission
- List of languages by number of native speakers in India

Yuva Puraskar is a literary award. It is given each year to young writers for their outstanding works in the 24 languages, since 2011.

== Recipients ==
Year	Author	Work	Type of Work	Reference
2011	Debachand	Nongthangna Mutkhrabada	Short Stories	
2012	Ranjita Konthoujam	Shingnabagi Ka Amasung Dairy Gimapu	Short Stories	
2013	Akhom Yandibala Devi	Lai Matha Shaari	Poetry	
2014	Wangthoi Khuman	Ngayonba Asheiba	Poetry	
2015	Angom Sarita Devi	Mee Amashung Shaa	Poetry	
2016	Chongtham Dipu Singh	Torbanduda	Novel	
2017	Kh. Krishnamohan Singha	Kellaba Unagi Eshei	Poetry	
2018	Tongbram Amarjit Singh	Loubukki Manam	Poetry	
2019	Jiten Oinamba	Canvasta Tarakpa Pirangna	Poetry	
2020	Rameshwar Sharongbam	Kairaba Chaphu Machet	Poetry	
2021	Lenin Khumancha	Matamgee Manglan	Poetry	
2022	Sonia Khundrakpam	Loiyumba	Novel	
2023	Parshuram Thingnam	Matamgi Sheireng 37	Poetry	
2024	Waikhom Chingkheinganba	Ashiba Turel	Poetry	
2025	A. K. Jiten	Khoyum Nongdam Cow	Epic	

== See also ==
- List of Sahitya Akademi Award winners for Meitei
- List of Sahitya Akademi Translation Prize winners for Meitei
