= List of Sahitya Akademi Translation Prize winners for Kashmiri =

List of winners of a literary honor in India

Part of a series on

Sahitya Akademi Awards
Category
Sahitya Akademi Award winners by language
- Assamese
- Bengali
- Bodo
- Dogri
- English
- Gujarati
- Hindi
- Kannada
- Kashmiri
- Konkani
- Maithili
- Malayalam
- Marathi
- Meitei (Manipuri)
- Nepali
- Odia
- Punjabi
- Rajasthani
- Sanskrit
- Santali
- Sindhi
- Tamil
- Telugu
- Urdu
Sahitya Akademi Translation Prizes
- Assamese
- Bengali
- Bodo
- Dogri
- English
- Gujarati
- Hindi
- Kannada
- Kashmiri
- Konkani
- Maithili
- Malayalam
- Marathi
- Meitei (Manipuri)
- Nepali
- Odia
- Punjabi
- Rajasthani
- Sanskrit
- Santali
- Sindhi
- Tamil
- Telugu
- Urdu
Sahitya Akademi Yuva Puraskar
- Assamese
- Bengali
- Bodo
- Dogri
- English
- Gujarati
- Hindi
- Kannada
- Kashmiri
- Konkani
- Maithili
- Malayalam
- Meitei (Manipuri)
- Marathi
- Nepali
- Odia
- Punjabi
- Rajasthani
- Sanskrit
- Santali
- Sindhi
- Tamil
- Telugu
- Urdu
Sahitya Akademi Bal Sahitya Puraskar
- Assamese
- Bengali
- Bodo
- Dogri
- English
- Gujarati
- Hindi
- Kannada
- Kashmiri
- Konkani
- Maithili
- Malayalam
- Meitei (Manipuri)
- Marathi
- Nepali
- Odia
- Punjabi
- Rajasthani
- Sanskrit
- Santali
- Sindhi
- Tamil
- Telugu
- Urdu
Related
- Eighth Schedule to the Constitution of India
- Official Languages Commission
- List of languages by number of native speakers in India

Sahitya Akademi Translation Prizes are given each year to writers for their outstanding translations work in the 24 languages, since 1989.

== Recipients ==
Following is the list of recipients of Sahitya Akademi translation prizes for their works written in Kashmiri. The award, as of 2019, consisted of ₹50,000.

| Year | Translator | Title of the translation | Original Title | Original Language | Genre | Original Author | References |
|---|---|---|---|---|---|---|---|
| 1991 | Syed Rasool Pompur | Pranwaar | Ek Chadar Maili Si | Urdu | Novel | Rajinder Singh Bedi | |
| 1998 | Amar Malmohi | Kathasaritsagar | Kathasaritsagaram | Sanskrit | Short Stories | Somadeva | |
| 2004 | Rafeeq Masoodi | Tamas | Tamas | Hindi | Novel | Bhisham Sahni | |
| 2005 | Shafi Shauq | Ladakhich Tshaay | Shadow from Ladakh | English | Novel | Bhabani Bhattacharya | |
| 2006 | Nishat Ansari | Dr. Zakir Husain | Dr. Zakir Hussain | English | Biography | Mohammad Mujeeb | |
| 2007 | Mishal Sultanpuri | Nawim August | August Na | Oriya | Play | Manoranjan Das | |
| 2008 | Roop Krishan Bhat | Hindustani Afsaani | Collection | Various Languages | Short Stories | Various Authors | |
| 2009 | Shad Ramzan | Anhar Te Akas | Hundastani Afsane | Various Languages | Fiction | Various Authors | |
| 2010 | Abdul Gani Beig Athar | LukhKarYinVapas | Aale | Dogri | Short Stories | Ved Rahi | |
| 2011 | Satish Vimal | Wunai Te Siryi | Collection | Hindi | Poetry | Various Authors | |
| 2012 | Abdul Ahad Hajini | Tyoth Pazar | Collection | Various Languages | Short Stories | Various Authors | |
| 2013 | Aziz Hajini | Ze Gaz Zameen | Do Gaz Zameen | Urdu | Novel | Abdus Samad | |
| 2014 | Meem Hai Zaffar | Shiv Sutra | Shiv Sutra | Sanskrit | Essays | Vasu Gupt Reshi | |
| 2015 | Rattan Lal Shant | Lal Ded | Lal Ded | Dogri | Novel | Ved Rahi | |
| 2016 | Qazi Hilal Delnavi | Akh Khwab Akh Tasveer | Ek Aur Draupadi | Hindi | Poetry | Asha Shelay | |
| 2017 | Iqbal Nazki | Araam Kursi | Chaivu Narkali | Tamil | Novel | Thopil Mohammad Meeran | |
| 2018 | Muhammad Zaman Azurdah | Sakhtiyat Pas Sakhtiyat Te Mashriqi Sheriyat | Sakhtiyaat Pas-Sakhtiyaat Aur Mashriqui Sheriyaat | Urdu | Literary Criticism | Gopi Chand Narang | |
| 2019 | Ratan Lal Jauhar | Gora | Gora | Bengali | Novel | Rabindranath Tagore | |
| 2020 | Shafqat Altaf | Akh Hath Akh Nazme | 101 Selected Poems of Rabindranath Tagore | Bengali | Poetry | Rabindranath Tagore | |
| 2021 | Piarey Hatash | Tawi Aend Peak | Dogri Kahaniyan | Dogri | Short Stories | Various Authors | |
| 2022 | Shabnam Tilgami | Gitanjali | Gitanjali | Bengali | Poetry | Rabindranath Tagore | |
| 2023 | Gulzar Ahmad Rather | Chooma Sund Dol | Chomana Dudi | Kannada | Novel | Shivaram Karanth | |

== See also ==
- List of Sahitya Akademi Award winners for Kashmiri
