= List of Sahitya Akademi Translation Prize winners for Santali =

List of winners of a literary honor in India

Part of a series on

Sahitya Akademi Awards
Category
Sahitya Akademi Award winners by language
- Assamese
- Bengali
- Bodo
- Dogri
- English
- Gujarati
- Hindi
- Kannada
- Kashmiri
- Konkani
- Maithili
- Malayalam
- Marathi
- Meitei (Manipuri)
- Nepali
- Odia
- Punjabi
- Rajasthani
- Sanskrit
- Santali
- Sindhi
- Tamil
- Telugu
- Urdu
Sahitya Akademi Translation Prizes
- Assamese
- Bengali
- Bodo
- Dogri
- English
- Gujarati
- Hindi
- Kannada
- Kashmiri
- Konkani
- Maithili
- Malayalam
- Marathi
- Meitei (Manipuri)
- Nepali
- Odia
- Punjabi
- Rajasthani
- Sanskrit
- Santali
- Sindhi
- Tamil
- Telugu
- Urdu
Sahitya Akademi Yuva Puraskar
- Assamese
- Bengali
- Bodo
- Dogri
- English
- Gujarati
- Hindi
- Kannada
- Kashmiri
- Konkani
- Maithili
- Malayalam
- Meitei (Manipuri)
- Marathi
- Nepali
- Odia
- Punjabi
- Rajasthani
- Sanskrit
- Santali
- Sindhi
- Tamil
- Telugu
- Urdu
Sahitya Akademi Bal Sahitya Puraskar
- Assamese
- Bengali
- Bodo
- Dogri
- English
- Gujarati
- Hindi
- Kannada
- Kashmiri
- Konkani
- Maithili
- Malayalam
- Meitei (Manipuri)
- Marathi
- Nepali
- Odia
- Punjabi
- Rajasthani
- Sanskrit
- Santali
- Sindhi
- Tamil
- Telugu
- Urdu
Related
- Eighth Schedule to the Constitution of India
- Official Languages Commission
- List of languages by number of native speakers in India

Sahitya Akademi Translation Prizes are given each year to writers for their outstanding translations work in the 24 languages, since 1989.

== Recipients ==
Following is the list of recipients of Sahitya Akademi translation prizes for their works written in Santali. The award, as of 2019, consisted of ₹50,000.

Year	Translator	Title of the translation	Original Title	Original Language	Genre	Original Author	References
2008	No Award						
2009	No Award						
2010	Sobha Nath Beshra	Rahla Raybar	Meghadūta	Sanskrit	Poetry	Kalidasa	
2011	Thakurdas Murmu	Santal Pahra (Vol. I & II)	Santal Lokakatha (Vol. I & II)	Odia	Short Stories	Binod Bihari Das	
2012	Rabindranath Murmu	Ita Chetan Re lta	Iter Upar It	Bengali	Novel	Mahasweta Devi	
2013	Mangal Majhi (Murmu)	Malang Anal	Bhagya Chakra	Bengali	Play	Haradhan Adhikari	
2014	Saro Hansdah	Devdas	Devdas	Bengali	Novel	Sarat Chandra Chattopadhyay	
2015	Tala Tudu	Baplanij	Porineeta	Bengali	Novel	Sarat Chandra Chattopadhyay	
2016	Ganesh Thakur Hansda	Bhognadi Reyak Dahire	Bhagnadihir Mathre	Bengali	Novel	Panchu Gopal Bhaduri	
2017	Surya Singh Besra	Matkom Rasa	Madhushala	Hindi	Poetry	Harivansh Rai Bachchan	
2018	Rupchand Hansda	Sen Dareyak'an Menkhan Chedak	Jetepari Kintu Keno Jabo	Bengali	Poetry	Shakti Chattopadhyay	
2019	Kherwal Soren	Aikao	Anubhab	Bengali	Novel	Dibyendu Palit	
2020	Chandra Mohan Kisku	Sido-Kanhu Tikinak Hohote	Sidu - Kanhur Dake	Bengali	Novel	Mahasweta Devi	
2021	Damayanti Beshra	Shreegeetagovinda	Gita Govinda	Sanskrit	Classic Poetry	Jayadeva	
2022	Laxman Kisku	Merom Gupi Din	Aadu Jeevitham	Malayalam	Novel	Benyamin	
2023	Veer Pratap Murmu	Kira	Pratigya	Hindi	Novel	Premchand	
2024	Nazir Hembram	Hende Sadom	Kala Ghoda	Hindi	Novel	Nilotpal Mrinal	

== See also ==
- List of Sahitya Akademi Award winners for Santali
