= Bhaskaracharya Tripathi =

- Born: 1 July 1942 (age 84); Allahabad, Uttar Pradesh, India
- Citizenship: Indian
- Education: M.A., D.Phil.
- Alma mater: Allahabad University
- Occupation: Poet
- Writing career
- Language: Sanskrit
- Notable work: Nirjharini
- Notable awards: Sahitya Academy Award

Bhaskaracharya Tripathi, (Hindi: भास्कराचार्य त्रिपाठी), is a Sanskrit poet who was the recipient of the 2003 Sahitya Akademi Award for Sanskrit for his work Nirjharini.

== Early life and education ==
He was born on 1 July 1942 in Pandar, Jasra, Allahabad, Uttar Pradesh. He completed his M.A. and D.Phil. in Sanskrit at Allahabad University.

== Career ==
He was a Sanskrit professor in the Government Ramanand Sanskrit College in Bhopal and later became Chairman of the Shri Ekrasanand Adarsh Sanskrit Mahavidyalaya at Mainpuri in Uttar Pradesh. He started writing in 1958. He retired from the Dept. of Higher Education of Madhya Pradesh in 2004. He has been the founder Secretary of Madhya Pradesh Sanskrit Academy. He has more than 12 books to his credit and has delivered scholarly lectures in 24 seminars and conferences. He was the editor of Sanskrit literary magazine Durva, and presently edits Sanskrit Pratibha of Sahitya Academy, New Delhi. He was a part of the 13th World Sanskrit Conference held in Edinburgh, Scotland, and participated in the Kavisammelana. He was also a part of the 2005 All India Sanskrit Convention. He was the member of the first Academic council of the Mahatma Gandhi International Hindi University.

== Works ==
Bhaskaracharya Tripathi has written 12 books. Some of them are listed below.

- Ajaasati (Hindi Rupantaryukta Jantukathaamayam Sanskritkavy am) Nilimpkaavyam 4 Spandah
- Arinaashaka-Durgaasatakam (Pranetaa – Aachaarya Raamgulaam)
- Laghu-Raghu (Prathamaavatirna Sarvalaghu Sanskritakaavya Hindi Rupaantarasamanvitam)
- Saaketasaurabham (Mahaakaavyam)
- Akshara (Bhaskar Bharti)
- Baalaraamaayana (Rajasekhara Virachita Mahaanaataka) (2 Vols.)
- Nilimpa-Kaavyam (5 Vols.)
- Sanskrit ki Pahachaan

== Awards ==
He has received many awards, including the Nirjhariṇī Award by the Uttar Pradesh Sanskrit Academy for his work Mṛtkūṭam kāvyaśatam, the Paṃ jagannātha Award by the Delhi Sanskrit Academy, the Cārūdeva śāstrī award for his work Saṃskṛta jīvanam, Madhya Pradesh Sanskrit Academy's Bhoj Award for Bāla rāmāyaṇam and the Vachaspati Award by the K. K. Birla Foundation for Sāketa saurabham. He was also awarded the "Certificate of Honour" by the President of India Pratibha Devisingh Patil on 10 July 2008.

== See also ==
- List of Sahitya Akademi Award winners for Sanskrit – List of Sanskrit language writers who have won the Sahitya Akademi Award.

Awards
Preceded by Kashinath Mishra	Recipient of the Sahitya Akademi Award winners for Sanskrit; 2003	Succeeded by Kala Nath Shastry
Preceded by Acharya Ramyatanshukla	Recipient of the Vachaspati Award; 2006	Succeeded by Swami Rambhadracharya
