= Mithila Prasad Tripathi =

Poet

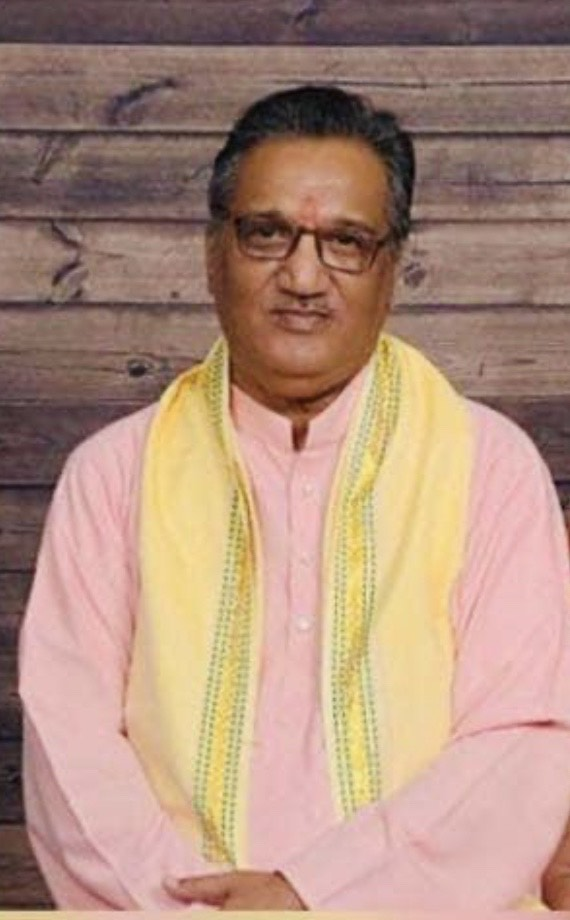
Mithila Prasad Tripathi

Mithila Prasad Tripathi is a Sanskrit poet who won the Sahitya Akademi Award for Sanskrit for 2010 for his poetry. The Sahitya Akademi is India's national academy of letters that awards the Jnanpith Award, India's highest literary award, and the Sahitya Akademi Award for each language is considered the second-highest literary award in India and the highest award for that language. He also won Rashtrapati Award in 2017, for his work in Sanskrit Language.

He was the director of Kalidasa Akademi in Ujjain from 2007 to 2010. He is also the chairman of Maharshi Patanjali Sanskrit Pratishthan, Bhopal, and was on the advisory board of the World Samskrit Book Fair held in January 2010. Additionally, he has served on the Madhya Pradesh Sanskrit Board and on the Board of Management of the Rashtriya Sanskrit Sansthan. On Independence Day 2013, he was awarded a Certificate of Honour by the president of India, for contribution to Sanskrit.

Prof. Tripathi also served as Vice Chancellor in Maharshi Panini Sanskrit University, Ujjain providing education in Mythological fields.

== Works ==
- Balmiki Aur Prakrat Apbhransh Ram Sahitya, 2009. ISBN 978-81-7844-050-7.
