= Kalika Prasad Shukla =

Sanskrit scholar and poet

Kalika Prasad Shukla (Sanskrit: कालिकाप्रसादशुक्लः) (born 15 October 1921 - 1993) was a Sanskrit scholar and poet based in Varanasi, Uttar Pradesh. He won the Sahitya Akademi Award for Sanskrit in the year 1986 for the epic poem Śrīrādhācaritamahākāvyam. He was the Head of Departments of Vedanga and Vyākaraṇa at the Sampurnanand Sanskrit University.

== Life ==
Kalika Prasad Shukla was born in the Mathia-Shukia village in Deoria district of Uttar Pradesh. He obtained the Navyavyakaranacharya, Nyaya Shastri and Kavyatirtha degrees in the traditional (Gurukula) system of Sanskrit learning. He then obtained the Acharya (Master of Arts) degree in Sanskrit from Agra University in 1957. In 1978, he obtained the degree of Vachaspti (DLitt) from the Sampurnanand Sanskrit University along with a Gold Medal.

From 1957 to 1968, he taught as a lecturer in the Baroda Sanskrit Mahavidyalaya under the Maharaja Sayajirao University. He joined the Sampurnanand Sanskrit University in 1968 and served there till his retirement in 1982. From 1968 to 1975 he served as a Lecturer, from 1975 to 1979 as a Reader, and from 1979 to 1982 as a Professor. He retired as the Head of Departments of Vedanga and Vyakarana. After retiring from the Sampurnanand Sanskrit University, he settled in Varanasi. He took his last breathe because of brain haemorrhage on 21 June 1993 in Varanasi as per his last wish.

== Major works ==
Kalika Prasad Shukla has authored fifteen books and more than 25 papers. His major works include−

=== Epic poem ===
- Śrīrādhācaritamahākāvyam (श्रीराधाचरितमहाकाव्यम्) (1986) – This is an epic poem in 13 cantos on the love life of Radha and Krishna. The entire poem is from the perspective of Radha. The work is epical in mode with hardly any dialogues. Madhura Bhakti is the main Rasa of the poem. There is detailed poetic description of nature including the land of Braja, the river Yamuna, the hamlets, cowherds, seasons, groves, sunrise, moonrise, flora and fauna, et cetera. The work received the Sahitya Akademi Award for Sanskrit in 1986 for its "innovative form, epical structure and devotional appeal".

=== Minor poem ===
- Sūryaśatakam (सूर्यशतकम्) (1983) – A poem of one hundred verses devoted to Surya.

=== Research ===
- Vaiyākaraṇānāmanyeṣāñca Matena Śabdasvarūpatacchaktivicāraḥ (वैयाकरणानामन्येषाञ्च मतेन शब्दस्वरूपतच्छक्तिविचारः) (1979)

=== Critical editions ===
- Paramalaghumañjūṣā (परमलघुमञ्जूषा) (1961) of Nagesha Bhatta.
- Kovidānandaḥ (कोविदानन्दः) (1963) of Ashadhara Bhatta.
- Citramīmāṃsā (चित्रमीमांसा) (1965) of Appayya Dikshita.
- Paribhāṣenduśekharaḥ (परिभाषेन्दुशेखरः) (1975) of Nagesha Bhatta.
- Vaiyākaraṇasiddhāntamañjūṣā (वैयाकरणसिद्धान्तमञ्जूषा) (1977) of Nagesha Bhatta.
- Kāśikāvṛttiḥ (काशिकावृत्तिः) (1985) of Vamana and Jayaditya. Six volumes of the commentary on Pāṇini's Aṣṭādhyāyī. With Dvarikadasa Shastri.

=== Commentaries ===
- The commentary Jyotsanā on the Paramalaghumañjūṣā.
- A commentary on the third canto of the Candraprabhācaritam.
- A commentary on the fifth canto of the Kumārasambhavam.

== Awards and recognition ==
=== Awards ===
- 1986. Vishishta Puraskar by the Sanskrit Akademy of Uttar Pradesh for outstanding contribution to Sanskrit literature.
- 1986. Sahitya Akademi Award for Sanskrit for the work Śrīrādhācaritamahākāvyam.

=== Recognition ===
Shukla is known for his creative writing skills and is acclaimed as a poet of great distinction. Roshen Dalal wrote that the Śrīrādhācaritamahākāvyam is a "rare, high quality Sanskrit works of the twentieth century." K. Krishnamoorthy wrote about him−

There are thousands like him proficient in Sanskrit, but few are real poets. ... it is very hard to find a writer who sticks to traditional canons with convictions and yet succeeds in producing a sustained poem of moderate length, rising above mediocrity and blends in his composition the ever-fresh longings of man for communication with the divine.

== Works cited ==
- Dalal, Roshen (2011). Hinduism: An Alphabetical Guide. New Delhi, India: Penguin Books India. ISBN 9780143414216.
- Lal, Mohan (2006). The Encyclopaedia Of Indian Literature – Volume Five (Sasay To Zorgot), Volume 5. New Delhi, India: Sahitya Akademi. ISBN 9788126012213.
- Bhattacharya, J N; Sarkar, Nilanjana, eds. (2004). Encyclopaedic Dictionary of Sanskrit Literature, Volume 1 (A–Dh) (First ed.). New Delhi, India: Global Vision Publishing House. ISBN 9788187746843.
- Tripathi, Radha Vallabh, ed. (2012). संस्कृतविद्वत्परिचायिका – Inventory of Sanskrit Scholars (PDF). New Delhi, India: Rashtriya Sanskrit Sansthan. ISBN 978-93-8611-185-2.
