= Prashasya Mitra Shastri =

Dr. Prashasya Mitra Shastri is a Sanskrit poet and author who won the Sahitya Akademi Award for Sanskrit in 2009 for his Anabheepsitam, a collection of short stories. He also won the Kalidas Puraskar awarded by the Madhya Pradesh government's Kalidas Sanskrit Akademi. The award includes a letter of commendation and a cash prize of Rs 51000. He won the award for his contributions to Sanskrit literature and the two story collections and a collection of poetry he published in the year 2007–08. He has also won awards from the Sahitya Academies of Delhi, Rajasthan and Uttar Pradesh. He was the organiser for a three-day Rishi Balidaan Samaaroh in memory of Dayanand Saraswati in Ajmer in 2009. He is especially known for his light verse and stories featuring satire and irony.

He has been in the Sanskrit Department at the Feroze Gandhi College, Raebareli since 1973, where he is currently a Reader.

== Books ==
- Narmada. Allahabad, 1997. With a foreword by Satya Vrat Shastri.
- Anabheepsitam: a selection of modern Sanskrit stories. Akshayavata Prakashan, Allahabad, 2007. 128 pages.
- Vyangyaarthakaumudi, 2010. Reviewed in Vakovakyam Sanskrit Research Journal, Vol. 4 Issue 5 (Oct 2010 – Mar 2011).
- Anāghrātaṃ Puṣpam
