= Om Prakash Pandey =

Poet

Dr. Om Prakash Pandey (also sometimes spelled as Om Prakash Pande), is a poet who won the Sahitya Akademi Award for Sanskrit in 2008.

He is a professor and head of the Sanskrit department at Lucknow University and has been visiting professor at Sorbonne Nouvelle University in Paris, and has also been visiting faculty in universities at Utrecht in the Netherlands, Torino in Italy, and Germany. Based on his experiences in France, he wrote a Sanskrit work Rasapriya Paris Rajadhani, published by Bharatiya Vidya Bhavan.

He is also affiliated to Maharishi Sandipani Rashtriya Veda Vidya Prasthistan, Ujjain, and was appointed by the government on a task force to document and preserve Vedic chanting forms, under UNESCO’s World (intangible) Heritage Preservation programme. They were inscribed on the UNESCO Intangible Cultural Heritage Lists in 2008. He has written a book on the Rudradhyaya of the Shankayana Shakha (branch) of the Rgveda.

In 2006 he was the victim of an assault by a student union leader demanding admission. He is from Ujjain, Madhya Pradesh, and has been writing since 1977.

== Works ==
- Vaidik Sahitya aur Samskriti ka swarup (in Hindi). Vishwa Prakashan (A unit of Wylie Eastern) 1994, New Delhi, ISBN 81-7328-037-1
- Rasapriya Paris Rajadhani (in Sanskrit). Bharatiya Vidya Bhavan.
- Rgvediya-Shankayana Rudradhyaya. Indira Gandhi National Centre for the Arts, 2009. ISBN 978-81-85503-15-8
- Sarva-Veda-Rudradhyaya Sangraha. 2006. ISBN 81-7081-626-2.
- Jivanaparvanatakam: Hariscandropakhyanadhrtammaulikam Samskrta-natakam (Sanskrit play on Harishchandra). Penman Publishers, 1998. ISBN 978-81-85504-28-5
- Vaishnav Aagam Ke Vaidik Aadhaar (in Hindi). 2005. ISBN 978-81-7081-621-8
- Drashtavya Jagat Ka Yatharth (in Hindi). Prabhat Prakashan. ISBN 978-81-7315-524-6.
- Atharvavediya Parishist Granthon Ka Parisheelan (with Smt. Dr. Anjul Dubey) Nag Publishers, 2005. ISBN 978-81-7081-623-2.
- Romance with Sanskrit - Sanskrit Subodha, Chowkhamba Sanskrit Series (C.S.St. 128).
- Rasapriyaa Vibhaavanam. Nag Publishers, 2005. ISBN 978-81-7081-613-3.
- Sadukti-karṇāmṛtam: with Hindi commentary, Chowkhamba Sanskrit Series Office, 2005.
- Ambika Dutt Vyas (Modern Sanskrit writer), Makers of Indian Literature series, 1993. ISBN 81-7201-502-X

Articles

- The other tradition of Sanskrit poetry: with special reference to the Saduktikarṇāmṛta in: Bulletin d'études indiennes 15, 1997, pp. 205–211
- Vedic Poetry: Experience at Multiple Levels. In Conversation: Prof. T. N. Dharmadhikari, Prof. G. C. Tripathi, and Prof. Om Prakash Pandey with Sudha Gopalakrishnan, in the September 2006 Issue of Kriti-Rakshana, the bi-monthly publication of the National Mission for Manuscripts
