= Harshadev Madhav =

Indian writer and poet

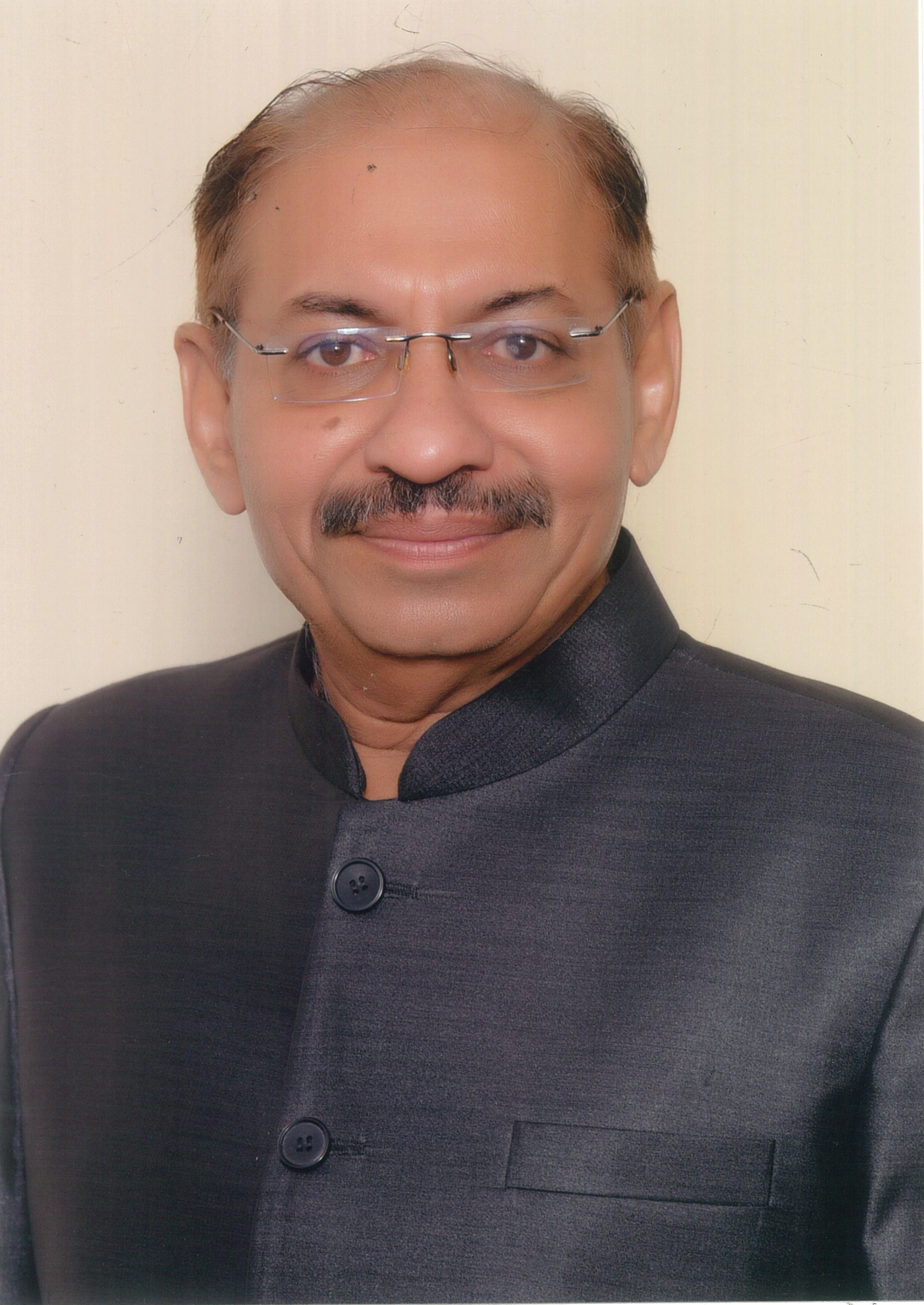
- Harshadev Madhav
- Born: Harshavadan Mansukhlal Jani; 20 October 1954 (age 71); Vartej, Bhavnagar, Gujarat, India
- Education: Master of Arts; Ph.D
- Alma mater: Saurashtra University; Gujarat University
- Occupations: poet, writer
- Spouse: Shruti Jani (1985 - present)
- Children: Rushiraj Jani
- Writing career
- Pen name: Harshadev Madhav
- Language: Sanskrit, Gujarati
- Years active: 1971 - present
- Period: Postmodern Gujarati literature
- Notable awards: Sahitya Akademi Award (2006)

Academic background
- Thesis: 'Mukhy Puranoma Shap ane Teno Prabhav'
- Doctoral advisor: Gautam Patel

Harshadev Madhav (born 20 October 1954) is a Sanskrit and Gujarati language poet and writer who won the Sahitya Akademi Award for Sanskrit in 2006 for his work of poetry, Tava Sparshe Sparshe. He had composed over 2200 poems in Sanskrit as of 1992.

== Early life ==
Harshavadan Mansukhlal Jani was born on 20 October 1954 in Vartej, a city in Bhavnagar district to Mansukhlal and Nandanben. He took his primary education from Vartej Primary School. He completed his high school education (old ssc) in 1971 from Koliyak Madhyamik Shala, Koliyak. He got his Bachelor of Arts as an external student from Saurashtra University in 1975. While working in a telegraph office in Palitana, he completed his Master of Arts in 1981 with Sanskrit from Saurashtra University with first rank, and subsequently became a lecturer at H. K. Arts College, Ahmedabad. He completed B.Ed in 1983 and Ph.D in 1990 from Gujarat University. He received Ph.D for his research work " Mukhya Puranoma Shap Ane Teno Prabhav" (Curse Element And Its Influence In Major Puranas).

He married Shruti Jani on 29 April 1985 and they have a son, Rushiraj Jani.

He participated in the Kavisammelana at the 13th World Sanskrit Conference, Edinburgh and the 14th World Sanskrit Conference, Kyoto.

== Work ==
He is credited with introducing Japanese Haiku and Tanka, and Korean Sijo, into Sanskrit poetry. Samir Kumar Datta puts in him the category of modernist or revolutionary Sanskrit poets, and says:

Harshadev Madhav is a modern poet in true sense of the term. He thinks that poetry should appeal first to intellect and thereafter to emotion. In the eternal controversy between intellectuality and emotionalism Harshadeva takes side of intellectuality […] Harshadev happens to be one of the most profound modern Sanskrit poets. He betrays the great influence exerted on him by modern vernacular poetry and some of the images carved out by modern vernacular poets.

== Recognition ==
- Kavilok Śisukāvya Prize (1979)
- Gujarat Sanskrit Academy Award in 1994
- Kalpavalli Award by Bharatiya Bhasha Parishad, Calcutta in 1997–98
- All-India Kalidas Award for 1997–98 for Nishkyantaha Sarve, awarded by the Madhya Pradesh Kalidas Akademi.
- Ramakrishna Sanskrit Award by Saraswati Vikasa Canada in 1998
- Sahitya Akademi Award for Tava Sparśe Sparśe in 2006
- Sahitya Gaurav Puraskar for 2010

== List of books ==
=== Sanskrit poetry collection ===
- Rathyāsu Jambuvarņāņām Širāņām (1985)
- Alakanandā (1990)
- Sabdānām Nirmaksikesu Dhvamsāvaseseşu (1993)
- Mṛgayā (1994)
- Lāvārasadigdhāh Swapnamayāḥ Parvatāh (1996)
- Bṛhannalā (Episode) (1995)
- Asicca Me Manasi (1996)
- Niskrāntāh Sarve (1997)
- Purā yatra Srotaḥ (1998)
- Kālośmi (1999)
- Mṛtyuśatakaṃ (1999)
- Suṣumņāyāṃ Nimagnā Naukā (1999)
- Bhāvasthirāņi Jananāntarasauhrdāni (2000)
- Kannakyā Kṣiptaṃ Māṇikyanūpuraṃ (2000-2001),
- Sudhāsíndhormadye (2002)
- Manaso Naimiņāraṇam (2004)
- Rşeh Kșubdhe Cetasi (2004)
- Tava Sparse sparse (2004)
- Bhati Te Bhāratam (2007)
- Sparsalajjākomalā Smrtih (2006)
- Tathāstu

=== Collections of Sanskrit-dramas ===
- Mrtyurayam Kastūrimrgośti (1998)
- Kalpavrkşah (2001)

=== Sanskrit Novel ===
- Mūko Rāmagirirbhūtvā (6/3/2008)

=== Book of Modern Sanskrit Criticism (in Sanskrit) ===
- Nakhadarpanah (8/2/2008)

=== Books of Criticism (in Gujarati) ===
- Mahākāvi Māgha (1993)
- Paurāņika Kathāo Ane Akhayāno (1997)
- Sanskrit Samakālina Kavitā
- Nakhānām Pāņdityam (1998)
- Nakhacihna (2001)

=== Collected Poems ===
- Head Lines Again (1999) (English)
- Paksi ke pankha Para Gagan (1999) (Hindi)
- Alakananda aur Anyānya Kavita (oriya) by Bibekananda Panigrahi (2004)
- Smrtiyon ki Jirņa Śrāvastā Nagarimen (Hindi) (2008)
- Buddhasya Bhiksāpatre (Hindi) (2008-2009)

=== Translated work ===
- Sanskritanun Bhāṣāstriya Adhyayana (translation of a book by Bholashankar Vyas)

=== Books edited ===
- Sanskrit Sahityamāņ Mahātmā Gāndhi (1999)
- Rturāja Vasanta (2006)
- Āpaņāņ Varşākāvyo (2006)
- Pșthavinā Premano Paryāya : Patni (2008)
- Parama Tattva Siva (2003)
- Vaicārika Krātinā paripreksyamān Sanskrit Sāhitya (2006)
- Sanskrit Sāhitya Ane Cosatha Kalão (2006)
- Sanskrit Sāhitymāņ Ādhyātmikatā ane Jivanadarśana bor
- Sanskrit Sāhityamān Sāmājika Cetanā

=== Books of research on 'Tantra-śāstra' ===
- Mantranāņ Rahasyo, Mantroddhāra ane Yantrasiddhio (2003)
- Śakta Tantramāņ Srividyanāņ Rahasyo (2006)
- Sri Sukta, Sriyantra ane Śrividhyā (2007)
- Pratyaksa Brahma : Ganesa

=== Hindi Poetry Collection ===
- Tanhaiyon Ki Paravarisa (2008)

=== Gujarati Poetry Collections ===
- Hāth Phamphose Āndhala Sugandhane (1985)
- Pāna Saranāmuṇ Na Jāņe Jhādanun Ā Deśamāņ (1997)
- Mobilenun Bhūta (2006)
- Kalpavrksani Lekhaņa Laine (2006)

=== Collection of Gujarati Short Stories ===
- Ksaņaswapna (2000)

=== Books on Sanskrit Grammar ===
- Vyāvaharika Sanskrit Vyākaraṇa (1995)
- Upasarga, Chirūpa, Nāmadhātu ane Krdanta vicāra (1996)
- Kārakavicāra (1998)
- Lakāravicāra (2001)
- Sandhi ane Samāsa Vicara (2003)
- Sanskrit Siksika (by Kamlashankar Trivedi) (2004)
- Kr, 'Bhū' ane 'As'nā Prayogo ane anuprayogo (2007)

=== Dictionaries ===
- Pārsva picture Dictionary (2000)
- Śri Vāni Citraśabdakośa (2001)
- Sacitra Amarakośa

=== Books on teaching and learning Conversational Sanskrit ===
- Sanskritani Ābohavamān (1993)
- Sanskritanā Varsādamān (1996)
- Sanskritnā Upavanamān (1998)
- Sanskritnā Nagamāņ (2001)
- Sanskrit Bhāsā kausalyam (2006)
- Sanskritvāgvyavahāra (2004)

=== Edited works ===
- Sanskrita Sahityamān Mahātmā Gāndhi (1998)
- Kādambari (2000)
- Amruśatakam (1996)

=== Criticism on Sanskrit Sastras ===
- Dharmaśāstrano Paricayātmaka Itihāsa (with Rushiraj Jani)
- Bharatanun Rasasūtra Rūpakanā Prākāro Dwani Siddhānta ane dwaninā prakaro (2006)

=== Co-Edited books ===
- Kāvyaprakāśa (1990)
- Gangālahari (1990)
- Naisadhiyacaritam (1991)
- Řgveda - Mandal X (1992)
- Karnabhāram (1994)
- Buddhacaritam (third canto) 1993
- Ratnāvali (1993)
- Sundarakāndam (1993)
- Kathopanisada (1994)
- Mundakopanisada (1994)
- Sāundarnadam Canto 3 and 4 (1994)
- Sanskrit Sāhityano Itihāsa (1999)
- Manusmrti (Book 6) (1997)
- Santavilāsa ane karuņavilāsa (2001)
- Kāsambari - Sukanasopadeśah (2004
- Jātakamāla (2005–2006)
- Vaidika Suktamanjūsā (2005)
- Vaidikavanamaya (2008)

=== Books for children literature ===
- Gāgaramā Sāgara (1999)
- Purāņoni Vārtāo (1999)
- Ekatā Jhindābāda (2003)
- Dākaņano Dara (2005)
