= Rewa Prasad Dwivedi =

Sanskrit poet (1935–2021)

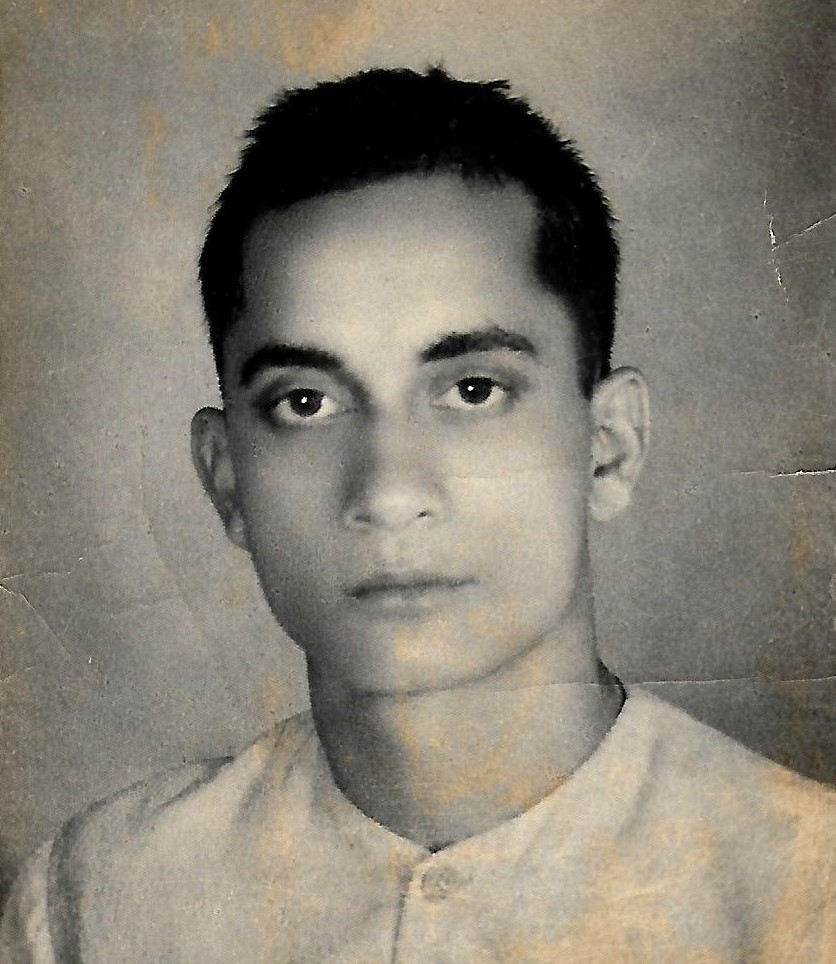
- Born: 22 August 1935; Nadner, Gwalior State, British India
- Died: 21 May 2021 (aged 85); Varanasi, Uttar Pradesh, India
- Citizenship: India
- Education: Acharya and M.A.-Sanskrit (Banaras Hindu University); Ph.D. (Ravi Shankar University, 1965); D.Litt. (Jabalpur University, 1974)
- Occupations: Writer; educator; critic
- Writing career
- Language: Sanskrit
- Genres: Poetry, plays, prose, literary scholarship
- Notable awards: President's Award for Lifetime Achievement (1978); Mahamahopadhyaya P. V. Kane Gold Medal (1983); Srivani Alamkarana (1999); Kabir Samman for outstanding contribution to Indian Poetry (2017)

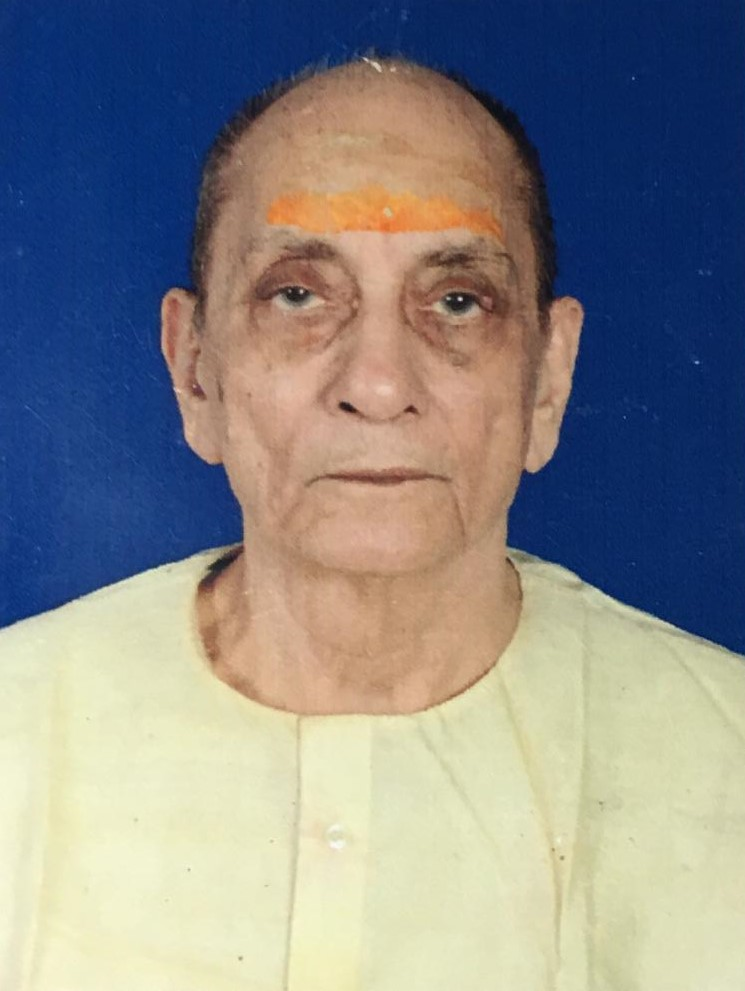
Rewa Prasad Dwivedi (September 2019)

Rewa Prasad Dwivedi (22 August 1935 – 21 May 2021) was a Sanskrit scholar, poet, writer, teacher, and critic. His original works include poetry as epics and lyrics, plays, and prose. He wrote the new literature under the pseudonym "sanatana", meaning 'the eternal'. He is also known as 'Acharya' Dwivedi ('the scholar' or 'the expert' Dwivedi).

Dwivedi's scholarship includes work on literary principles including modern theories in Sanskrit poetics and dramaturgy and preserving (editing, compiling, indexing, and republishing) the works of all major Sanskrit scholars.

== Early life and education ==
Rewa Prasad Dwivedi was born in Nadner (22 August 1935);), on the banks of the Narmada River in Madhya Pradesh, to Pandit Narmada Prasad Dwivedi and Lakshmi Devi. He was orphaned when he was about eight years old. After completing basic education in Sanskrit in Madhya Pradesh, he traveled as a teenager to Varanasi to study Sanskrit at Banaras Hindu University. Despite poverty, he excelled in Sanskrit language and literature in both the traditional system at Faculty of Sanskrit Vidya Dharma Vijnan, and modern system at Faculty of Arts at Banaras Hindu University. His primary teacher and mentor was Pandit Mahadev Shastri. Dwivedi obtained a Sahityacharya title and a M.A. degree in Sanskrit from Banaras Hindu University. He received a PhD from Ravi Shankar University, Raipur, in 1965, and a D.Litt. from Jabalpur University in 1974.

Dwivedi's main area of work is in Sanskrit Sahitya (literature), but he was an expert in the Sanskrit language disciplines of Navya-nyaya (logic), Darshana (philosophy), and Vyakarana (grammar), as well as the scripts of Brahmi, Sarada and Nagari.

== Career ==
Dwivedi was emeritus professor of Sanskrit at the Banaras Hindu University, Varanasi, India, where he taught Sanskrit Literature from 1969 to 1995. He was Dean, Faculty of Sanskrit Vidya and Dharm Vijnan for three 2-year terms between 1979 and 1989, and multi-term Head of the Sanskrit Literature Department at this faculty. He was also a Member of Banaras Hindu University's Executive Council as well as its Academic Council. Before joining Banaras Hindu University, he taught Sanskrit literature in various roles in India's central state Madhya Pradesh's colleges in Raipur and Indore. Dwivedi has served on various national policy-making bodies for Sanskrit education in India.

In the early 1980s, Dwivedi organized the World Sanskrit Conference at Banaras Hindu University. He traveled to the US, Canada, and Europe to participate in other World Sanskrit Conferences as part of Government of India's delegation, American Oriental Society Meeting, and in personal capacity to conduct manuscript reviews at institutions such as Harvard University's Houghton Library.

Dwivedi was the founder of a non-profit institution Kalidas Sansthan in Varanasi. This institute has published books in Sanskrit literature. After retiring from official role at Banaras Hindu University, Dwivedi continued to read, research and create literature daily in his personal study and library, where he also taught students from the nearby campus of Banaras Hindu University free of charge.

== Biographical sketches ==
Acharya Dwivedi has been the subject of several biographies and PhD theses, as part of United States Library of Congress South Asia literary project, two documentaries by Indian literary institutions and several social media recordings.

- Sanatanasya kavyavaibhavam ('the glory of sanatana's literature'): a Sanskrit monograph on Acharya Dwivedi, published by Rashtriya Sanskrit Sansthan, depicting salient nature of his works on Sanskrit poetics.
- Sanskrit Sahitya ke Vatvriksha ('the banyan tree of sanskrit literature'): A compilation of various perspectives on Acharya Dwivedi's works, life and contributions. A volume released at a 2018 National Symposium on Acharya Dwivedi, organized by Indira Gandhi National Center for the Arts.
- Dr. Rewa Prasad Dwivedi, Vyaktitva and Krititva ('personality and creativity of Rewa Prasad Dwivedi'): a book on the life and creativity of Acharya Dwivedi's works, basis of a PhD thesis at University of Rajasthan, Jaipur, India, 1991.
- Arvācīna Saṃskr̥ta mahākāvya-paramparā meṃ Revāprasāda Dvivedī ke mahākāvya: a 2016 book describing 'Rewaprasad Dwivedi's epics in the modern tradition of Sanskrit epics'.
- The United States Library of Congress has captured Acharya Dwivedi's works, and recordings on its South Asian Literary Recording Project in 2016.
- Two of India's premier national institutions, Sahitya Akademi and Indira Gandhi National Center for the Arts, have each prepared full-length documentaries on Acharya Dwivedi's life sketch and literary contributions in 2017 and 2018, respectively.
- Social media has several recordings of Acharya Dwivedi's speeches and life, as well as reviews by others, in Sanskrit and Hindi.

== Works ==
Dwivedi's literary efforts fall into three major categories: original literature, new literary principles and theorems, and preservation of past literature for future generations. Dwivedi had written over 13,000 verses in 3 epics and 14 lyrics, 2 plays, and 5 books on his original new theories on Sanskrit literary principles and theorems. No other Sanskrit literature scholar is known to have made more original contributions.

== Selected publications ==
=== Epics ===
- Dwivedi, Rewa Prasad (1968). Sītācaritam (in Hindi). Saṃskr̥tapariṣad, Sāgaraviśvavidhyālayaḥ; Sudhīraprakāśanam, Rāyapuram.
- Dwivedi, Rewa Prasad (1990). Svātantryasaṃbhavam: 28 sargātmakaṃ mahākāvyam, 1857-1984 gato Bhāratetihāsaḥ (in Hindi). Kālidāsa Saṃsthānam.
- Dwivedi, Rewa Prasad; Dvivedī, Sadāśivakumāra (2002). Kumāravijayamahākāvyam (in Hindi). Kālidāsasaṃsthānam.

=== Lyrics ===
- Dwivedi, Rewa Prasad; Dvivedī, Sadāśivakumāra (2003). Śrīrevābhadrapīṭham: 152 padyātmakaḥ Śrīnarmadāstavaḥ (in Hindi). Kālidāsa Saṃsthāna.
- Dwivedi, Rewa Prasad (2002). Śaraśayyā (in Hindi). Kālidāsasaṃsthānam.
- Dwivedi, Rewa Prasad (1988). Pramathaḥ: paramāṇuyugīyāni nava kāvyāni (in Hindi). Kālidāsa Saṃsthānam.
- Dwivedi, Rewa Prasad (1987). Śatapatram: kavitāviṣayakaṃ Saṃskr̥tapadyaśatakam (in Hindi). Kālidāsasaṃsthānam.
- Dwivedi, Rewa Prasad (2001). Matāntaram: yugāntaranāndī (in Hindi). Kālidāsasaṃsthānam.
- Dwivedi, Rewa Prasad (2000). Śakaṭāram: mānavapratāḍanākāvyam (in Hindi). Kālidāsasaṃsthānam.
- Dwivedi, Rewa Prasad (2001). Sarabhaṅgam: adhyātmarahasyakāvyam (in Hindi). Kālidāsa Saṃsthānam.

=== Plays ===
- Dwivedi, Rewa Prasad (2000). Saptarṣikāṅgresam: daśāṅkaṃ nāṭakam (in Hindi). Kālidāsasaṃsthānam.
- Dwivedi, Rewa Prasad (1976). Yūthikā (in Hindi). Saṃskr̥taprakāśanam.

=== New literary concepts ===
- Dwivedi, Rewa Prasad (1977). Kāvyālaṅkārakārikā: Abhinavaṃ kāvyaśāstram (in Sanskrit). Caukhambā Surabhāratī Prakāśana.
- "Alam Brahma by Rewaprasada Dwivedi at Vedic Books". www.vedicbooks.net.

=== Preservation of literature ===
Critical editions, reviews, translations, and commentaries on the works of past scholars of Sanskrit literature:

- Kālidāsa; Dwivedi, Rewa Prasad (1986). Kālidāsa-granthāvalī (in Hindi). Kāśī-Hindū-Viśvavidyālayaḥ.
- Dwivedi, Rewa Prasad and Sadashiv Kumar (2017). Kalidas-Shabdanukramkoshah. Varanasi, India: Kalidasa Sansthan, Varanasi. p. 740. ISBN 978-8192642796.
- "Journal of the Asiatic Society of Mumbai". asiaticsociety.org.in.
- Dwivedi, Rewa Prasad (1973). Kālidāsaḥ, mānavaśilpī mahākaviḥ (in Hindi). Saṃskr̥tapariṣad, Sāgaraviśvavidyālayaḥ.
- Kālidāsa; Dwivedi, Rewa Prasad; Aruṇagirinātha; Nārāyaṇapaṇḍita; Viśvavidyālaya, Sampūrṇānanda Saṃskr̥ta (2004). Kālidāsapraṇītaṃ Kumārasambhavamahākāvyam (in Hindi). Sampūrṇānanda Saṃskr̥ta Viśvavidyālaya. ISBN 9788172701246.
- Hemādri; Kālidāsa; Dwivedi, Rewa Prasad (1973). Raghuvaṃśadarpaṇaḥ (in Hindi). Kāśīprasādajāyasavāla-anuśīlanasaṃsthānanideśakena.
- Kālidāsa; Dwivedi, Rewā Prasāda (1990). The Rt̥usaṃhāra of Kālidāsa. Sahitya Akad. ISBN 978-81-7201-019-5.
- Dwivedi, Rewa Prasad (2007). संस्कृतकाव्यशास्त्र को आलोचनात्मक इतिहास: 300 ई. पू. से 2005 ई. सन् तक (in Hindi). कालिदाससंस्थान. ISBN 9788171245437.
- श्रृंगारप्रकाशः [साहित्यप्रकाशः], ग्रंथकृद, भोजराजः: Shringar Prakasha (Set of 2 Volumes).
- Dwivedi, Rewa Prasad Dwivedi & Sadashiv Kumar (2014). SAhityashastrasamucchaya Vol.- I - Dandi, Bhamah, Udbhat, Vaman, Rudrat - Original Edited Texts. Kalidas Sansthan, 28 Mahamanpuri, PO- BHU, Varanasi - 221005.
- Dwivedi, REwa Prasad Dwivedi and Sadashiv Kumar (2013). Sahityashastrasamucchaya Vol.- II - Dhvanyaloka of Anandavardhan with Lochana of Abhinavagupta. Kalidas Sansthan, 28 Mahamanpuri, PO- BHU, Varanasi - 221005.
- Mahimabhaṭṭa; Ruyyaka; Dwivedi, Rewa Prasad (1964). Vyakttivivekaḥ (in Hindi). Caukhambā Saṃskr̥ta sīrīja āphisa.
- अलंकार सर्वस्व: Alamkara Sarvasva.
- Dwivedi, Rewa Prasad (1972). Ānandavardhana: Ācārya Ānandavardhana ke kāvyaśāstrīya siddhānta-krama, punarnirdhāraṇa, cintana (in Hindi). Madhyapradeśa Hindī Grantha Akādamī.
- "Buy Bharata's Natyasastra online - Indian Institute of Advanced Study". books.iias.org.
- "संस्कृतभारती | Samskrita Bharati". www.samskritabharati.in.
- अभिधावृत्तमातृका : Abhidhavrttamatrka By Rajanka Mukula.
- Mammaṭācārya (1981). Kāvyaprakāśaḥ (in Sanskrit). Kāśīhindūviśvavidyālayaḥ.
- Śiṅgabhūpāla; Dwivedi, Rewa Prasad (1969). Śiṅgabhūpālapraṇīto Rasārṇavasudhākaraḥ (in Hindi). Saṃskr̥tapariṣad, Sāgaraviśvavidyālayaḥ.

== Awards and honours ==
Dwivedi is the youngest winner of Certificate of Honour by President of India (1978), at age 43. He won the Sahitya Akademi Award for Sanskrit, three Ratna awards and the P.V. Kane Gold Medal from The Asiatic Society of Mumbai. The Asiatic Society of Mumbai also awarded Dwivedi its Honorary Fellowship.

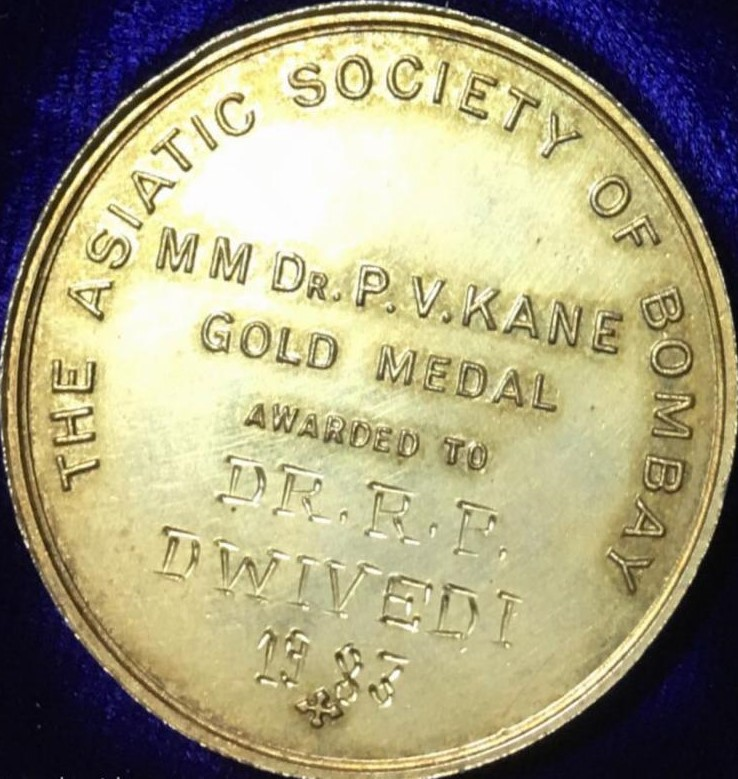
Mahamahopadhyaya PV Kane Gold Medal awarded to Acharya Dwivedi by the historic Asiatic Society of Mumbai, 1983.

=== International awards ===
- Mahamahopadhyaya P. V. Kane Gold Medal, The Asiatic Society of Mumbai, 1983.
- Honorary Fellowship by The Asiatic Society of Mumbai, 1995.
- Srivani Alamkarana by Ramkrishna Jayadayal Dalmia Shrivani Nyas, New Delhi, 1999. Bestowed by the Prime Minister Atal Bihari Bajpayee
- Vishwabharati Award, Uttar Pradesh Sanskrit Sansthan, Lucknow 2005.

=== National awards ===
- Certificate of Honour by President of India, Honorable Neelam Sanjeev Reddy in 1978: the highest literary award for lifetime achievement in Sanskrit, youngest ever recipient.
- Sahitya Akademi Award, Sahitya Akademi, New Delhi, 1991.
- Kalpavalli Puraskar, by Bharatiya Bhasa Parishad, Calcutta, 1993.
- Vacaspati Puraskar, by K.K. Birla Foundation, New Delhi, 1997.
- Honorary Emeritus Fellowship, by University Grants Commission, New Delhi, 1991–1993.
- Rashtriya Sanskrit Veda Vyasa Puraskar of 2005, conferred by University Grants Commission, New Delhi, 2010.
- Nana Saheb Peshwa Dharmika and Adhyatmika Puraskara, Devadeveshvara Sansthana, Pune, 2010.
- Maharsi Vedavyasa Samman, Delhi Sanskrit Academy, New Delhi, 2012.
- Sauharda Samman, Uttar Pradesh Hindi Sansthan, Lucknow, 2015.
- Kabir Samman, Highest Literary Honor of Govt. of Madhya Pradesh, Ministry of Culture for outstanding contribution to Indian Poetry, awarded by India's President Mahamahim Ramnath Kovind, Bhopal, 2017.

=== State and local awards ===
- Four times Sahitya Puraskara, Uttar Pradesh Sanskrit Sansthan, Lucknow, 1975, 1979, 1980,1982.
- Vishista Puraskar, Uttar Pradesh Sanskrit Sansthan, Lucknow, 2002.
- Valmiki Puraskara, Uttar Pradesh Sanskrit Sansthana, 2004.
- Karpatraswami Puraskar, Sampoornanand Sanskrit University, Varanasi, 2018.

=== Honorary titles ===
- Sahitya Ratna, from Jagadguru Shankaracharya of Kanchi Peetha Swami Jayendra Sarasvati, 2010.
- Pandita Ratna, from Shri Ramabhadracharya Vikalanga Vishvavidyalaya, Chitrakuta, 2008.
- Ratna Sadasya, the highest honorary fellowship of Kalidasa Sanskrit Akademi, Ujjain 2007.
- Mahamahopadhyaya, by Shri Lalabahadura Shastri Kendriya Sanskrit Vidyapeetha, New Delhi, 2009.
- Sastrakalanidhi, at the Centenary Celebrations of the Madras Sanskrit College, Madras, 2006.
- Prajnanabharati from Shri Satyananad Devayatan, Yadavapur, Kolkata, 2011.
- Vagyoga Samman, Vagyoga Chetana Peetham, Varanasi, 2015.
- Sanskritavidvadgauravam, BAPS Swaminarayan Shodh Sansthan Akshardham, New Delhi, 2019.
