= Hari Dutt Sharma =

Hari Dutt Sharma is a Sanskrit poet who won President certificate of honor in 2015 and the Sahitya Akademi Award for Sanskrit in 2007 for his work of poetry, Lasallatika.

He was awarded with "Mahrishi Vyas Puruskar" from Uttar Pradesh Sanskrit Sansthaan, and awarded by the then Governor of Uttar Pradesh on 7-Feb-2018. He was born in rangas village of Himachal Pradesh.

He was reappointed as Professor at Allahabad University India in 2014. He was earlier Professor and Head of the Sanskrit Department at the University of Allahabad. when he retired in June 2013, he was the visiting professor of Sanskrit at Silpakorn University in Bangkok, Thailand. He has been nominated as UGC-nominated Member several times.

== Works ==
Books

- Glimpses of Sanskrit Poetics and Poetry, Raka Prakashan. ISBN 81-88216-60-7
1. Saṃskṛta - Kāvyaśāstrīya Bhāvon kā Manovaijñānika Adhyayana (Critical work on Sanskrit Poetics). Chaukhamba Orientalia, Varanasi/Delhi, 1983.
2. Nibandh-Nikunjam (Essay book). Narayana Publishing House, Allahabad, 1983.
3. Gītakandalikā (Creative work on Sanskrit lyrics). Ganganath Jha Kendriya Sanskrit Vidyapeetha, Allahabad, 1983.
4. Tripathagā (Creative work on Sanskrit plays). Anjaneya Prakashan Allahabad, 1987.
5. Utkalikā (Creative work on Sanskrit lyrics). Anjaneya Prakashan, Allahabad, 1989.
6. Bālagītālī (Creative work on child literature). Anjaneya Prakashan, Allahabad, 1991.
7. Ākrandanam (Creative work on Sanskrit plays) Anjaneya Prakashan, Allahabad, 1998.
8. Ādhunika Saṃskṛta -Laghukāvya (A chapter in the 7th volume on the History of Modern Sanskrit Literature.). Uttar Pradesh Sanskrit Sansthan, Lucknow, 2000.
9. Lasallatikā (Creative work on Sanskrit lyrics) Raka Prakashan, Allahabad, 2004.
10. ‘Gadya-khanḍah’(‘Saṃskṛta-Sūkti-Samuccayah’ 18th volume), Delhi Sanskrit Academy, Delhi, 2005-06.
11. ‘Navekșikā’-(Creative work on Sanskrit lyrics) Raka Prakashan, Allahabad, 2014.

Editing of the Books

1. Saṃskṛta memׂ Vijñāna evam Vaiñānika Tattva, Proceedings of the Seminar, Sanskrit Department, University of Allahabad, 2006.
2. Perspectives on Comparative Religion, Proceedings of the Seminar, University of Allahabad, Vishwavidyalaya Prakashan, Sagar, 2008.

Articles

- A Psychological Study of Bhāvas in Sanskrit poetics (1972)
- "A Psychological Analysis of vibhāva" in Annals of the Bhandarkar Oriental Research Institute, Volume 63 (1983)
- The Concept of Symbolism and Sanskrit Poetry, in 13th World Sanskrit Conference, Edinburgh, July 2006
- The Concept of Poetry in Modern Sanskrit Poetics, in 14th World Sanskrit Conference, Kyoto, September 2009, Section 6 - Poetry, Drama and Aesthetics
- Sentiment, embellishment and metrical arrangement in Sanskrit poetry, Indologica Taurinensia: Journal of the International Association of Sanskrit Studies
- Impact of Indian mythology on Thai archaeology in Sanskrit in Southeast Asia : the harmonizing factor of cultures, International Sanskrit Conference, Bangkok, 2003. ISBN 974-641-045-8
- Culture and Religion along Confluence of Rivers, in 3rd SSEASR Conference, Bali, Indonesia, June 2009
