= Jagannath Pathak =

Sanskrit scholar and poet

Jagannath Pathak is a Sanskrit scholar and poet. In 1981 his poetry collection Kapishayani won the Sahitya Akademi Award for Sanskrit. He also won the Sahitya Akademi Translation Prize (for Sanskrit) in 2004, for translating Mirza Ghalib's Diwan-E-Ghalib Urdu poetry into Sanskrit as Ghaliba Kavyam.
