= Shridhar Bhaskar Warnekar =

Dr. Shridhar Bhaskar Warnekar (31 July 1918 – 18 April 2007) was a Sanskrit scholar born in Nagpur, India. His parents were Annapurna Warnekar and Bhaskar Rao Warnekar. He wrote many Sanskrit poems and verses, the most famous among them being "ShriShivarajyodayam". This Mahakavya is prescribed by Union Public Service Commission of India in the syllabus of Sanskrit Literature paper kept for Civil service examination. This work, which won the Sahitya Akademi Award for Sanskrit in 1974, is an epic poem in 68 cantos on the life and work of Shivaji.

Warnekar won a number of literary awards including Presidents Award, Kalidasa Puraskar, Birla foundation Saraswati Sammana, etc. and was invited by the State University of New York at New Paltz, United States to address their Sanskrit Seminar.

The title of Prajñā-Bhāratī (प्रज्ञाभारती) was conferred on him by Jagdguru Shri Shankarachrya.
