= Malchand Tiwari =

Indian poet, writer and translator in Rajasthani and Hindi

Malchand Tiwari is a poet, writer and translator in Rajasthani and Hindi. He is an executive member of Sahitya Akademi (Academy of Literature). He has served for many literary institutes of national and international reputation.

== Works ==
He has written Paryaywachi, Bholavan and short stories collections including Panidar, Sukant Ke Sapno Mein, Jaliyan Aur Jharokhe, Tran, Dhadand and Celebration. His collection of Rajasthani poems, Utrayo Hai Abho received the Sahitya Akademi Award.

He has also translated H. G. Wells’ Time Machine in Hindi.

== Awards ==
He has been awarded by Sahitya Akademi, Delhi for his poetry "Utaryo Hai Abho" in 1997. He has also been awarded with Ganeshilal Vyas 'Ustad' Padhya Puraskar, Dr. L P Tessitory Gadhya Puruskar and Suryamal Misan Sikhar Puraskar. He has been awarded by the Ramniwa Asharani Lakhotiya Trust the 15th Lakhotia Award.

== Yoga ==
Shri Malchand Tiwari has been practicing yoga since 1978. Since 1991, he has also been teaching Indian mythology and yoga scriptures. In the year 2007, YogaLife Foundation has awarded him grandfathering. Since 2000, he has also been an academic director in YogaLife Foundation.
