= Mahesh Chandra Sharma Gautam =

Indian scholar, novelist and poet

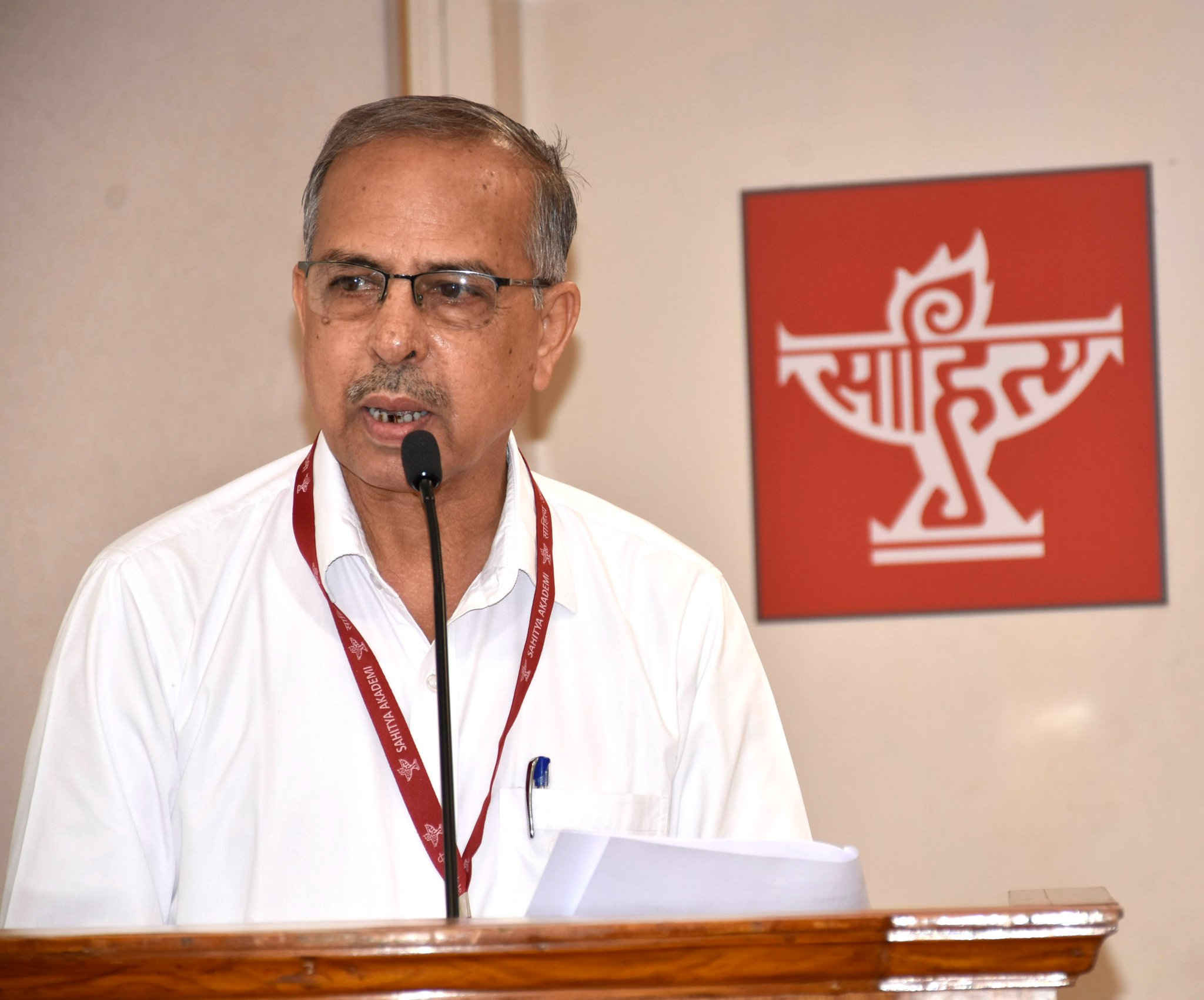
- Gautam in 2021
- Born: 24 December 1949 (age 76); Patiala, Punjab, India
- Education: M.A. in Sanskrit Panjab University; Ph.D. in Sanskrit Punjabi University
- Occupations: Scholar; novelist; educator
- Spouse: Kusum Lata (1968–present)
- Children: 3 (Daughters)
- Writing career
- Subject: Sanskrit literature
- Notable work: Vaishali (2017)
- Notable awards: Sahitya Akademi Award
- Website: maheshchandragautam.wordpress.com

Mahesh Chandra Sharma Gautam (born 24 December 1949) is an Indian scholar, novelist, poet, and retired educator known for his contributions to Sanskrit and Hindi literature. His work spans novels, epic poetry, and biographies. He received the Sahitya Akademi Award in 2020 for his Sanskrit novel Vaishali (2017) recognised for its literary merit by Rashtriya Sahitya Sansthan. He is the first individual from Punjab to win the Sahitya Akademi Award for Sanskrit literature.

== Early life and education ==
Mahesh Chandra Sharma Gautam was born on 24 December 1949 in Patiala, Punjab to Pandit Baldev Krishan Shastri and Krishna Devi. He was the youngest of five children and had four older sisters.

Gautam's early exposure to writing was shaped by his grandfather, Pandit Ramanand Sharma, who taught him to trace letters in ash spread on the ground. He was later introduced to Sanskrit grammar by his father, Pt. Baldev Krishan Shastri, a noted Sanskrit scholar. He studied at the Punjab Institute of Oriental & Indian Languages, Patiala (PIOIL), under Acharya Durga Dutt Vagmi and received the title of Shastri.

Gautam earned a M.A. in Sanskrit and an M.A. in Hindi from Panjab University, as a private candidate. He completed his Ph.D. in Sanskrit at Punjabi University, Patiala, with a thesis titled Punjab Ka Sanskrit Kavya Ko Yogdan (Contribution of Punjab to Sanskrit Poetry), supervised by Prof. Abhimanyu Malik.

== Career ==
Gautam began his teaching career in 1968 at the age of 19 as a Sanskrit teacher at K.K. High School, Rajpura, and later served as a Hindi lecturer at several institutions, including Government Girls Senior Secondary School, Cheeka, Haryana, retiring in 2007.

He was appointed to the Board of Studies in Sanskrit (Undergraduate) at Guru Nanak Dev University, Amritsar, from 2020 to 2022, and was appointed a member of the Board of Control for Sanskrit for 2025–2026.

He chaired a seminar on Guru Gobind Singh's life and philosophy in 2017 at the same university and delivered talks on All India Radio and Jalandhar Doordarshan, promoting Sanskrit and Hindi literature.

== Personal life ==
Gautam married Kusum Lata on 7 November 1968, the couple has three daughters. Their eldest daughter, Mukta Sharma, holds master's degrees in Sanskrit and English, as well as a PhD in Sanskrit, and is married to Sanjay Sharma, a doctor based in Jind. The middle daughter, Shruti Sharma, also earned an MA and a PhD in Sanskrit and is married to Yogender Singh Joshi, a chartered accountant. The youngest, Smriti Sharma, serves as a Deputy Superintendent at the Punjab and Haryana High Court and is a poet, married to Jitendra, a businessman.

== Literary contributions ==
Gautam's works span Sanskrit and Hindi, covering novels, epic poetry, and biographies. His notable publications include:

• Vaishali (2017, Sanskrit novel, published by Haryana Sahitya and Sanskriti Akademi): A critically acclaimed work exploring marital issues, awarded the Sahitya Akademi Award in 2020.

• Sunayana (2019, Sanskrit novel): Honored with the Kalidas Award (Punjab Government) and Banabhatta Award (Uttar Pradesh Sanskrit Sansthan) in 2020.

• Swatantrya Samar (2013, Sanskrit epic poem): Received the Gyani Sant Singh Best Book Award in 2014.

• Adhura Aadmi (2014, Hindi novel): Awarded the Sudarshan Best Book Award in 2015.

• Maharham Ratnambedkarah (2020, Sanskrit biography): A biography of Dr. B.R. Ambedkar.

• Kshitij Ki Talash (2021, Hindi novel): Received the Dr. Sugan Chand Bhatia Award from the All India Senior Citizens Confederation, Mumbai, in 2021.

• Maa Veera Vismrita Bhoovan (2025, Sanskrit, published by Central Sanskrit University, Delhi): a 531-page Sanskrit prose which chronicles the valor of Indian soldiers in conflicts from 1947 to 2019.

Launched on 28 June 2025, at the World Sanskrit Conference in Kathmandu under the oversight of Vice-Chancellor Shrinivas Varkhedi, the book has garnered significant attention, though Gautam was unable to attend the event.

His other works include Aruna, Neerja, Suprabhatam Pratikshyate, Mookam Nimantranam, Shri Guru Nanak Dev Charit, Aise Jiya Jata Hai, Bikharte Rishte, and Digbhrant Man. His publications have been supported by institutions like the Rashtriya Sanskrit Sansthan and the Indian Council of Historical Research.

== Awards and recognition ==
In 2020, Gautam became the first individual from Punjab to win the Sahitya Akademi Award for both Hindi and Sanskrit literature. While several Punjabi writers have previously received the award in other languages, Gautam holds the distinction of being the first to win it for a Sanskrit work, with his novel Vaishali.

- Shiromani Sanskrit Sahityakar Samman (2011).
- Sahitya Akademi Award (2020) for Vaishali.
- Kalidas Puraskar (2020) for Sunayana, Language Department of Punjab.
- Banhatt Puraskar (2020) for Sunayana, Uttar Pradesh Sanskrit, Lucknow.
- Giani Sant Singh Best Book Award (2014) for Swatantrya Samar.
- Sudarshan Best Book Award (2015) for Adhoora Aadami.
