= Ramji Thakur =

Indian writer

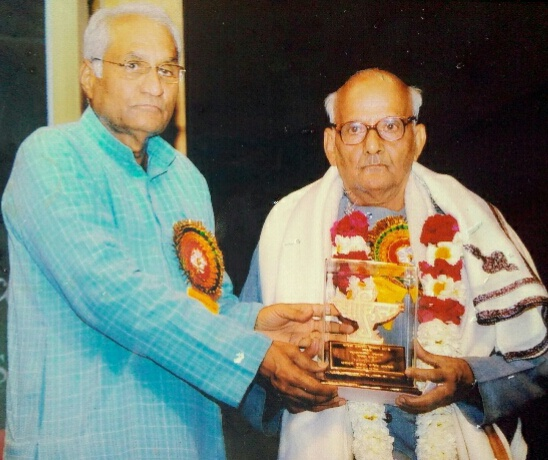
Ramji Thakur

Ramji Thakur is a Sanskrit poet. He won Sahitya Akademi Award in 2012 for his work Laghupadyahprabandhatrayi.

== Early life ==
He was born in Phulgama province of Nepal. The Vaishnavic poet Govinda Thakur and his step brother, the famous poet Ruchikar were his ancestors. His gurus included Lakhshminath Jha, V.R.Sharma and Pt.Shobhakant Jayadev Jha.

He completed his Acharya from Bihar Sanskrit Samiti, Patna 1956 with a gold medal. He earned an M.A.in 1960 from Bihar University, Muzaffarpur and Ph.D. in 1981 from Lalit Narayan Mithila University, Darbhanga with the topic: बाणभटस्य रचनासु प्र॓ક્ષIविलास.

== Career ==
He served as lecturer in Purnima Ramapratap Sanskrit college, Baigani, Darbhanga from 1964 to 1972.

He taught at Maharaj Lakshmi Singh college from 1972 to 1989.

== Personal life ==
The poet retired from the Sanskrit department of Lalit Narayan Mithila University, Darbhanga.

== Books ==
KHANDKAAVYAM:-

- Vaidehi padankam 1998
- Radha Viraham 1998
- Prem Rahasyam 2003
- Baneshwari Charitam 2004
- Govind Charitamritam 2005
- Matristanyam 2007

KAAVYAAM

- Geetimadhuri 2009

MUKTKAAVYAM

- Aryavilaasah 2009
- Laghupadyahprabandhatrayi 2010
- Kaavyakoshah 2011
- Paryay Charitam Kavyam 2015
- Amritmanthanam 2016
