= Official Languages Commission =

Indian commission on the Hindi language

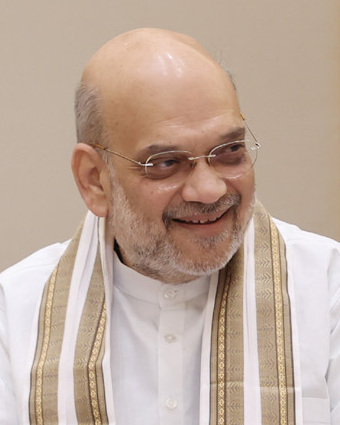
Amit Shah, Chairperson, Parliamentary Committee on Official Language

Official Languages Commission is an Indian commission which was constituted by the president of India in pursuance to the provisions stated in the Article-344 of the Indian Constitution. This commission was constituted on June 7, 1955 vide a notification of the Ministry of Home Affairs, government of India.

== Duties of the Commission ==
As defined in the Article-344 of the Constitution, it shall be the duty of the Commission to make recommendations to the President as to:

1. the progressive use of the Hindi language for the official purposes of the Union;
2. restrictions on the use of the English language for all or any of the official purposes of the Union;
3. the language to be used for all or any of the purposes mentioned in Article 348;
4. the form of numerals to be used for any one or more specified purposes of the Union;
5. any other matter referred to the Commission by the President as regards the official language of the Union and the language for communication between the Union and a State or between one State and another and their use.

== Joint parliamentary committee ==
The joint parliamentary committee examines the progress made in the use of Hindi for the official purpose of the Union.

As defined in the articles of the Constitution of India, "the committee shall consist of thirty members, of whom twenty shall be members of the House of the People and ten shall be members of the Council of States to be elected respectively by the members of the House of the People and the members of the Council of States in accordance with the system of proportional representation by means of the single transferable vote."

=== 2024 ===
In September 2024, during the 36th meeting of the committee, Union Minister Amit Shah was re-elected as the Chairperson unanimously, in continuation of his 2019 chairpersonship. During his address, Shah set the goal of using Hindi for country's entire work by the Independence Day, 2047 when the country will mark 100-years of freedom. The committee has developed a Hindi Shabdkosh in collaboration with Ministry of Education, adding thousands of new words from other local languages, enriching Hindi of wider vocabulary words. Department of Official Language is working on a software that enables translation of all languages of 8th Schedule to Hindi automatically.

== See also ==
- Languages of India
- List of Indian languages by number of native speakers
- Official Languages Act, 1963
