= 2015 Indian writers' protest =

Political protest

The 2015 Indian writers protest, also referred to as award wapsi (lit. 'award return'), against alleged government silence on violence was a wide-spread protest in India starting from the beginning of September 2015, wherein disgruntled writers and poets across India started returning highly prestigious awards, including Sahitya Akademi Award and Padma Shri, to protest the increasing incidents of communal violence in India, murder of minorities and rationalists, and alleged government silence on the matter.

== Overview ==
They believe there is a climate of rising intolerance in the country under the present central government (NDA Alliance). Many scholars have protested the growing intolerance of government supported Hindu right-wing groups against minorities particularly Dadri lynching, murders of rationalists like M. M. Kalburgi, Govind Pansare, and Narendra Dabholkar, and government silence on violence.

Sixteen Sahitya Akademi Award-winning Tamil writers, Indira Parthasarathy, K. Rajanarayanan, Ponneelan, Prapanchan, Ashokamitran, Thoppil Mohamed Meeran, S. Abdul Rahman, Vairamuthu, Tamilanban, Muhammed Metha, Melanmai Ponnusamy, Puviarasu, Nanjil Nadan, S. Venkatesan, D. Selvaraj and Poomani, have condemned the Akademi for not adequately condemning the murder of Kannada writer M. M. Kalburgi and its failure to bring pressure on the centre to protect freedom of expression. Several elite writers and poets, including Shashi Deshpande, K. Satchidanandan, Aravind Malagatti and P. K. Parakkadvu have resigned their posts in Sahitya Akademi, the General Council of the country's top literary body, claiming that they were shocked at the level of intolerance on freedom of speech and expression. including Nayantara Sahgal, Sarah Joseph, and Ashok Vajpeyi

Hindi writer Uday Prakash was the first to return the prestigious award on September 4, 2015, protesting against the murder of M. M. Kalburgi. Writer Nayantara Sahgal and poet Ashok Vajpeyi followed Prakash in protesting the murders of rationalists like M. M. Kalburgi, Govind Pansare and Narendra Dabholkar. They also came out against the Dadri incident, in which a mob lynched a Muslim man in Dadri village of Uttar Pradesh over rumours of eating and storing beef.

As of 2020, 26 writers are yet to return their souvenirs after declaring the return of awards. Only 13 writers have returned souvenirs and prize money. To prevent return of awards from taking place again, a Parliamentary committee recommended that the Centre should make recipients of government awards sign an undertaking that they would not return them at any stage as a mark of protest. Among others, as of October 2015, Ajmer Aulakh, Aman Sethi, Ganesh Devy, Kum. Veerabhadrappa and Shashi Deshpande have publicly announced their return of the Padma Shri, the fourth highest civillian award in India and 40 Sahitya academy award recipeints have returned their award. To show their condemnation Deshpande, K. Satchidanandan, PK Parakkadvu and Aravind Malagatti have also resigned their posts at the Sahitya Akademi institution.

List of writers who have returned their awards as of 15 October 2015
S.No.	Writer	Field	Award
1	Uday Prakash	Hindi writer	
2	Nayantara Sahgal	English writer	Padma Shri
3	Ashok Vajpeyi	Hindi poet	
4	Sarah Joseph	Malayalam novelist	
5	Ghulam Nabi Khayal	Kashmiri writer	
6	Rahman Abbas	Urdu novelist	
7	Waryam Sandhu	Punjabi writer	
8	Gurbachan Singh Bhullar	Punjabi writer	
9	Ajmer Singh Aulakh	Punjabi writer	
10	Atamjit Singh	Punjabi writer	
11	G. N. Ranganatha Rao	Kannada translator	
12	Manglesh Dabral	Hindi writer	
13	Rajesh Joshi	Hindi writer	
14	G. N. Devy	Gujarati writer	
15	D. N. Srinath	Kannada translator	
16	Kumbar Veerabhadrappa	Kannada novelist	
17	Rahamat Tarikere	Kannada writer	
18	Baldev Singh Sadaknama	Punjabi novelist	
19	Jaswinder	Punjabi poet	
20	Darshan Buttar	Punjabi poet	
21	Surjit Patar	Punjabi poet	
22	Chaman Lal	Punjabi translator	
23	Homen Borgohain	Assamese journalist	
24	Mandakranta Sen	Bengali poet	
25	Keki N. Daruwalla	English poet	
26	Nand Bhardwaj	Rajasthani writer	
27	Veeranna Madiwalar	Kannada writer	Sahitya Parishat
28	T. Satish Javare Gowda	Kannada writer	Sahitya Parishat
29	Sangamesh Menasinakai	Kannada writer	Sahitya Parishat
30	Hanumanth Haligeri	Kannada writer	Sahitya Parishat
31	Sridevi V. Aloor	Kannada writer	Sahitya Parishat
32	Chidananda Sali	Kannada writer	Sahitya Parishat
33	Maya Krishna Rao	Theater artist	
3434	Megh Raj Mitter	Punjabi writer	
35	Dalip Kaur Tiwana	Punjabi writer	Padma Shri

=== Statements made by writers ===
The situation has come to such pass that there was no security for the life of a writer not to mention the threat to freedom of expression. The Akademi has not condemned the act in no uncertain terms. On the contrary it has just issued a general statement. It is not adequate and we demand that the Akademi take a stronger stand.

— Tamil writers

The PM keeps quiet. Writers are being murdered, Innocents being killed and his ministers making objectionable statements

— Ashok vajpeyi

The country is now passing through very though times. It's worse than Emergency

— Sarah Joseph

We are going backwards. There is rising intolerance

— Nayantara Sahgal

== Reactions ==
Former Sahitya Akademi president Vishwanath Prasad Tiwari has claimed that he has evidence to prove that the “award wapsi” movement in 2015, when more than 50 writers returned their awards to protest alleged growth in intolerance under the Narendra Modi governance, were part of a politically motivated campaign organised by Marxist writers and Hindi poet Ashok Vajpeyi to defame the government in the run-up to the 2015 Bihar Legislative Assembly election. Union Minister and former Chief of Army Staff General V. K. Singh claimed that the return of awards by the writers citing intolerance was a planned conspiracy. The then Union Minister Maneka Gandhi said that the return of awards was an international conspiracy against the Modi Government. The prime minister Narendra Modi has been accused of using whataboutism, especially in regard to the 2015 Indian writers protest and the nomination of former Chief Justice Ranjan Gogoi to parliament.

== See also ==
- Freedom of expression in India
- Premiership of Narendra Modi
- Freedom of the press in India
- Conservatism in India
- Religious violence in India
- Hindutva terrorism
