= List of Sahitya Akademi Award winners for Punjabi =

List of winners of a literary honor in India

Sahitya Akademi Award for Punjabi
- Award for contributions to Punjabi literature
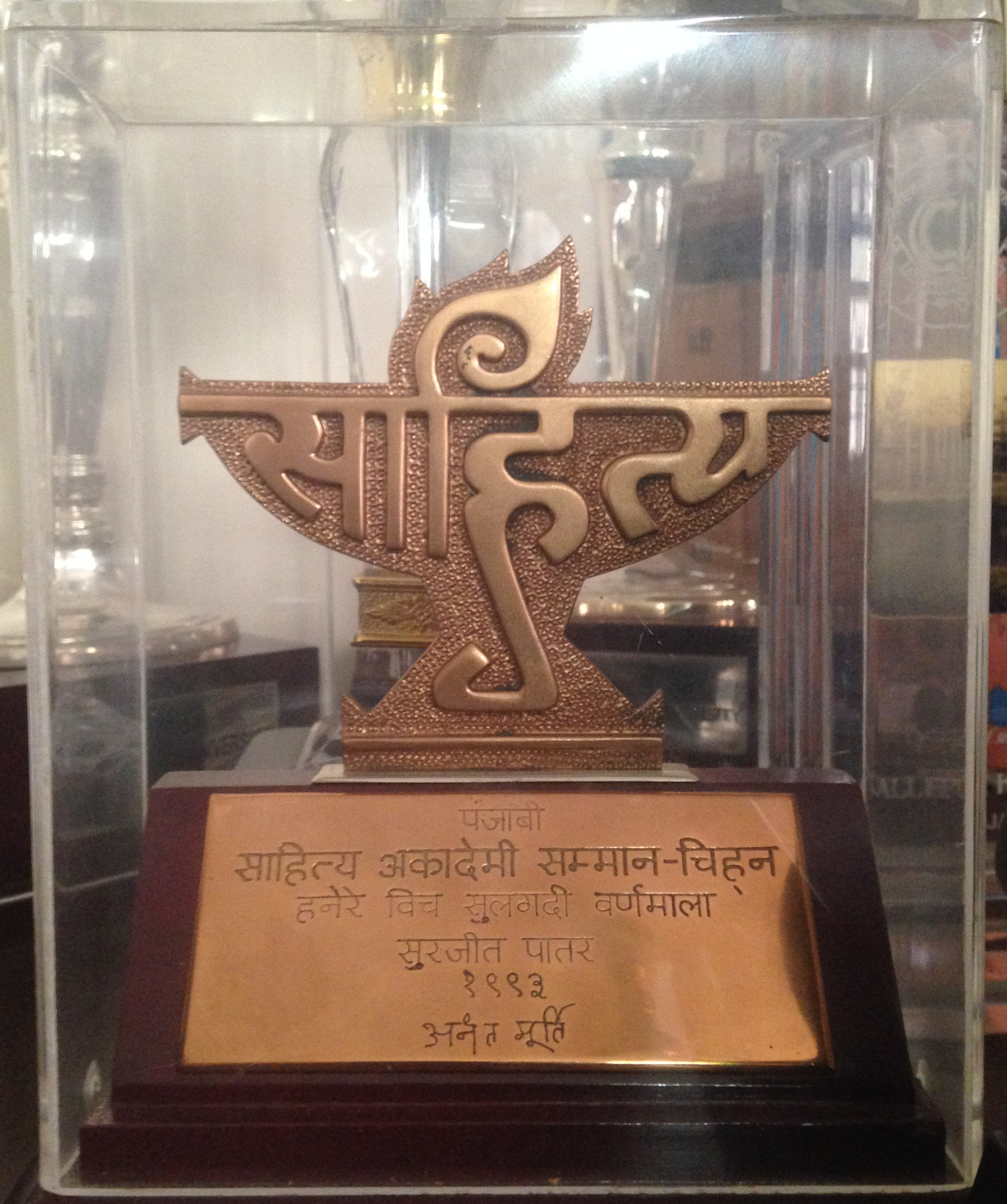
- Awarded for: Literary award in India
- Sponsored by: Sahitya Akademi, Government of India
- Reward: ₹1 lakh (US$1,100)
- First award: 1955
- Final award: 2024

Highlights
- Total awarded: 64
- First winner: Bhai Vir Singh
- Most Recent winner: Paul Kaur
- Website: Official website

Part of a series on

Sahitya Akademi Awards
Category
Sahitya Akademi Award winners by language
- Assamese
- Bengali
- Bodo
- Dogri
- English
- Gujarati
- Hindi
- Kannada
- Kashmiri
- Konkani
- Maithili
- Malayalam
- Marathi
- Meitei (Manipuri)
- Nepali
- Odia
- Punjabi
- Rajasthani
- Sanskrit
- Santali
- Sindhi
- Tamil
- Telugu
- Urdu
Sahitya Akademi Translation Prizes
- Assamese
- Bengali
- Bodo
- Dogri
- English
- Gujarati
- Hindi
- Kannada
- Kashmiri
- Konkani
- Maithili
- Malayalam
- Marathi
- Meitei (Manipuri)
- Nepali
- Odia
- Punjabi
- Rajasthani
- Sanskrit
- Santali
- Sindhi
- Tamil
- Telugu
- Urdu
Sahitya Akademi Yuva Puraskar
- Assamese
- Bengali
- Bodo
- Dogri
- English
- Gujarati
- Hindi
- Kannada
- Kashmiri
- Konkani
- Maithili
- Malayalam
- Meitei (Manipuri)
- Marathi
- Nepali
- Odia
- Punjabi
- Rajasthani
- Sanskrit
- Santali
- Sindhi
- Tamil
- Telugu
- Urdu
Sahitya Akademi Bal Sahitya Puraskar
- Assamese
- Bengali
- Bodo
- Dogri
- English
- Gujarati
- Hindi
- Kannada
- Kashmiri
- Konkani
- Maithili
- Malayalam
- Meitei (Manipuri)
- Marathi
- Nepali
- Odia
- Punjabi
- Rajasthani
- Sanskrit
- Santali
- Sindhi
- Tamil
- Telugu
- Urdu
Related
- Eighth Schedule to the Constitution of India
- Official Languages Commission
- List of languages by number of native speakers in India

Sahitya Akademi Award is given each year, since 1955, by the Sahitya Akademi, India's National Academy of Letters, to writers and their works, for outstanding contribution to Indian literature and Punjabi literature in particular. it as well as for translations. This is the second highest literary award of India, after Jnanpith Award. No awards were given in years, 1957, 1958, 1960, 1966.

== Recipients ==
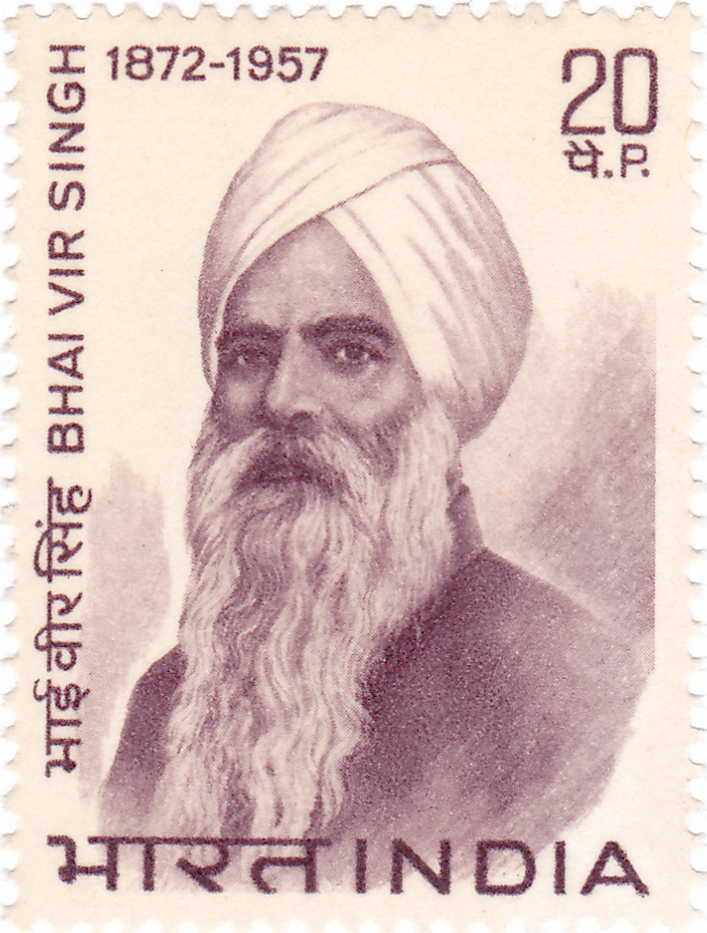
Bhai Vir Singh was the first winner of this award.

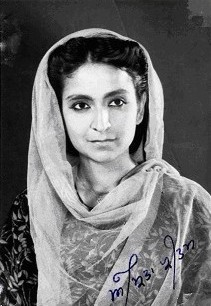
Amrita Pritam was the first woman winner of this award.

Year	Author	Work	Type of Work
1955	Bhai Vir Singh	Mere Sainya Jio	Poetry
1956	Amrita Pritam	Sunehade	Poetry
1959	Mohan Singh	Wadda Vela	Poetry
1961	Nanak Singh	Ik Miyan Do Talwaran	Novel
1962	Balwant Gargi	Rangmanch	History and development of Indian Theatre
1964	Prabhjot Kaur	Pabbi	Poetry
1965	Kartar Singh Duggal	Ik Chhit Chanan Di	Short Stories
1967	Shiv Kumar Batalvi	Loona	Verse-Play
1968	Kulwant Singh Virk	Naven Lok	Short Stories
1969	Harbhajan Singh	Na Dhuppe Na Chaanve	Poetry
1971	Dalip Kaur Tiwana	Eho Hamara Jiwana	Novel
1972	Sant Singh Sekhon	Mittar Pyara	Play
1973	Dr. Harcharan Singh	Kal, Aj Te Bhalke	Play
1974	Sohan Singh Seetal	Jug Badal Gaya	Novel
1975	Gurdial Singh	Adh Chanani Raat	Novel
1976	Narenderpal Singh	Ba Mulahaza Hoshiar	Novel
1977	Sohan Singh Misha	Kach De Vastar	Poetry
1978	Gurmukh Singh Musafir	Urvar Par	Short Stories
1979	Jaswant Singh Neki	Karuna Di Chho Ton Magron	Poetry
1980	Sukhpal Vir Singh Hasrat	Suraj Te Kehkashan	Poetry
1981	V.N.Tiwari	Garaj Ton Footpath Teek	Poetry
1982	Gulzar Singh Sandhu	Amar Katha	Short Stories
1983	Pritam Singh Safir	Anik Bishthar	Poetry
1984	Kapur Singh Ghuman	Pagal Lok	Play
1985	Ajeet Cour	Khana Badosh	Autobiography
1986	Sujan Singh	Shahar Te Gran	Short Stories
1987	Ram Sarup Ankhi	Kothe Kharak Singh	Novel
1988	Sohinder Singh Wanjara Bedi	Galiey Chikar Duri Ghar	Autobiography
1989	Tara Singh Kamil	Kahikashan	Poetry
1990	Manjit Tiwana	Uninda Wartman	Poetry
1991	Harinder Singh Mehboob	Jhanan Di Rat	Poetry
1992	Prem Parkash	Kujh Ankeha Vi	Short Stories
1993	Surjit Patar	Haneray Vich Sulgadi Varnmala	Poetry
1994	Mohinder Singh Sarna	Nawen Yug De Waris	Short Stories
1995	Jagtar	Jugnoo Deeva Te Darya	Poetry
1996	Santokh Singh Dhir	Pakhi	Short Stories
1997	Jaswant Singh Kanwal	Taushali Di Hanso	Novel
1998	Mahan Bhandari	Moon Di Akh	Short Stories
1999	Niranjan Singh Tasneem	Gawache Arth	Novel
2000	Waryam Singh Sandhu	Chauthi Koot	Short Stories
2001	Dev	Shabdant	Poetry
2002	Harbhajan Singh Halwarvi	Pulaan Ton Paar	Poems
2003	Charan Dass Sidhu	Bhagat Singh Shahid : Natak Tikri	Play
2004	Sutinder Singh Noor	Kavita Di Bhumika	Criticism
2005	Gurbachan Singh Bhullar	Agni-Kalas	Short Stories
2006	Ajmer Singh Aulakh	Ishk Baj Namaz Da Haz Nahi	Plays
2007	Jaswant Deed	Kamandal	Poetry
2008	Mitter Sain Meet	Sudhar Ghar	Novel
2009	Atamjit Singh	Tatti Tavi Da Sach	Play
2010	Vanita	Kaal Pehar Gharian	Poetry
2011	Baldev Singh	Dhaawaan Dilli De Kingrey	Novel
2012	Darshan Buttar	Maha Kambani	Poetry
2013	Manmohan	Nirvaan	Novel
2014	Jaswinder	Agarbatti	Poetry
2015	Dr. Jaswinder Singh	Maat Lok	Novel
2016	Dr. Swarajbir Singh	Maseya Di Raat	Play
2017	Nachhattar	Slow down	Novel
2018	Dr. Mohanjit	Kone Da Sooraj	Poetry
2019	Kirpal Kazak	Antheen	Short Stories
2020	Gurdev Singh Rupana	Aam Khass	Short Stories
2021	Khalid Hussain	Sullan da Salan	Short Stories
2022	Sukhjit	Main Aynghosh Nahi	Short Stories
2023	Swarnjit Savi	Mann Di Chip	Poetry
2024	Paul Kaur	Sun Gunvanta Sun Budhivanta: Itihaasnama Punjab	Poetry
2025	Jinder	Safety Kit	Short Story
