= Swarajbir Singh =

Indian Punjabi playwright, poet, and editor

Swarajbir
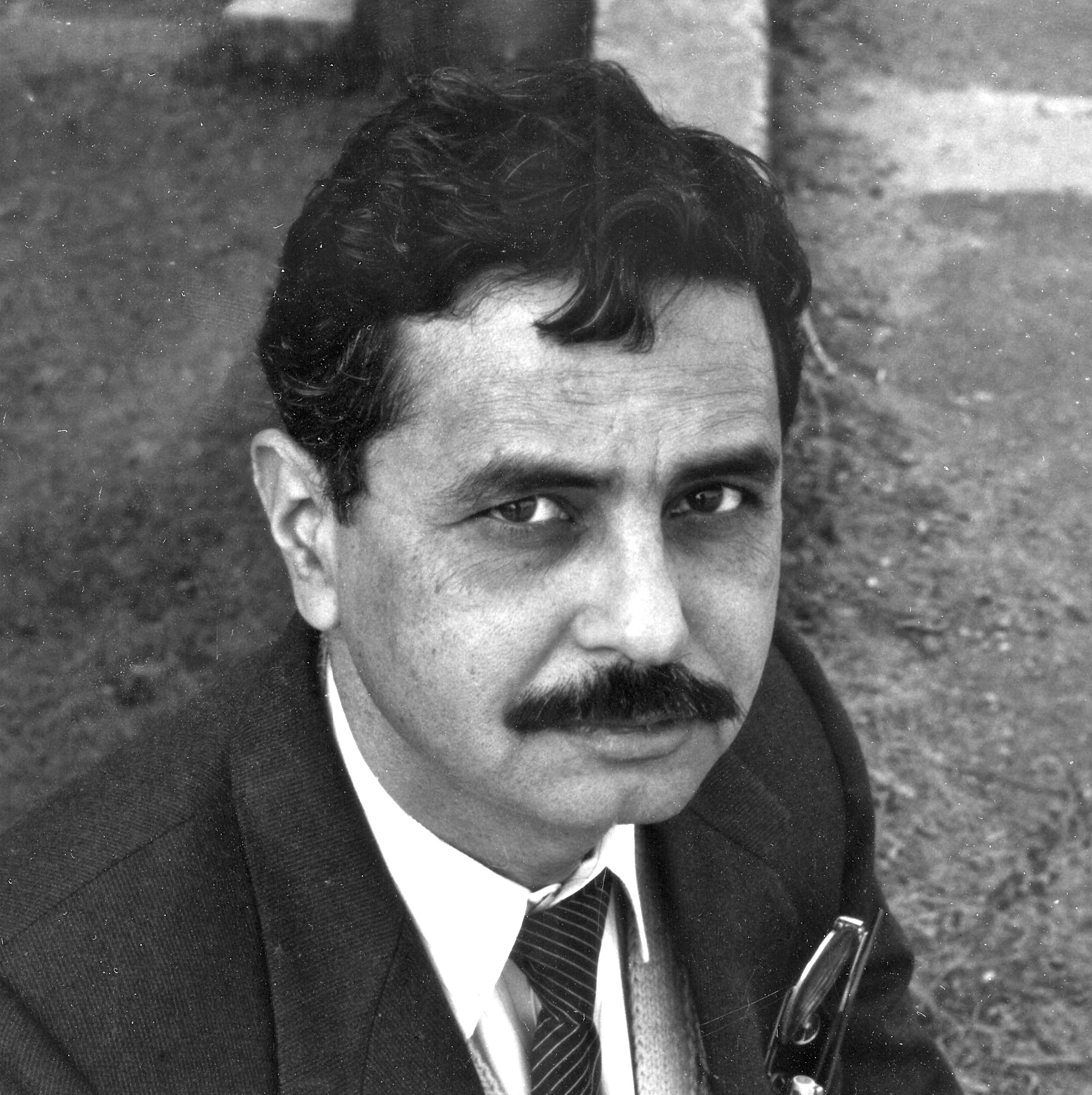
- Swarajbir in 1998, Photo by Amarjit Chandan
- Born: Swarajbir Singh; 22 April 1958 (age 68); Verka, Punjab, India
- Education: MBBS
- Occupations: Playwright, Poet, Journalist, Administrator
- Years active: 1980s to present
- Employer(s): The Tribune Trust (editor); Indian Police Service (Director General of Police); Central Industrial Security Force (Inspector General). Punjab Civil Medical Services (Doctor)
- Notable work: Dharam Guru (1999), Krishna (2000), Medni (2002), Shairi (2004), and Masia di Rāt (2013)
- Spouse: Arvinder Kaur (Wife)
- Children: Manraj Singh (Son)

Swarajbir Singh (born 24 April 1958) is an Indian Punjabi playwright, poet, administrator, and editor. He received the Sahitya Akademi Award for his play Masia di Rāt (2016)

He was the editor of the daily newspaper Punjabi Tribune from 31 August 2018 to 13 January 2024. He is also a nominated member of Punjabi University's Senate. He served as a Medical doctor in a rural government dispensary in Gurdaspur district during 1983–1984. He entered civil services in India Defence Accounts in 1984. He joined the Indian Police Service in 1986. He was allotted Assam-Meghalaya Cadre and retired as Director General of Police Meghalaya, Shillong in July 2018.

== Early life ==
Swarajbir was born in the village of Verka, district of Amritsar, Punjab, India. His native village is Dharmabad but he grew up in villages Nawan Pind Mallowali and Ghuman in Gurdaspur district. He studied medicine at the Government Medical College, Amritsar.

== Writing career ==
Swarajbir is a prolific playwright. His plays have been staged all over India and have won several awards. Swarajbir began writing poetry in the early 1980s. His first collection of poems, Apni Apni Rāt (1985), was awarded the Prof. Mohan Singh Puraskar by Guru Nanak Dev University. He contributed writing to the Punjabi literary magazines Preet Lari, Aks and Wahga.

His work has been praised for its strong social and political commentary. His plays often deal with themes of oppression, injustice, and the struggle for freedom. Critic Pankaj K Singh remarks, "Swarajbir's social commitment and humanistic vision make him repeatedly build an interrogative discourse, questioning the unjust ideologies and practices of the dominant classes and clans in myths, history or contemporary reality and raising the voice of the oppressed." In the opinion of contemporary playwright Atamjit Singh, "Swarajbir is known for in-depth study of his material and dramatic action that is largely based either on history or mythology; he invariably addresses the contemporary society.”

Swarajbir's plays based on history and contemporary issues have attracted the attention of historians as well. Historian Anshu Malhotra who has analysed Swarajbir's play 'Shiary (Poetry)' along with Shahryar's ‘Piro Preman’ and Vijender Das's ‘Sant Kaviyitri Ma Piro’ writes in the context of that play, “Swarajbir puts his heroine in the feminist mold, even while indicating that feminism may be a ruse to categorise women who don't fit into culturally sanctioned roles” Historian Raj Kumar Hans has analysed his unpublished but staged play ‘Kachi Garhi’ in the historical context; according to Hans, “Swarajbir consciously searches for the counter currents which have been marginalized from established historiography.” Historian Bhagwan Josh has evaluated his play Tasweeran in the historical situation of Punjabi women. His poetry is known for its lyrical beauty and its exploration of the human condition.

Swarajbir is a major figure in Punjabi literature. He is a recipient of numerous awards and honors, and his work has been translated into several languages.

== Works ==
Here is the list of works by Swarajbir Singh

=== Published plays ===
- Dharama Guru (1999)
- Krishna (2000)
- Medni (The Earth) (2002)
- Shiari (Poetry) (2004)
- Kallar (The Alkaline Earth (2006)
- Masia Di Rāt (Moonless Night)(2013)
- Tasveeran (Pictures) (2014, published the anthology Nat-Sarvar edited by Kewal Dhaliwal) (2017 published independently)
- Haq (The Rights) (2015)
- Agni Kund(The Fire Put) (2016)

=== Unpublished plays ===
- Jan da Meet (A Representative of the People)
- Pul-Sirāt (Mythological bridge over hell while crossing over to Heaven on the Day of Judgment)
- Kachi Garhi (The Mud-Fortress)
- Fasal (The Harvest)
- Eh Gallan Kade Phir Karange (We will talk about these things sometimes later) ( Nine monologues)
- Ahilaya
- Mahadand (The Great Punishment)

=== Essays ===
- Teri Dharti Tere Lok (Your Earth Your People), Monthly Column against the terrorism of the 1980s published in Punjabi Magazine Preet Lari in 1988–89.

=== Poetry ===
- Apni Apni Rāt (Everybody's own night) (1985)
- Sahan Thani (Through our Breath) (1989)
- 23 March (1993), (Poems in memory of Pash)

== Awards and nominations ==
Here is the list of awards and nominations

Year	Award	Institute	Work	Notes
1986	Prof Mohan Singh Puraskar	Guru Nanak Dev University	Apni Apni Rāt	
1995	Kavita Puraskar	Punjabi Academy, Delhi	23 March	
2000	Natak Puraskar	Punjabi Academy, Delhi	Dharam Guru	
2001	Ambedkar Puraskar	Manavwadi Manch, Jallandhar	Literature	
2002	Sukhdev Preet Yadgari Puraskar	Manch-Rangmanch	Literature	
2002	PULS Manch Puraskar	PULS Manch	Literature	PULS Manch headed by Gursharn Singh
2005	Kalam Puraskar		Literature	
2010	Param Sahit Seva Puraskar	Punjabi Academy, Delhi	Literature	for overall contribution to Punjabi literature.
2013	Dr. Jagtar Yadgari Puraskar		Literature	An award in the memory of Punjabi poet Jagtar, for Swarajbir's contribution to Punjabi poetry and drama
2015	Virsa Vihar Puraskar	Virsa Vihar of Amritsar	Literature	For overall contribution to Punjabi theatre 2015
2015	Sahitarth Puraskar	Shabad-Lok Organization	Literature	Given in honour of late Punjabi litterateur Shri Sant Singh Sekhon for Swarajbir's overall contribution to Punjabi Literature
2016	Sahitya Akademi Award	Sahitya Akademi	Masia di Rāt	Main article: List of Sahitya Akademi Award winners for Punjabi
2018	Punjabi Sahit Sabha Delhi Puraskar	Punjabi Sahit Sabha Delhi	Literature	Along with Amarjit Chandan and Jang Bahadur Goyal
