= Swarnjit Savi =

Punjabi poet

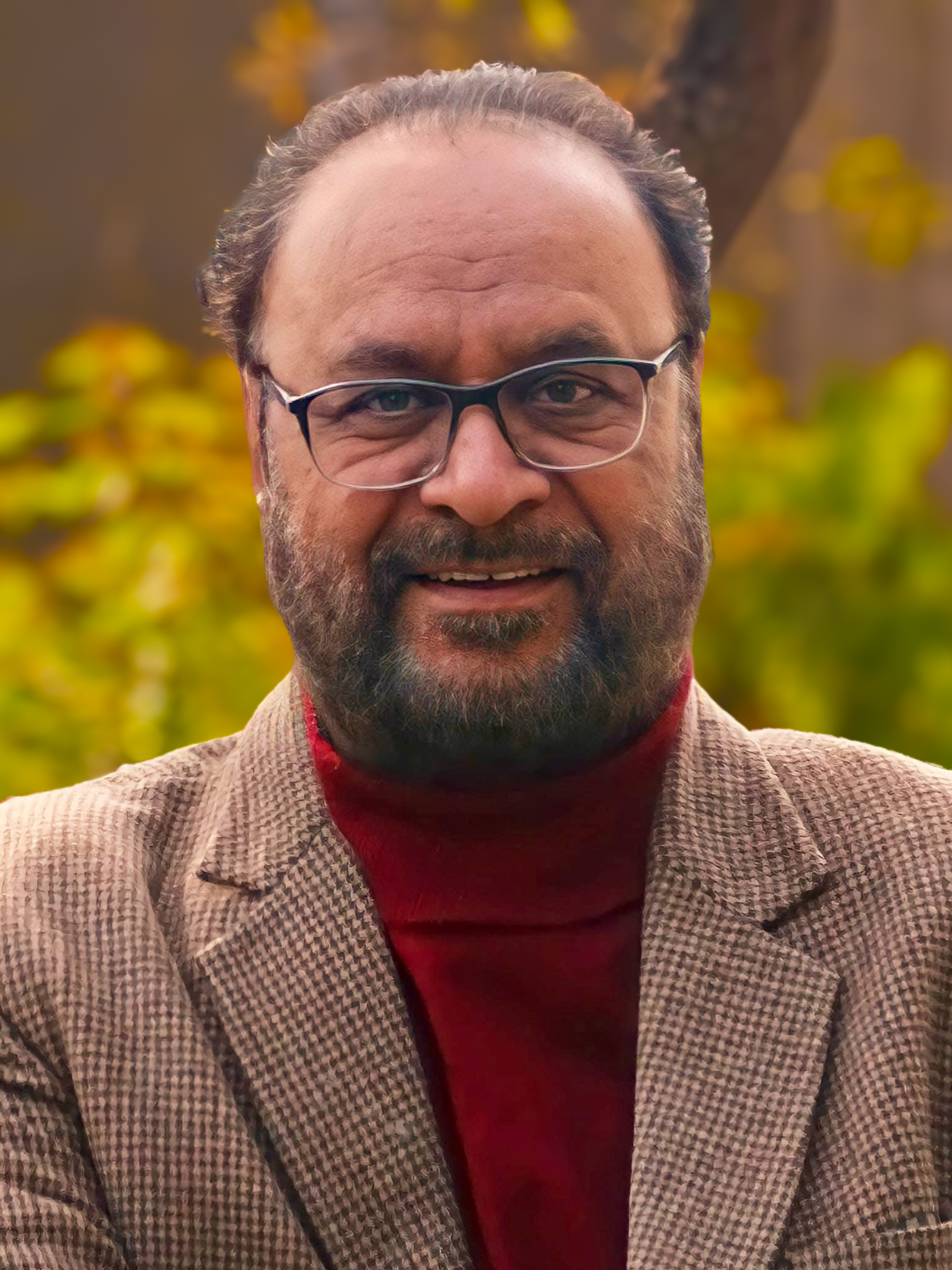
- Swarnjit Savi in 2025
- Born: 1958 (age 66–67)
- Known for: Mann Di Chip
- Awards: Sahitya Akademi Award

Swarnjit Savi (born 1958) is a Punjabi writer and painter. He won the Sahitya Akademi Award in 2023 for his poetry collection Mann Di Chip.

== Biography ==
Savi has a postgraduate degree in English and Fine Arts.

== Works ==
- Dehi Nada (1994)
- Kameshwari (1999)

== Awards ==
- Sahitya Akademi Award in 2023 for Mann Di Chip
