= Satguru Ram Singh =

Namdhari Sikh spiritual leader (1816–1885)

Satguru Ram Singh Ji
- Painting of Baba Ram Singh Kuka, Sikh style, Punjab Plains, c. 1845–50

Guru of the Namdharis
- In office 1841 – 17 January 1872
- Preceded by: Guru Balak Singh
- Succeeded by: Guru Hari Singh
- Title: Twelfth Guru of the Namdhari Sikhs

Personal life
- Born: Ram Singh Tarkhan; 3 February 1816 Raiyan village (Sri Bhaini Sahib), Punjab
- Died: 29 November 1885; this information is contested by Namdhari Sikhs Mergui, Burma (now Myeik, Myanmar)
- Spouse: Mata Jassan
- Children: Bibi Daya Kaur; Bibi Nand Kaur
- Parents: Baba Jassa Singh (father); Mata Sada Kaur (mother)

Religious life
- Religion: Sikhism
- Sect: Namdhari

Religious career
- Based in: Sri Bhaini Sahib

Namdhari Guru Ram Singh (3 February 1816 – 1885 (Note: Followers of the Namdhari sect contest that he died in 1885 and believe he is still alive as per their beliefs.)) is known to the Namdhari sect of Sikhism as the twelfth guru (religious leader), whilst for mainstream Sikhs such as Damdami Taksal and Nihangs, he is regarded as a 'Saint' and not a Guru. He is credited as being the first Indian to use non-cooperation and boycott of British goods and services as a political tool. He was exiled to Rangoon, Burma (Myanmar) by the British colonial government of India on 18 January 1872. In 2016, the Government of India officially decided to commemorate the 200th anniversary of Satguru Ram Singh. The Punjab Government organizes state-level functions on his birth anniversary and has declares a holiday on this occasion. His portrait is displayed at the Indian Parliament and at the Railway Station, Ludhiana.

== Biography ==
=== Early life ===
Namdhari Guru Ram Singh was born in a small-farming Tarkhan family to mother Sada Kaur and father Jassa Singh. He lived in the village of Raiyan, near Sri Bhaini Sahib, Ludhiana. He was nurtured by his mother in the traditions of Guru Nanak and was taught to read and write in Punjabi. Namdhari Guru Ram Singh spent 20 years of his life attending to the family business.

=== Service in the military of the Sikh Empire ===
Later, his father sent him to the army of the Sikh Empire at age 20. As the empire fell apart after the death of Maharaja Ranjit Singh, concerns over British power and Sikh decline led him to galvanize his followers (of mostly humble origin) to proclaim a new "Sant Khalsa" to restore Sikh prestige.

=== Meeting with Guru Balak Singh ===
Namdhari Guru Ram Singh was a member of a unit of Prince Naunihal Singh's platoon, the Baghel Regiment. His regiment was sent to Peshawar to bring the royal coffers. On its way back, the unit rested at Hazro Fort, now in Pakistan. It is said that Namdhari Guru Ram Singh and some soldiers of his regiment went to meet Guru Balak Singh of the Namdharis. Guru Balak Singh was overjoyed to see Ram Singh and according to folklore told him: "I had been waiting for you." He told Guru Ram Singh that he was the next in line to him.

Guru Ram Singh became a disciple of Guru Balak Singh. Guru Balak Singh gave him "Patasha" (sugar bubbles), a coconut, five paise coins and took five rounds around him in reverence and bowed before him, making him his successor. Guru Balak Singh appointed Guru Ram Singh as his successor before his death.

=== Sant Khalsa (Saint Khalsa) ===
The reign of Maharaja Ranjit Singh brought the much needed law and order in the North-Western region of India. The region flourished along many dimensions. However, the luxury of empire also led to moral degeneration. The majority of Sikhs had taken to drinking, consumption of opium and poppy and other vices.

Guru Ram Singh was wary of the political, cultural, and spiritual decline of the Sikhs and worried about the growing influence of the British on the horizon and what it meant for the community. Therefore, Guru Ram Singh attempted to reform the Sikhs to meet these challenges.

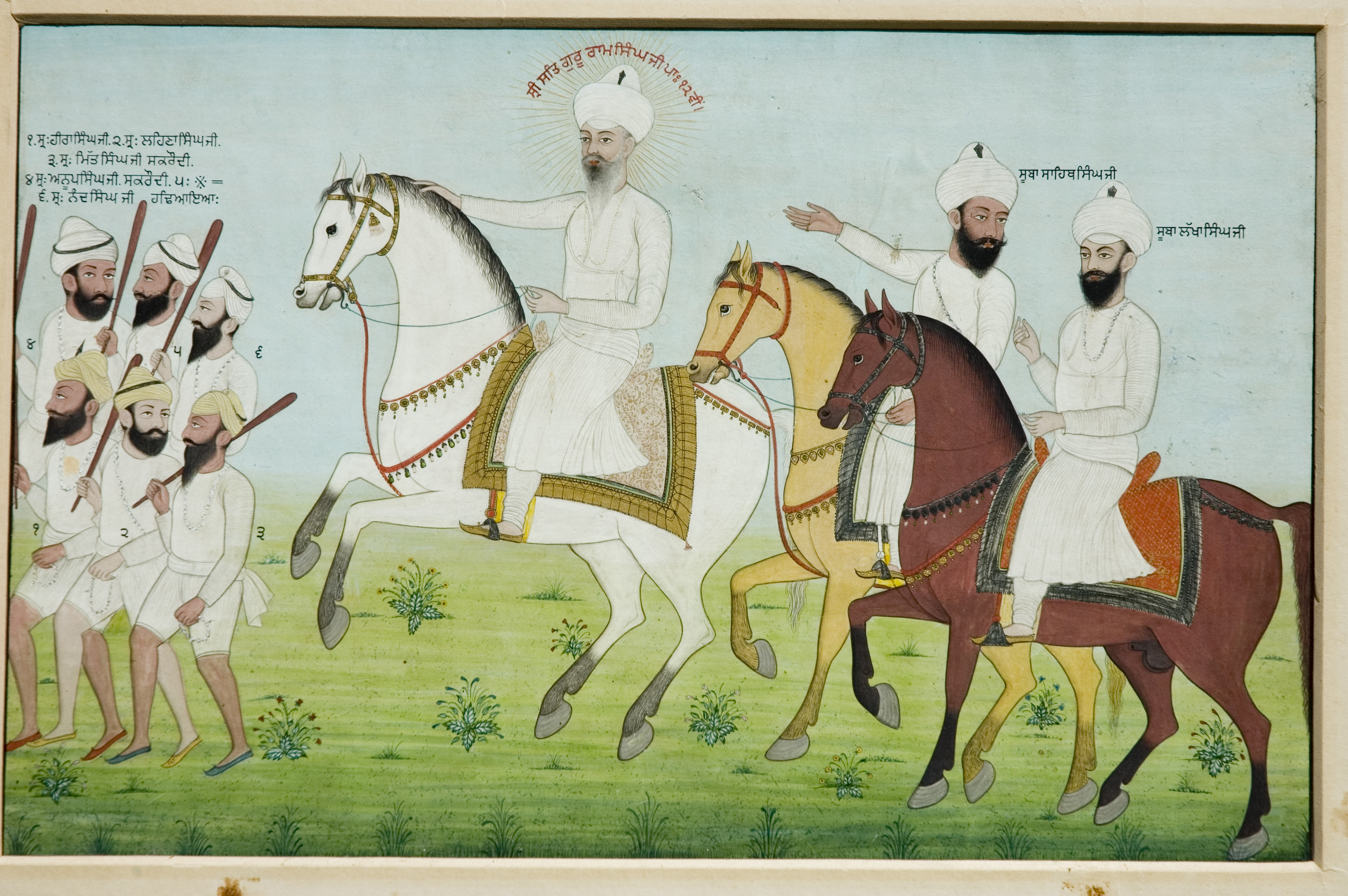
Equestrian painting of Guru Ram Singh with his retinue (including his six appointed governors known as subas)

Namdhari Guru Ram Singh administered Khande di Pahul (Amrit Sanchar) to 5 Sikhs: Kahn Singh Nihang of village Chak, Labh Singh Ragi of Amritsar, Atma Singh of Alo Muhar village, Bhai Naina Singh Wariyah, and Sudh Singh of village Durgapur. Afterwards, several people from the congregation took amrit. It is noted within the British Archives as well as Giani Gian Singh's Panth Parkash that within 10 years Satguru Ram Singh baptized a large number of people with amrit. Namdhari Sikhs were also referred to as Kukas, a name given by the public due to spiritually ecstatic behavior of the members of the sect at religious functions. Sardar Kapur Singh remarked, 'Undoubtedly, Baba Ram Singh preached the same path and principles which had been told to Indians by Guru Nanak, Guru Gobind Singh and the ten Gurus.'

=== Socio-religious reforms ===
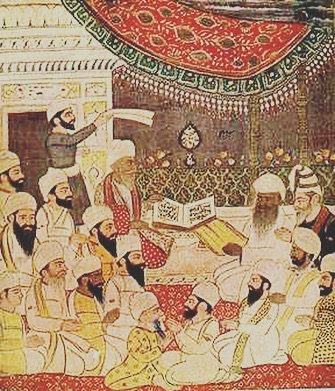
Painting of a Namdhari or Kuka congregation of Guru Ram Singh performing katha (Sikh religious discourse lecture) with an opened scripture of Guru Granth Sahib

Theologically, the origin of Namdhari movement is located in the Sikh tradition of Nam-simran (mediation on the name of God). All vices like drinking, consumption of intoxicants and meat were strongly abhorred. His predecessor, Guru Balak Singh, had merely stressed upon the importance of chanting God's name as the only righteous religious ritual. Guru Ram Singh however would introduce many new elements into the orthodoxy and orthopraxy of the sect.

Namdhari Guru Ram Singh made it a convention to read the Sikh scriptures, Sri Aadi Guru Granth Sahib (Guru Granth Sahib) and Sri Dasam Guru Granth Sahib (Dasam Granth) daily. He directed all the holy Scriptures to be taken out of almirahs (wardrobe, cabinet, or cupboard) and placed with respect in places of worship, and that they be read regularly. He had forbidden the worship of tombs and the dead.

Guru Ram Singh's religious ideals were influenced by his predecessor, however his socio-political, martial reforms and ideology was influenced by Bhai Maharaj Singh.

The sect under his direction has been described as more puritanical and fundamentalist in-comparison to other Sikh sects of the day. They visually stood-out compared to other Sikhs, as they wore only handwoven white robes, wore distinctively-styled turbans, carried wooden staves and wool rosaries, and they used unique greetings and passwords only familiar to fellow members of their sect. Their gurdwaras (places of worship) were very simple and this was by design rather than circumstance.

Furthermore, Namdhari Guru Ram Singh introduced a distinctive method of reciting and performing singing of gurbani in kirtan performances in-which members of the congregation would shriek near the end in ecstasy. This earned the sect the alternative name of kuka, from the kuk shrieks they would make.

Guru Ram Singh taught that the Namdhari sect was the "clean" one due to its devotion to God, and those who killed animals and consumed liquor were mleccha ("unclean").

In 1863, the colonial authorities perceived the visit of Guru Ram Singh in Amritsar as an attempt to declare himself as the reincarnation of Guru Gobind Singh, but a crackdown by the colonial police prevented him from doing so. He had planned to establish a new "Kuka Khalsa" after the declaration. After the police crackdown, Guru Ram Singh had been restricted to only his native village for an indefinite period of time by the colonial authorities.

=== Women empowerment ===
A revolutionary step taken by Namdhari Guru Ram Singh was to administer amrit to women. The ill practices of child marriage, female infanticide, swapping of wives and sale of girls, prevalent in the then Punjab, were vehemently opposed by Namdhari Guru Ram Singh. British officials had noted that trafficking in women was a lucrative 'money making scheme' in Punjab during those times. Namdhari Guru Ram Singh drastically reduced the cost of marriage and introduced simplicity in the ceremony. He organized simple marriages through the Gurmat ritual of anand karaj for the first time in village Khote in 1863. The priestly class got worried on the introduction of this simple ritual and fearing loss of income, reported to the imperial British authorities. Thereafter, Namdhari Guru Ram Singh was placed under house arrest for some time.

One woman was appointed a Suba by Satguru Ram Singh. She had been influential in propagating the message of Sikhi among people. Recognising her contributions, the President of India Giani Zail Singh led initiative and name a doorway Gate No. 37 of the Indian Parliament as 'Hukmi Mai Marg'.

=== Contributions to the Indian independence movement ===
Guru Ram Singh aimed to restore Sikh-rule over the region and needed to oust the British in-order to do so.

One aim of Namdhari Guru Ram Singh was to orient the strength of people towards freedom and the first step to undertake this task, was to introduce reform of their character and prevent the downfall of the Sikhs everywhere. Namdhari movement also endeavored to establish contacts with foreign countries towards the aim of Indian Independence. Namdhari Sikhs made contacts with Kashmir, Nepal and Russia. The Namdhari movement was religious, social and political since the beginning. The religious and social work was carried out in the open, while political agenda was carried on covertly.

Ram Singh established a secret, private postal service composed of trusted couriers as they did not trust the British-established postal system out of fear that intel would leak to their colonial enemies.

Namdhari Sikhs were against the imperial British policy of cultural intervention. The British imperialists had supported anti-social elements to wedge a divide among Punjabis by encouraging cow slaughter, a practice that was completely banned in the Sikh empire of Maharaja Ranjit Singh.

=== Perceived sacrilege of the Golden Temple complex ===
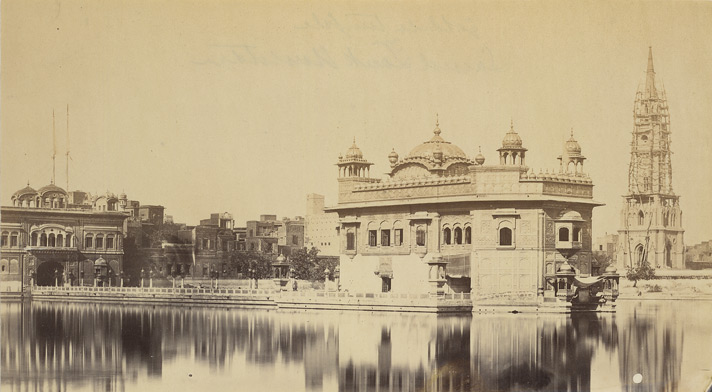
Photograph of the Golden Temple at Amritsar by an unknown photographer in the 1860s, showing the Gothic-style clock-tower under construction, from the Crofton Collection.

Similarly, other changes were brought, one of which was construction of a tall, Gothic cathedral style Clock Tower in the vicinity of Golden Temple, the sacred place of Sikhs. The management of Golden Temple was practically entirely in the hands of the imperial Government and there was no care among the priestly class for Sikh sentiments. The Clock Tower, whose construction started in 1864, was built by demolishing the structures Bunga of Kanwar Naunihal Singh and the Attari of Rani Sada Kaur, which were very dear to the Sikhs.

Sirdar Kapur Singh, Sikh scholar and the author of the Anandpur Sahib Resolution, mentioned the conditions of Amritsar, specifically Golden Temple, when the Namdhari Sikhs prepared to confront the colonially-sponsored anti-social elements. He remarks, '...the (imperial) Britishers made public kine-killing lawful and general in the annexed Punjab and gratuitously and devilishly established a public kine-slaughter house adjoining to the precincts of the Golden Temple which also they had annexed.'

=== Conflict with butchers and subsequent punishment by the colonial British government ===
The social harmony of the region was largely under threat due to the issue of cow slaughter. In the late nineteenth century, the support of colonial administration to kine-killing had become publicly evident, and was reported in a number of newspapers like Aftab-i-Punjab (Lahore), Wasir-ul-Mulk (Sialkot), Koh-i-Nur (Lahore), which explicitly stated that "kine-killing was done by the orders of the authorities who 'desired that disharmony should prevail' between Hindus and Muslims." Way back in 1862, the Maharaja of Patiala had petitioned for introduction of a bill to ban the sale of beef in India, while acting as a member of the Viceroy's Legislative Council. However, this proposal was rejected by the council.

By this time, as Namdharis were the only ones who were actively propagating against the British and were under strict British surveillance, the imperial Government was keen on false propaganda against them using temple functionaries. The British authorities were keeping an eye on the supposed prophesies of the British being vanquished by Ram Singh and as the time was passing by, they reported that an urgency of an action was vouched by certain members of the sect. The sect targeted the butchers in Amritsar, who were being supported by the imperial Government.

In January 1872, an argument took place between a Muslim butcher and a Sikh, Gurmukh Singh Namdhari at Muslim-dominated Punjabi locality and princely state Malerkotla. The argument was over the harsh treatment being meted out to the ox by his owner. The Muslim judge who tried the case ordered the ox to be slaughtered in presence of Gurmukh Singh to hurt his sentiments. This provoked a group of Namdharis, who descended upon Malerkotla, where they attacked the local butchers. The police managed to subdue the turmoil and arrested many Namdharis as instigators of the civil conflict. The British were extremely worried about the potential of a possible uprising and treated this case as one, thus they decided to enact a barbaric punishment on the accused. The prisoners were "bound over the mouths of cannons and blown to bits." The Namdharis contest this information, stating that the Kuka prisoners faced cannon shots from the front.

=== Contact established with Russians ===
After homegrown attempts at forcing the British out of India having failed, Guru Ram Singh turned to petitioning the assistance of foreign powers for his goal of independence. He turned his attention toward the Russian Empire, a hostile state of the British.

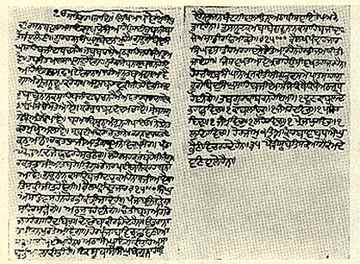
Letter authored by Guru Ram Singh directed to the czar of Russia, requesting him to help fight against the British imperialists in India. Courtesy of the Russian embassy in Delhi.

Baba Gurcharan Singh, a Namdhari Sikh, succeeded in establishing contacts with Russian authorities in 1879 and was referred to as 'The ambassador from the priest of the Punjab Sikhs arrives in Samarkand' in the consular files of Turkestan Governor-General.

The Russians declined to assist Guru Ram Singh in his endeavor as they were wary of embroiling themselves in a war with the British.

=== Persecution and exile ===
The Sikh sentiments were largely hurt by the provincial Government's supported actions, but they were helpless and none dared to challenge the imperial Government. Given these developments which threatened the cultural milieu of Punjab in general, and of the Sikhs in particular, Namdhari Sikhs engaged in conflicts with the imperial Government-sponsored anti-social elements, leading to clashes in 1871 and 1872.

As a result, the British would arrest and execute 65 Namdharis in January 1872. They were executed by being blown from the gun (cannon).

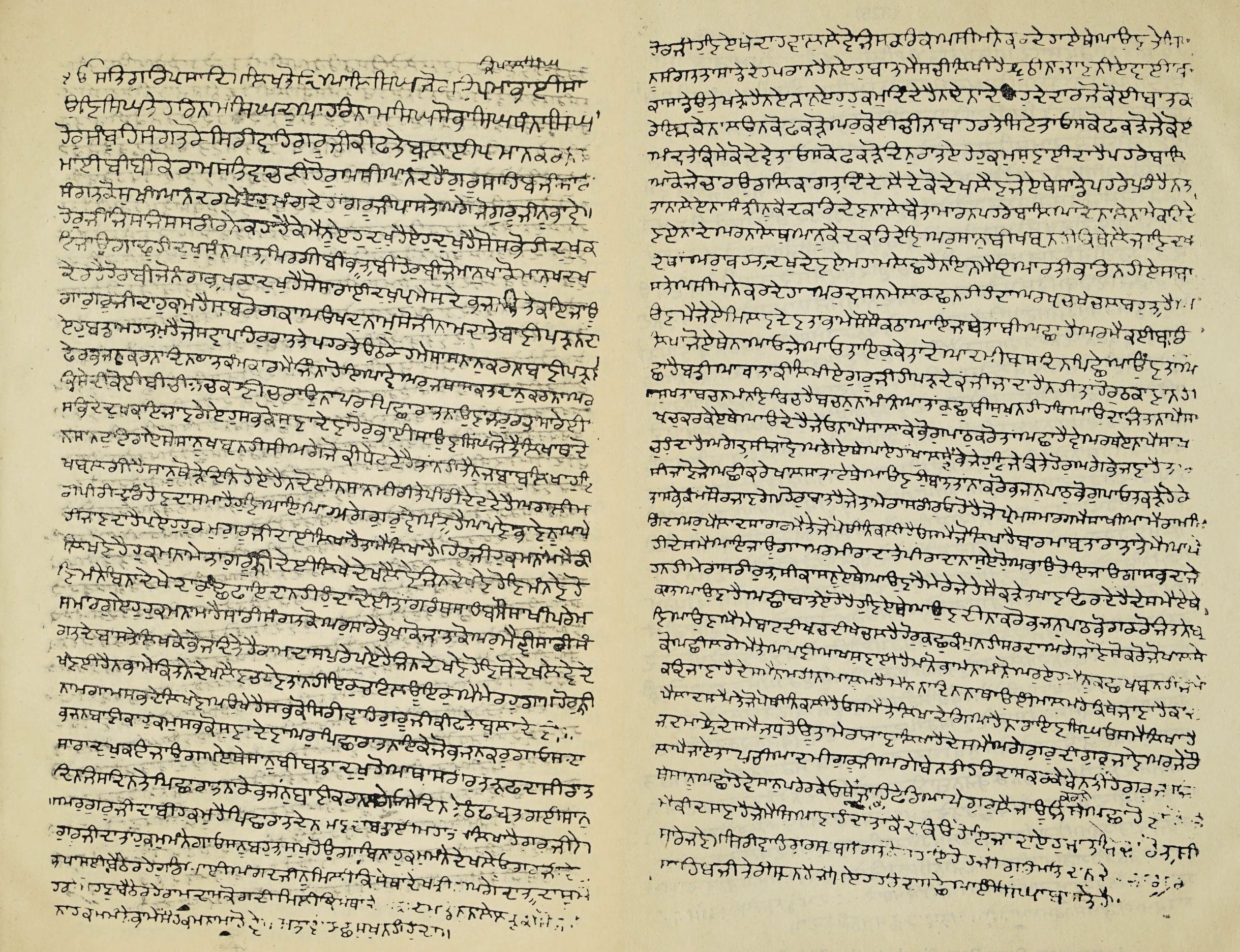
Letter from Namdhari Guru Ram Singh to the Sikh sangat (congregation)

The British authorities inflicted terrible punishments on Namdhari Sikhs and Guru Ram Singh was exiled. Namdhari Guru Ram Singh kept communicating with his disciples in Punjab through the means of secret letters termed Hukamnamas. These, along with his brother Namdhari Guru Hari Singh, kept the morale of largely persecuted Sikhs high and they remained and worked as the opponents of British imperialism. The movement continued its efforts and later collaborated with Indian National Congress in civil disobedience movement."

=== Disputed passing ===
According to the British, Guru Ram Singh died in exile on 29 November 1885 in Mergui, Burma (now Myeik, Myanmar). However, the Namdhari sect heavily disputes this as per their beliefs, they are convinced that he remains alive till the present-day. They further believe he shall return one day to lead their community once again.

A telegraph issued from Rangoon on 8 December 1885 reports on the death of Guru Ram Singh to "old-age", "diarrhea", and "general debility". According to Sikh historian Jaswinder Singh, the telegraph's contents claiming Guru Ram Singh had died is contradicted by a letter written by Charles Bernard, Chief Commissioner of British Burma, on 23 August 1886, addressed to Atar Singh of Bhadaur, that "Ram Singh, Kuka, is going to be transferred to a more remote spot, where communication with him will be less easy". Furthermore, Jaswinder Singh notes "... the Jail Report Statement No. XVI — Vital, showing the deaths of convicts in the jails and subsidiary jails of British Burma, during the year 1885, does not list any death at Mergui due to 'Dysentery and Diarrhoea.' The column No. I in the proforma has been kept blank." Also, Jaswinder Singh states that after Guru Hari Singh (brother of Guru Ram Singh) received the claimed personal items of Guru Ram Singh after his brother's alleged death, the items he received did not belong to his brother. Jaswinder Singh concludes the following: "It can, therefore, be concluded that Guru Ram Singh did not expire; on 29th November 1885. Either he was transferred to a ‘more remote spot’ as intimated by the Chief Commissioner of British Burma, or disappeared quietly from the prison."

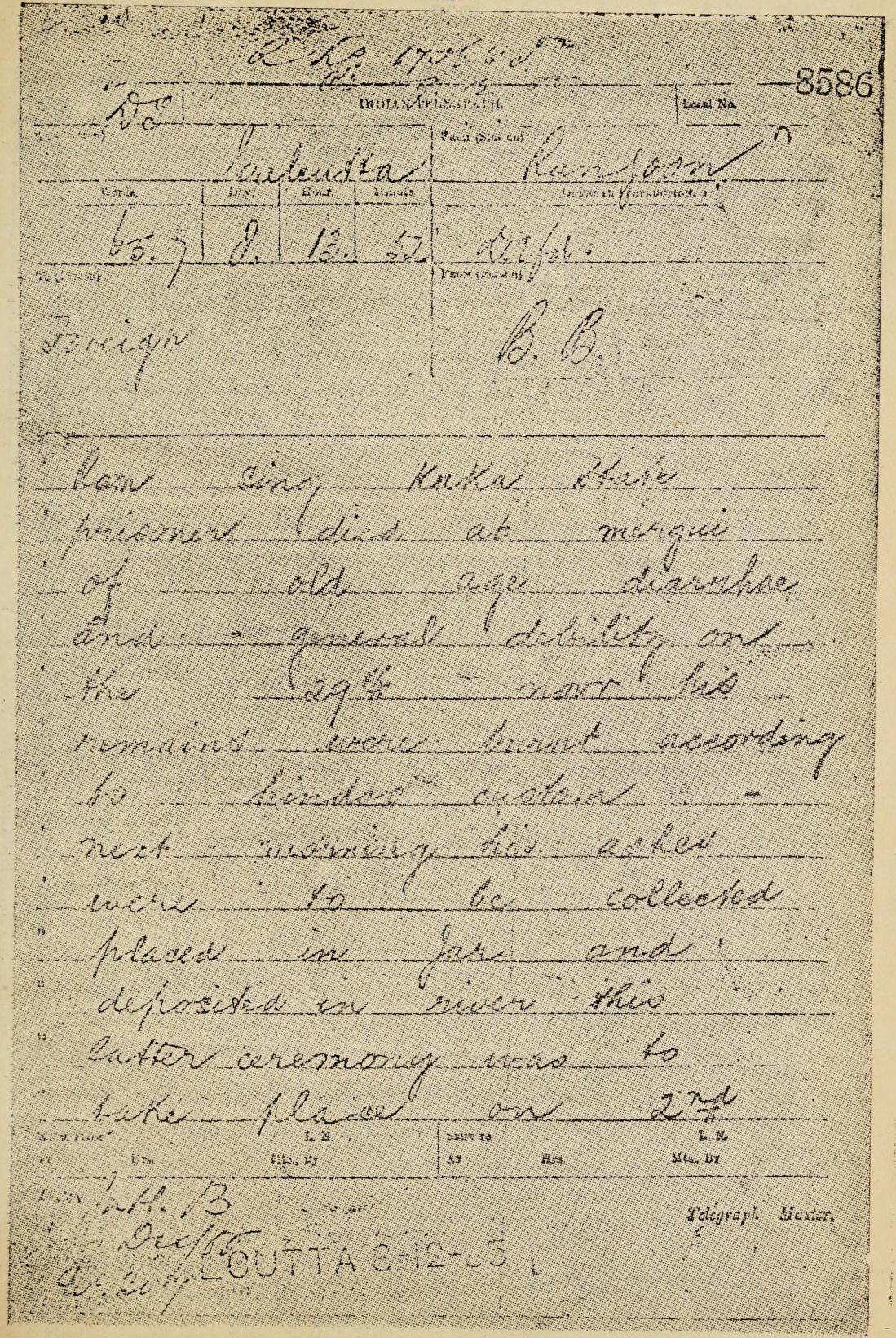
Telegram from Rangoon, British Burma reporting the supposed death of Ram Singh Kuka, 8 December 1885 (one)

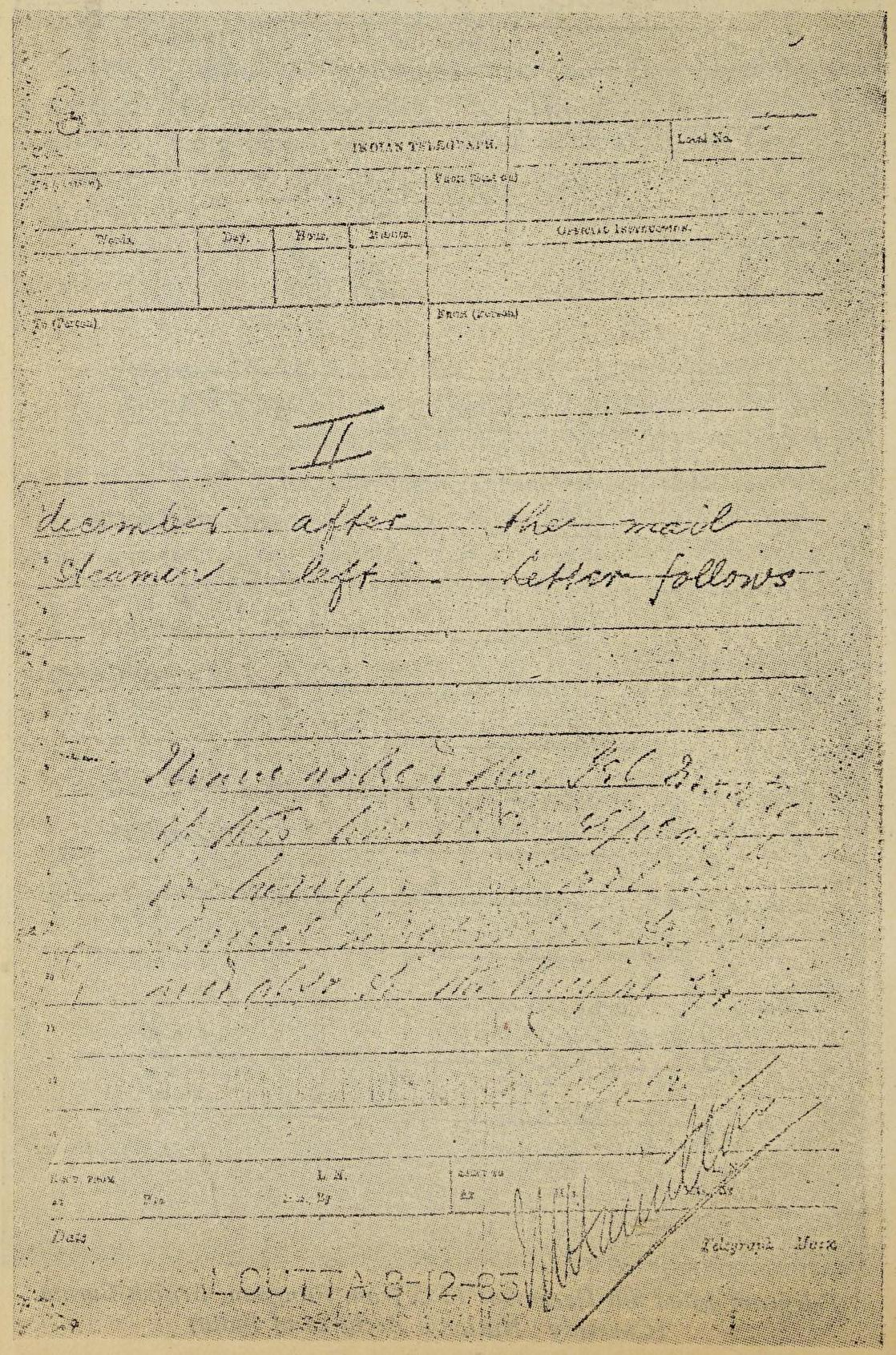
Second part of the telegram

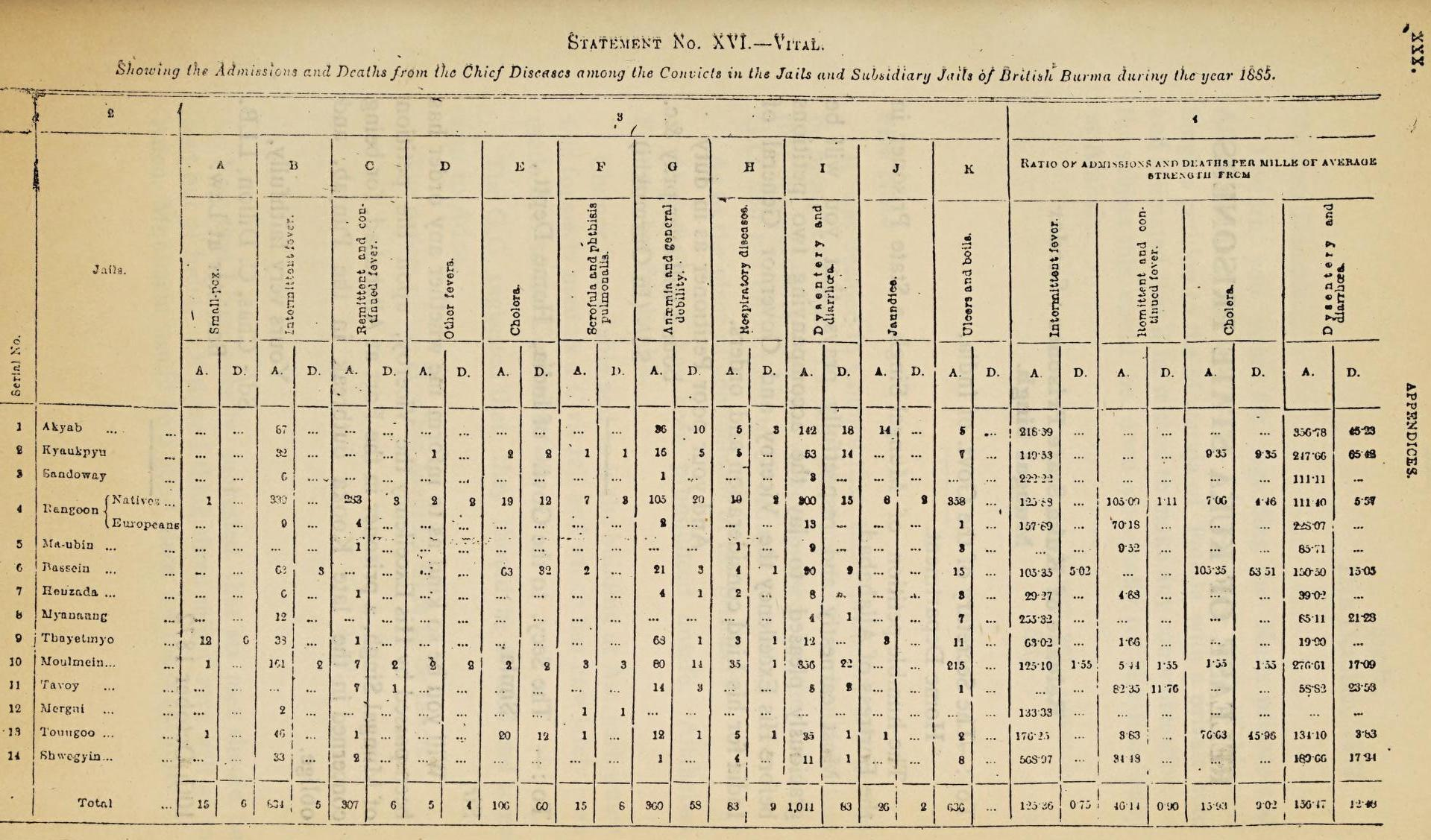
Jail Report Statement No. XVI — Vital, showing the deaths of convicts in the jails and subsidiary jails of British Burma, during the year 1885

== Legacy ==
=== Views of eminent personalities ===
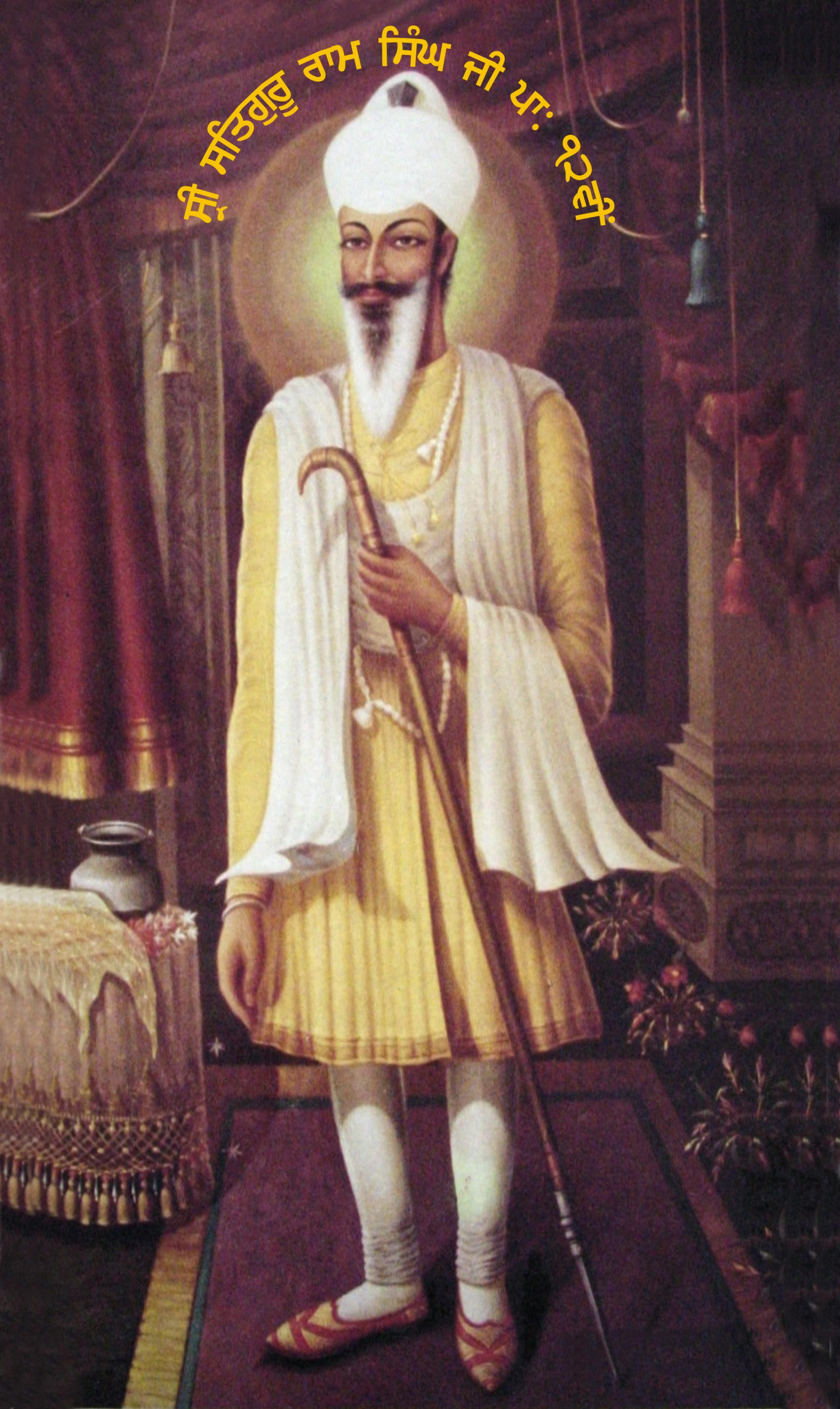
Satguru Ram Singh Ji, painted by Sant Waryam Singh 'Musavar', circa 20th century

If the whole nation understands the path of Non-cooperation shown to the nation by Satguru Ram Singh, then in few days India can get herself counted among the independent nations of the world. - Jawahar Lal Nehru, Indian freedom fighter

The country will always feel proud of the sacrifices given by Namdhari under the banner of freedom fight initiated by Guru Ram Singh, now again there's going to be a test of love for the nation of the Indians. - Subhash Chandra Bose, Indian freedom fighter

Guru Ram Singh considered independence as an element of religion. The task of non-cooperation campaigned vehemently by Mahatma Gandhi was propagated by Guru Ram Singh fifty years back among the Namdharis. - Rajendra Prasad, Indian freedom fighter

The revered Baba Ram Singh Ji was truly a transformational personality of the century. - S. Shamsher Singh Ashok, Research scholar

I cannot deny the fact that he (Guru Ram Singh) reinvigorated Gurmat among the Sikhs and taught patriotism to Sikhs by starting non-cooperation movement against the foreign Government. - Master Tara Singh, Akali leader

Subsequent to Guru Gobind Singh, only Baba Ram Singh has been a braveheart in India. Because of this, it was natural for the faithful ones to see him as a reflection of Guru Gobind Singh. - Sardar Kapur Singh, ICS, Former DC
