= Kapur Singh Ghuman =

Punjabi writer

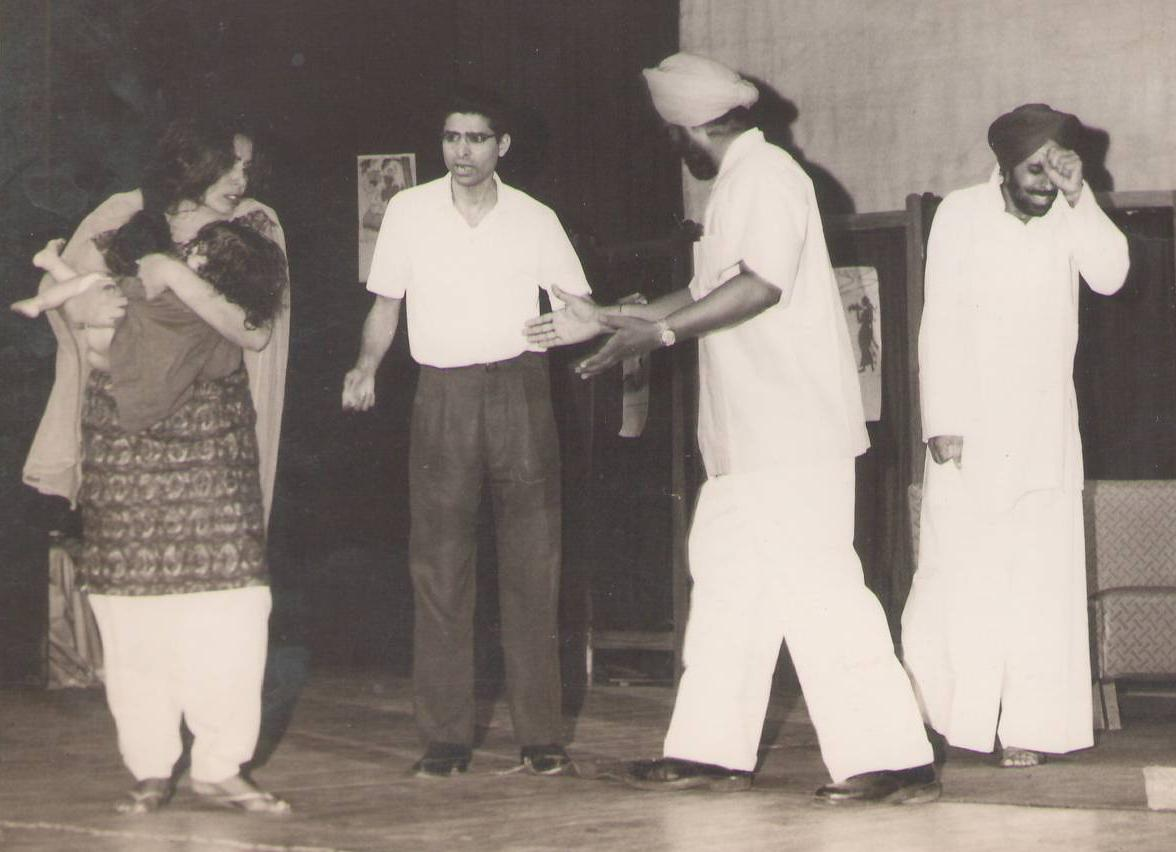
A still from stage play Jeeundi Lash written by Kapur Singh Ghumman

Kapur Singh Ghuman was a Punjabi writer and theatre actor born in a Jat Sikh family. He was awarded a Sahitya Academy Award in 1984 for his Punjabi play Pagal Lok and was the director of the Punjab Languages Department. He was born in 1927 and died in a car accident in 1986.

== Dramas ==
- Jeeundi Laash, 1962
- Zindaghi Ton Door, 1966
- Putalighar, 1966
- Pardean De aar Par, 1967
- Atita De Parchavem, 1967
- Jhungalmata, 1967
- Anahoni, 1968
- Manas Ki Ek Jaat, 1969
- Kach De Gajare, 1969
- Wismadu Naad, 1969
- Zaildar, 1972
- Mook Sansar, 1973
- Man Antar Ki Pira, 1975
- Bujharat
- Azadi Da Suphana
- Rani Kokilan, 1979
- Pagal Lok, 1982
- Roda Jalali, 1982
- Santaap, 1983
- Noorjahan
