= Nachhattar =

Indian writer

Nachhattar is an Indian writer of Punjabi literature. He won the Sahitya Akademi Award in 2017 for his novel Slow Down.

== Biography ==
Nachhattar was born in a dalit family in Barnala district, Punjab, India. He worked as a factory worker after completing his matriculation. He went on to work as a clerk at Punjab Agricultural University while continuing his studies. He became a bank manager in Delhi and started living there.

He wrote the novel Slow Down in 2012 about the recession in the Indian economy, for which he won the Sahitya Akademi Award in 2017. In 2020, he announced his intention to return the award in support of the 2020-2021 Indian farmers' protest.
