= Tara Singh Kamil =

Punjabi poet

Tara Singh Kamil (15 August 1929 - 1993) was a Punjabi poet. He won the Sahitya Akademi Award in 1989 for his poetry collection Kahikashan.

== Biography ==
Tara Singh was born in village Hookran, Hoshiarpur district, British Punjab (now Punjab, India). He lived in New Delhi.

He was a carpenter by profession and frequently performed at kavi darbars (poetry recitals).

== Literary style ==
Tara Singh's Sahitya Akademi Award winning collection Kahikashan has two primary themes; love and the situation of Punjab. His love poetry is not romantic poetry but "of a different hue".
