= Charan Dass Sidhu =

Indian writer (1938–2013)

Charan Dass Sidhu (born 14 March 1938 Bham, Hoshiarpur district, Punjab, British India – 18 November 2013) was an Indian playwright and author writing in Punjabi.

== Books and plays ==
- Merā nāṭakī safara
- Pañja khūha wāle ḍarāmā
- Alexander's victory
- Amānata dī lāṭhī : nāṭaka
- Ambīāṃ nūṃ taraseṅgī
- Bābā Bantū nāṭaka
- Bhagat Singh shahīd : tīn ḍrāme
- Bhagata Siṅgha shahīda : nāṭaka tikkaṛī
- Bhajano
- Ghalib-e-Azam

== Awards ==
Sidhu won the Sahitya Akademi Award in 2003 for Bhagat Singh Shahid : Natak Tikri (Play).

== See also ==
- List of Sahitya Akademi Award winners for Punjabi
