= Jaswant Deed =

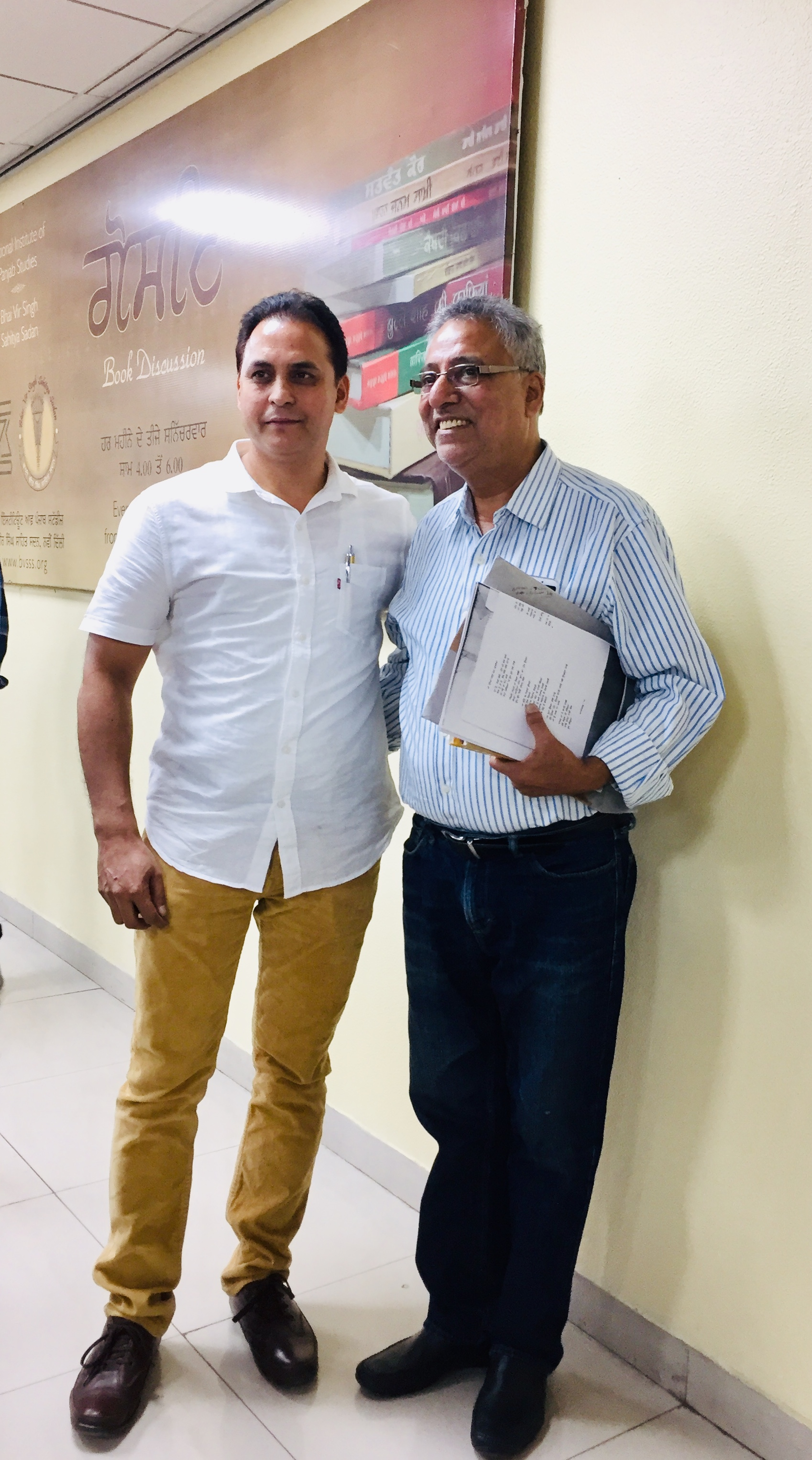
- Jaswant Deed (right) with Dr. Kulvir Gojra at Bhai Vir Singh Sahitya Sadan, Delhi
- Born: 11 March 1954 (age 72); Shahkot, Jalandhar, Punjab
- Occupations: Poet; Novelist
- Writing career
- Notable awards: Sahitya Akademi Award, 2007 for Kamandal

Jaswant Deed (born 11 March 1954 in Shahkot, Jalandhar Punjab) is a Punjabi poet.

== Books ==
Published Work:

Poetry

1. Bache Ton Dardi Kavita – (1985-2003)
2. Achanchet – (1990-2003)
3. Awaaz Ayegi Aje – (1996-2003)
4. Ghundi – (2001-2003)
5. Kamandal – (2004-2009)
6. Aawagvn – (2012)
7. Tera Rang Nachave(select poems) – (2014)

Prose

1. Dharti Hor Pre – (2010)
2. Khaddi – (2017)

Short story

Ik Lapp Yadan Di – (1970)

Edited

Desh Vand Dian Kahanian – (1985) (short stories of partition of India and Pakistan)

Translations

1. Jungle Di Kahani - From English to Punjabi -(1980)
2. Yashpal – From Hindi to Punjabi – (1985)
3. Guru Ladho Re - From Hindi to Punjabi – (1988)
4. Ruko Prithvi- selected poems of Pablo Neruda – From Hindi to Punjabi. -2015
5. Kamladas- (Poems of Kamla Das from English to Panjabi)

== Works ==
=== In Digital Media ===
- Trained from Film and television institute of India, (FTII Pune) in film and TV productions.
- Thirty-two years’ experience in Television & Radio Productions. (Digital and Analogue)

=== TV/Film Productions ===
- Produced approximately 50 TV documentaries/Films on life and works of eminent writers/painters and other well-known personalities.
- Produced numerous special musicals & cultural heritage programs.
- Produced TV shows and dramas.
- Produced special series of documentaries, features on the history of Siri Guru Granth Sahib and its message of universal brotherhood, peace, and communal harmony.
- Ex-Director, Television Center, Doordarshan Kendra (Govt. of India TV channel) Shimla.
- Digital Productions

=== Produced in Canada, a documentary on Ghadar Movement ===
- Hind Vasio Rakhna Yaad Sanu (2013)
- Directed a short film of 45 minutes duration titled ‘Jalpari’ Canada, 2018.

== Awards ==
- He won the Sahitya Akademi Award for his book Kamandal (Poetry) – 2007
- Best Punjabi poet of the state (Poet Laureate) Awarded by Punjab Language Department – 2010
- Best Panjabi prose book (Dharti Hor Pre), Language department Punjab – 2008
- Prof. Mohan Singh Award, GNDU Amritsar (Poetry: ‘Bache Ton Dardi Kavita’) – 1985
