= Niranjan Singh Tasneem =

Punjabi novelist (1929–2019)

Niranjan Tasneem
- Born: 2 May 1929; Ambersar, Punjab, British India
- Died: 17 August 2019 (aged 90)

Niranjan Singh Tasneem (May 2, 1929 - August 17, 2019) was a Punjabi novelist.

== Books ==
- Gawāce aratha
- Parachāweṃ
- Gwache arth
- Reta chala
- Adhunik parvirtian ate
- Ajanabī loka : nāwala
- At the crossroads
- Ādhunika prawaratīāṃ ate Pañjābī nāwala
- Āīne de rūbarū : sāhitaka sawaijīwanī
- Glittering sands
- Studies in modern Punjabi literature
- Shadows
- Qadir Yar

== Awards ==
Tasneem won the Sahitya Akademi Award in 1999 for his book Gawache Arth (Novel) and the Punjabi Sahit Rattan Award in 2015.
