= Harbhajan Singh Halwarvi =

Punjabi poet

Harbhajan Singh Halwarvi (1943 - 2003) was a Punjabi poet. He won the Sahitya Akademi Award in 2002 for his poetry collection Pullan Ton Paar.

== Biography ==
Halwarvi was born in 1943 in village Halwara, district Ludhiana, Punjab, India. He did post graduation in Punjabi and Mathematics. He started working with the Punjabi newspaper Punjabi Tribune in 1977 as an assistant editor and went on to become the acting editor and editor. He stopped working at the Punjabi Tribune in 1997 but joined again in 2000 to work until 2002.

He was a part of the Naxalite movement and went to jail multiple times.

== Awards ==
- Bhai Vir Singh Award by Languages Department, Government of Punjab
- Shromani Punjabi Patrakar Award by the Government of Punjab
- 2002 - Sahitya Akademi Award
