= Mohinder Singh Sarna =

Mohinder Singh Sarna (1923, Rawalpindi, Punjab, British India - 2001) was an Indian civil servant and novelist who wrote in the Punjabi language. He won the 1994 Sahitya Akademi Award for his short story collection Nawen Yug De Waris. He served as an officer of Indian Audit and Accounts Service from the 1950 batch and is the father of diplomat Navtej Sarna.

== Books ==
- Naweṃ yugga de wārasa
- Aba jhūjana ko dāu : mahāṅkāwi
- Aurata īmāna
- Camakaura.
- Dukh Bhanjan Tera Naam
- Gāthā g̲h̲ama de māriāṃ dī
- Inheritors of a new age
- Katala pañjāṃ pạ̄ṇīāṃ dā : desha-waṇḍa dīāṃ kahāṇīāṃ
- Kāliñgā.

== Awards ==
Sarna won the Sahitya Akademi Award in 1994 for his book Nawen Yug De Waris (Short stories)

== See also ==
- List of Sahitya Akademi Award winners for Punjabi
