= Ghulam Nabi Khayal =

Indian poet and writer (died 2023)

- Born: 4 March 1939; Srinagar, Jammu and Kashmir, British Raj
- Died: 15 October 2023 (aged 84) [Srinagar, Jammu and Kashmir
- Occupations: Poet, essayist, Journalist, writer and translator

Ghulam Nabi Khayal (4 March 1939 – 15 October 2023) was an Indian Kashmiri poet and essayist. He authored 30 books in Kashmiri, Urdu and English.

Khayal was the winner of Sahitya Akademi Award but he returned the award as a sign of protest. He became the first Kashmiri to return the literary award as a sign of protest in the valley.

Ghulam Nabi Khayal died on 15 October 2023, at the age of 84.

== Books ==
- Allama Iqbal aur Tehreek-e-Azadi-e-Kashmir
- Gaashir Munaar
- Chinar Rang
- Fikr-e-Khayal
- Iqbal aur Tehreek-e-Azadi-e-Kashmir
- Karvaan-e-Khayal
- Khayalat
- Khayal-e-Qalam
- Pragaash
- Kashmir, The Burning of a Paradise

== Awards ==
Sahitya Akademi Award in year 1975.
