= Paul Kaur =

Indian Punjabi writer

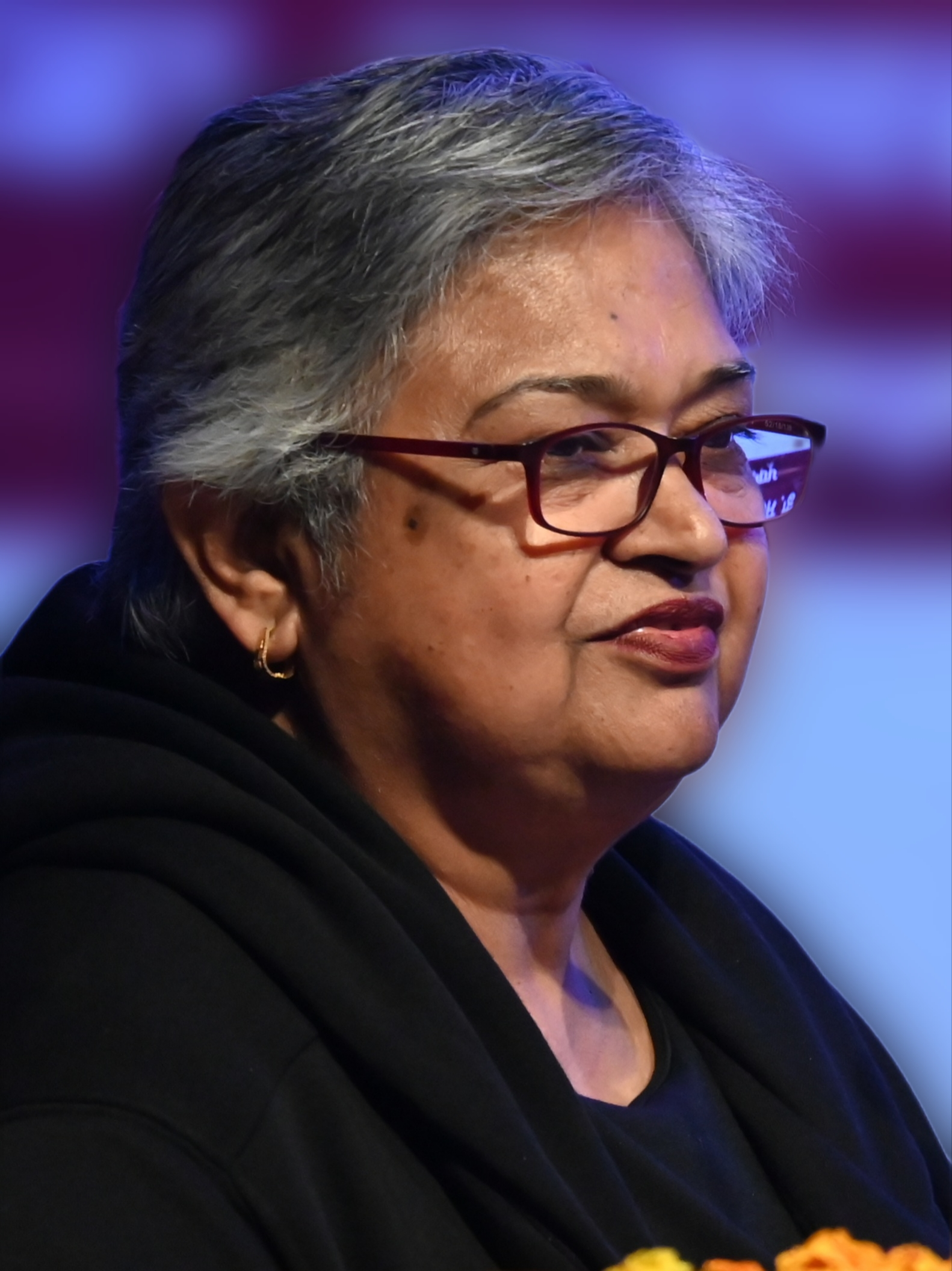
Paul Kaur in 2024.

Paul Kaur (born 1956) is a Punjabi writer. She won the Sahitya Akademi Award in 2024 for her book Sun Gunvanta Sun Budhivanta: Itihaasnama Punjab.

== Biography ==
Kaur was born to Surjit Kaur and Surain Singh in 1956 in Kalomajra village, Patiala district. She is the youngest of eight children and had to face challenges in order to get educated. Her brother supported her in pursuing higher education. She went on to receive a PhD and retired as a lecturer in Ambala.
