= Sukhjit (Punjabi writer) =

Indian writer

Sukhjit (1961 or 1962 – 12 February 2024) was a Punjabi writer. He won the Sahitya Akademi Award in 2022 for his short-story collection Main Aynghosh Nahi.

== Biography ==
Sukhjit started literary writing in 1992 when his first short-story got published in a magazine. In 1997, he published his first poetry collection Rangan Da Manovigyan.

He died on 12 February 2024 at the age of 62 after a brief illness.

== Works ==
=== Poetry collection ===
- Rangan Da Manovigyan

=== Short-story collections ===
- Antra
- Hun Main Rape Enjoy Kardi Haan
- Main Aynghosh Nahi

=== Autobiography ===
- Main Jaisa Hoon, Waisa Kyu Hu
