= Harinder Singh Mehboob =

Punjabi poet

Harinder Singh Mehboob (born 1937, Chakk, in Lyallpur district Punjab, British India) was a Punjabi poet.

== Books ==
- Sahije racio K̲h̲alasā
- History and philosophy of Khalsa Sect
- Ilāhī nadara de paiṇḍe
- Jhanāṃ dī rāta

== Awards ==
Mehboob won the Sahitya Akademi Award in 1991 for his poetry Jhanaan dī rāat .

== See also ==
- List of Sahitya Akademi Award winners for Punjabi
