= Mitter Sain Meet =

Punjabi novelist

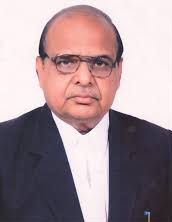
- Born: Mitter Sain Goyal; 20 October 1952; Bhotna, Punjab, India
- Education: Law Graduate from Panjab University Campus, Chandigarh
- Occupations: Advocate, Punjabi Writer
- Spouse: Raj Rani
- Children: Chat Con
- Writing career
- Notable works: Novels: Tahteesh and Kaurav Sabha

Mitter Sain Meet (born 20 October 1952) is a Punjabi novelist.

== Books ==
=== Novels ===
Below is the list of books written by Meet along with their names in Gurmukhi:

- Aag de Beej (Punjabi: ਅੱਗ ਦੇ ਬੀਜ)
- Kafla (Punjabi: ਕਾਫਲਾ)
- Tafteesh (Punjabi: ਤਫਤੀਸ਼)
- Katehra (Punjabi: ਕਟਹਿਰਾ)
- Sudharghar (Punjabi: ਸੁਧਾਰ ਘਰ)
- Kaorav Sabha (Punjabi: ਕੌਰਵ ਸਭਾ)

=== Short stories ===
- Punarwas (Punjabi: ਪੁਨਰਵਾਸ)
- Laam (Punjabi: ਲਾਮ)
- Thos Saboot (Punjabi: ਠੋਸ ਸਬੂਤ)

=== Law books ===
- Trial Management
- Pro Prosecution Case Law on Custody and Bails
- Taftishi Officer dee Kanun Diary (Punjabi)
- Faujdari Kanun dee Mudli Jankari (Punjabi)

== Awards ==
- 2008, Sahitya Akademi Award for his novel Sudhar Ghar.
- In 2008, Meet won Pt. Gobind Balab Pant Award from Bureau of Police Research and Development, Govt. of India, New Delhi for his trilogy of novels RAM RAJYA (Hindi).
