= Kirpal Kazak =

Punjabi writer

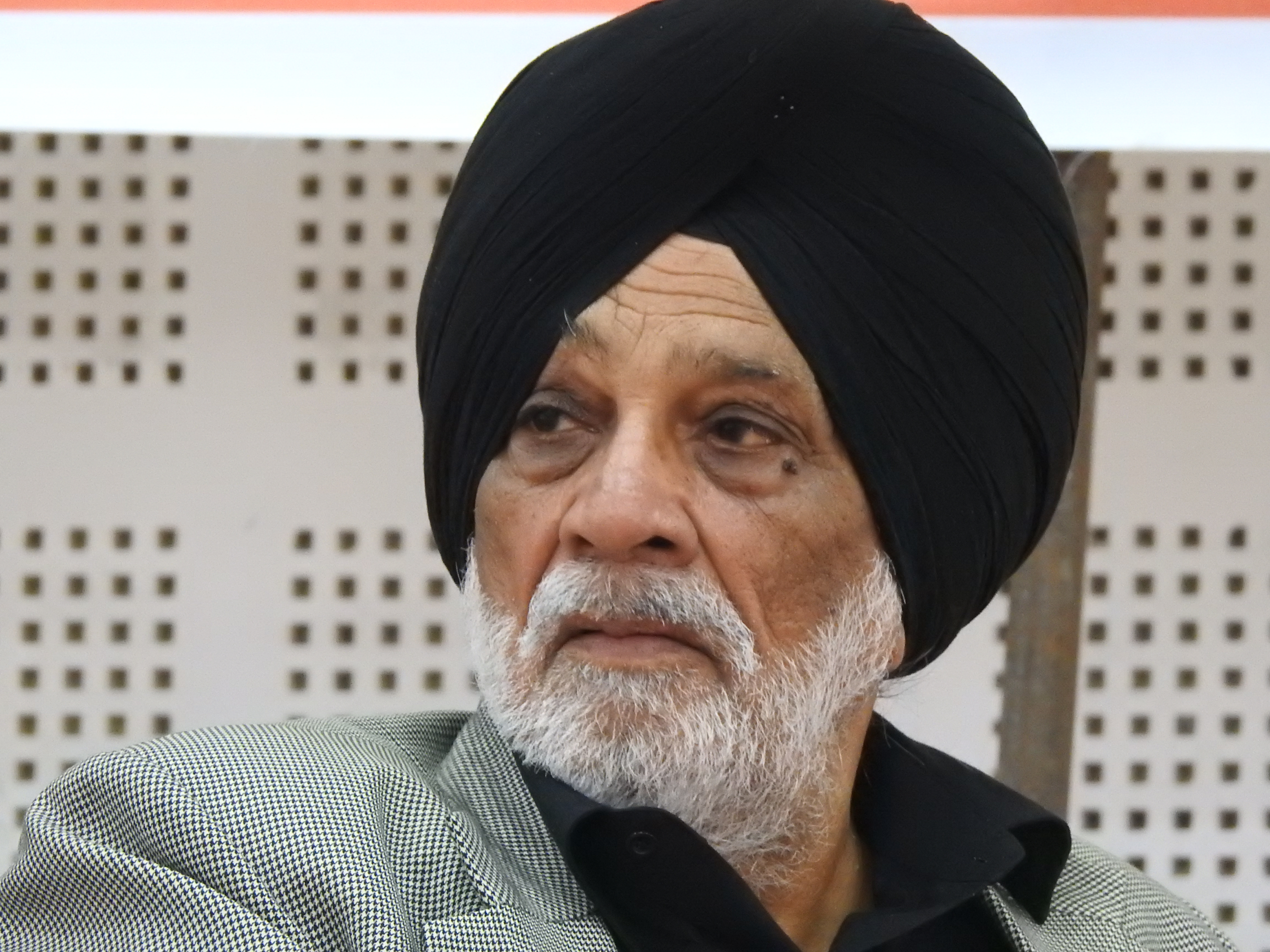
Kirpal Kazak, Punjabi language writer

Kirpal Kazak (born 15 January 1943) is a Punjabi writer. He won the Sahitya Akademi Award in 2019 for his short story collection Antheen.

== Biography ==
Kazak was born in village Baloke, Sheikhupura district, British Punjab (now Pakistan). His father, Sadhu Singh Ramgarhia, was well versed in Arabic, Persian, Sanskrit, and Punjabi. The family migrated to Fatehpur Majra village, Patiala district, Punjab, India after the partition of India.

He worked as a carpenter and a mason as a youngster.

He started his writing career by contributing to Punjabi magazine Nagmani. In 1972, he published his first book Kala Ilm.

He was appointed as a folklore assistant at Punjabi University, Patiala where he researched the culture of nomadic tribes from Punjab such as Sikligars and Gadia Lohars.
