= Khalid Hussain (Punjabi writer) =

Indian Writer

Khalid Hussain (born 1945) is a Punjabi writer. He won the Sahitya Akademi Award in 2021 for his short-story collection Sullan Da Salan. He is a former bureaucrat.

== Biography ==
Khalid was born in 1945 in a kashmiri speaking family Udhampur district of the Jammu and Kashmir princely state. During the 1947 partition of India, he fled the violence with his mother but seven male members of his family, including his brothers, father and grandfather, were killed. He spent the following seven years in refugee camps.

The family settled in Ustad Mohalla, old Jammu city, which was predominantly Punjabi speaking. He writes in both Punjabi and Urdu.

He started working as a mason and got promoted as a clerk. He went on to retire as a secretary rank officer.

== Works ==
=== Short-story collections ===
- Te Jehlum Wagda Reha
- Gori Fasal Di Sodagar
- Doonge Panian Da Dukh
- Baldi Baraf Da Saik
- Gwachi Jhanjhar Di Cheek

=== Novelle ===
- Noori Rishman
