= Aman Sethi =

Indian journalist and writer (born 1983)

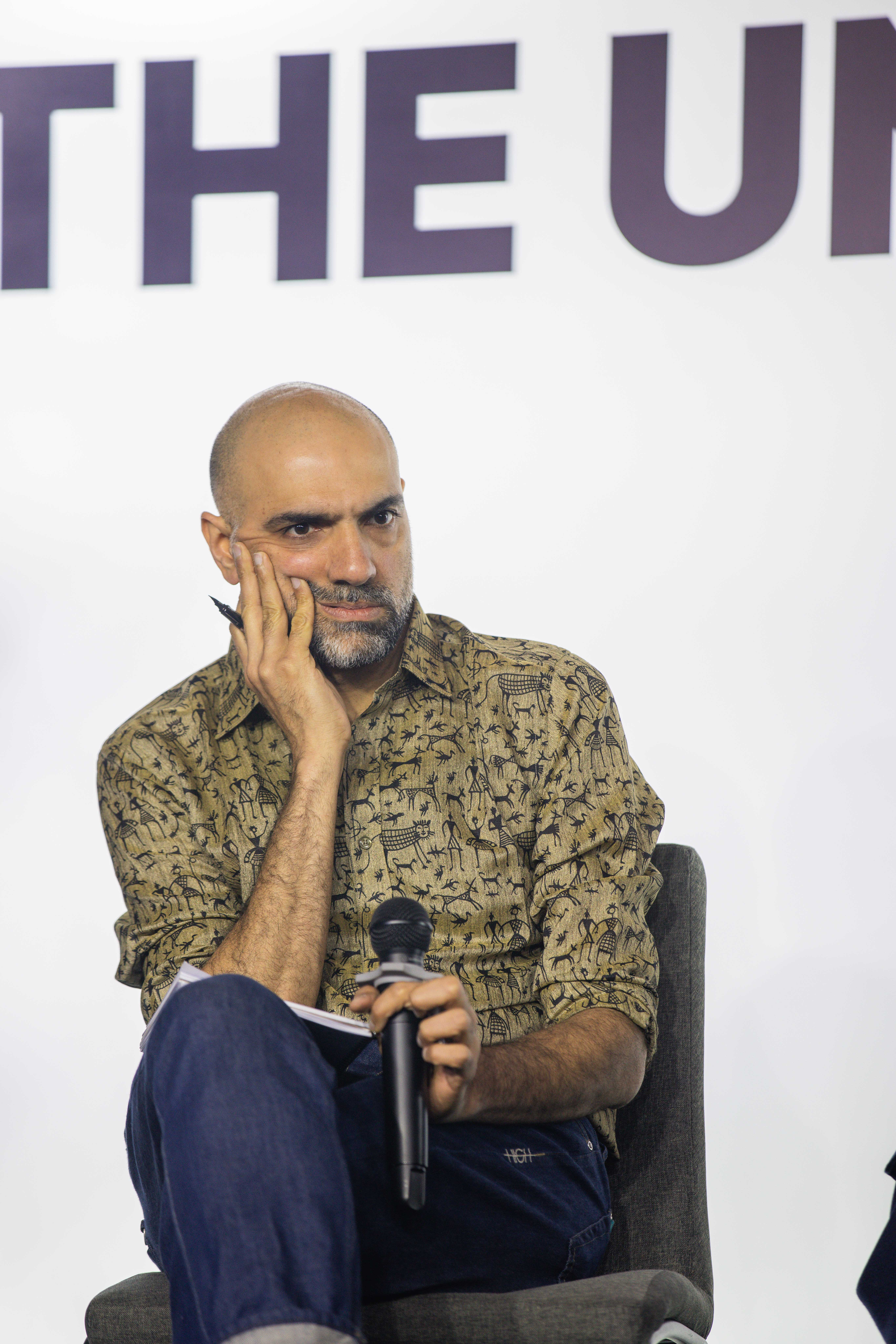
- Aman Sethi at the LMF 2025 conference in Lviv, Ukraine
- Born: 1983 (age 42–43); Mumbai, India
- Education: St. Stephen's College
- Occupations: Journalist, writer
- Writing career
- Genre: Realism
- Notable work: A Free Man

Aman Sethi is an Indian journalist and writer. He is the editor-in-chief of openDemocracy.

Sethi was editor-in-chief of HuffPost India until it ceased operations in November, 2020. He is known for his debut A Free Man, a work of narrative reportage. Born in 1983 in Mumbai, Sethi completed his schooling at Sardar Patel Vidyalaya, Delhi. He studied chemistry at St. Stephen's College, Delhi before moving on to study journalism at Asian College of Journalism, Chennai and business journalism in 2008 at Columbia University Graduate School of Journalism as an Inlaks Scholar. As Chhattisgarh correspondent for The Hindu newspaper Sethi reported extensively on Maoist insurgency in the state for two years. He also won the International Red Cross committee award for the best Indian print media article on humanitarian issues in 2011.

In August 2012, Sethi was named The Hindu's Africa correspondent, based in Addis Ababa.

== Writing ==
Sethi's first book, A Free Man, was a non-fiction work about the life of an individual named Mohammed Ashraf, but also about Delhi and its transformation. It won the 2011 Crossword Book Award. Oprah Winfrey's website endorsed Sethi's debut book as one of the must reads of November, 2012.

Sethi was also awarded the Yuva Puraskar (Youth Award) by the Sahitya Akademi for the best English book written by a young author in 2012. In 2015, he returned the award to express "solidarity with several eminent writers who have recently returned their awards to highlight their concern and anxiety over the shrinking space for free expression and growing intolerance towards difference of opinion".
