= Mohan Bhandari (writer) =

Punjabi writer (1937–2021)

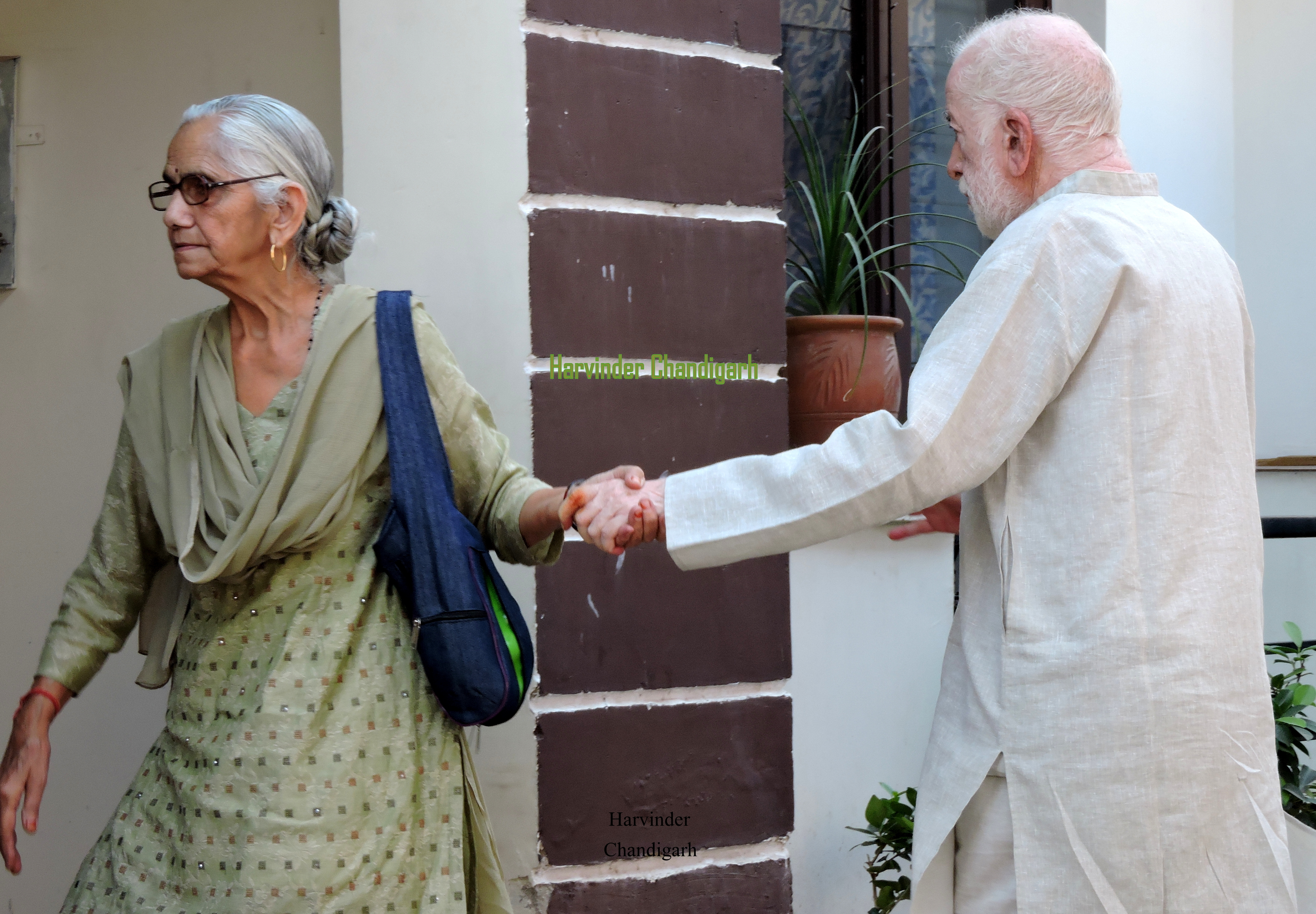
- Born: 14 February 1937 Banbhaura, Sangrur district, Punjab, British India
- Died: 26 November 2021 (aged 84) Chandigarh, India
- Language: Punjabi

Mohan Bhandari (14 February 1937 – 26 November 2021) was a Punjabi writer who received the Sahitya Akademi Award in 1998, but later returned it in 2015.

== Life and career ==
Mohan Bhandari was born in 1937 in the Banbhaura village of Sangrur district, Punjab. Bhandari was influenced by Urdu writer Manto alongside Russian authors including Gorky, Dostoevsky, Tolstoy and Chekhov. He is credited with as many as 15 short story collection books which include critically acclaimed Kaath di Latt, Til-Chouli, Gora Basha among others. Bhandari received Sahitya Akademi Award in 1998 for his collection of short stories, Moon di Akh.

Bhandari died on 26 November 2021 at the age of 84 in Chandigarh.
