= Rahamat Tarikere =

Indian writer

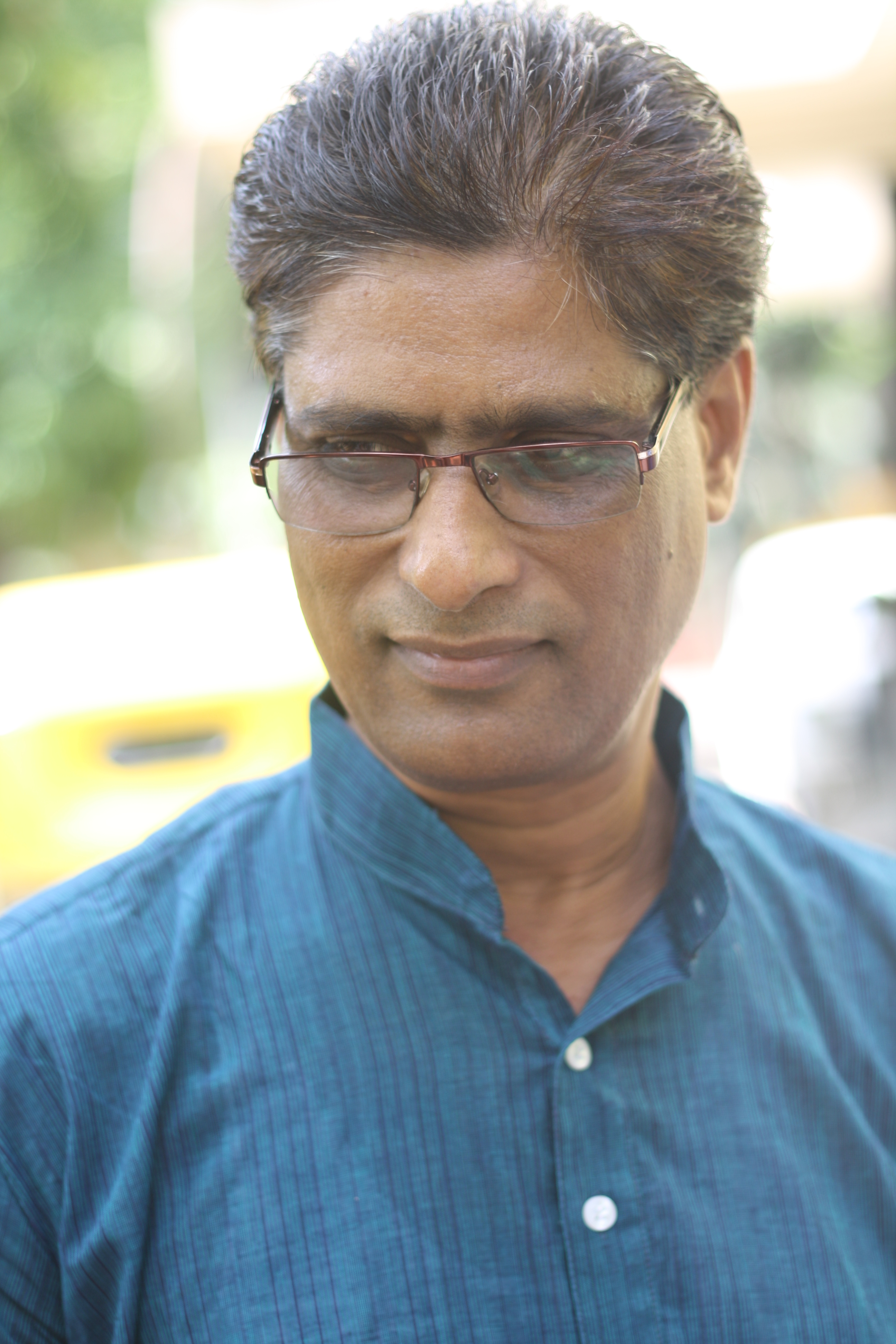
- Born: K. M. Rahamat Ullah; 26 August 1959; Samatala, Tarikere, Chikmagalur district, Karnataka
- Occupations: Writer, academic
- Writing career
- Language: Kannada
- Subject: Various Themes
- Notable work: Kattiyanchina Daari
- Notable awards: Sahitya Akademi Award (2010)

Rahamat Tarikere (born 26 August 1959) is a Kannada writer, critic and teacher. He is a retired professor from Kannada University at Hampi.

== Early life and education ==
He was born on 26 August 1959 at Samatala village in Tarikere Taluk in Chikkamagaluru district in Karnataka state, India. He completed his BA with a university First rank. He bagged seven gold medals for the M.A. in Kannada Literature from Mysore University.

== Literary work ==
- Prathi samskruthi (collection of articles) 1993
- Maradolagina Kicchu (collection of articles) 1984
- Samskruthika Adhyayana (2004)
- Loka Virodhigala Jotheyalli (15 Interviews) 2006
- Kattiyanchina Daari (collection of articles) 2009
- Prathi Samskruthi (A Study on Counter culture) 1993
- Karnatakada Sufigalu (A Study on Sufism of Karnataka) 1998
- Andamaan Kanasu (Travelogue) 2000
- KadaLi hokku bande (Travelogue) 2011
- Nadedashtoo naadu (Travelogue) 2012)
- Amirbai karnataki (Monograph) 2012
- Netu bidda navilu (collection of articles) 2013
- Karnatakada Moharrum (A Study on Moharam) 2014
- Samshodhana meemaamse (A handbook on Research Methodology 2014)
- Geramaradi KathegaLu (Ed. Folk tales) 2016
- karnataka shaktapantha (A Study on Shaktism) 2017
- Gurupra Qadri Tatvapada (Ed. songs a Sufi poet) 2017
- Tatvapada Praveshike (Ed.with Arun, Articles on Mysticism) 2017
- Sanna Sangathi (colelcton of Thoughts) 2018
- Nettara Sutaka (collection of articles) 2018
- Bagila Maathu (Prefaces 2018)
- Rajadharma (A Study on political texts of Mysore odeyars and Diwans) 2019
- Hittala jagattu (collection of lighter essays) 2019
- NyayanishTurigala Jatheyalli (15 Interviews) 2020
- Karnataka Gurupantha (A Study on Avadhuta and Aroodhas) 2020
- "HaasuHokku" (collection of articles) 2021
- Jerusalem (Travelogue)
- Kulume (Auto Biography)
- Bahutwa Karnataka (conceptual Discourse)

== Awards and recognition ==
- Karnataka Sahitya Academy Award for his collection of essays: Prathisamskruti (1993)
- Karnataka Sahitya Academy award for his Research on Sufis of Karnataka (1998)
- Karnataka Sahitya Academy award for his travelogue Andaman Kanasu 2000
- Sahitya Akademi Award in 2010 for Kattiyanchina Daari (returned)
- Karnataka Sahitya Akademy Honorary Award (2013) (Did not receive)
- Dr.Ambedkar Mookanayaka award for column writing from Karnataka Media Akademy, 2024
