= Jaswinder (poet) =

Jaswinder is a Punjabi poet. He won the Sahitya Akademi Award in 2014 for his poetry collection Agarbatti.

== Biography ==
Jaswinder was born and raised in village Kalalwalan, Bathinda district, Punjab, India. He is an engineer by profession.
