= Vanita =

Vanita is both a surname and a feminine given name. Notable people with the surname include:

== Given name ==
- Vanita Brock, a character in The Texas Chainsaw Massacre 2
- Vanita Gupta (born 1974), American lawyer
- Vanita Kayiwa, Ugandan airline transport pilot
- Vanita Kharat (born 1992), Indian actress
- Vanita Krouch (born 1980), American flag football player

== Surname ==
- Ruth Vanita (born 1955), Indian academic
- Vicky Vanita (1948–2007), Greek actress
