= Jaswinder Singh (novelist) =

Punjabi novelist

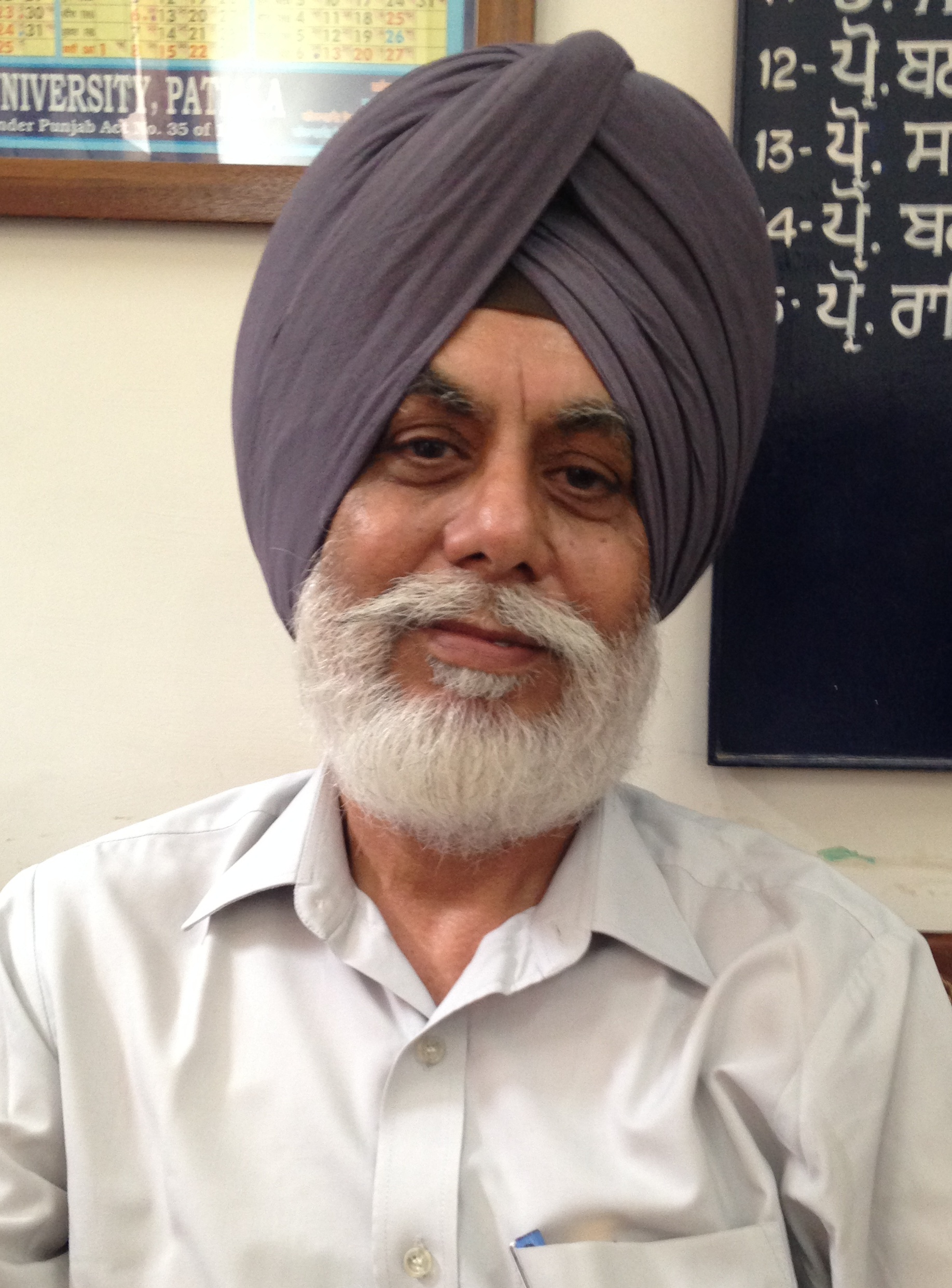
- Jaswinder Singh
- Born: 17 May 1954 (age 72); Jalandhar, Punjab, India
- Education: Punjabi University, Patiala
- Occupation: Novelist
- Spouse: Dhanwant Kaur

Jaswinder Singh (born 17 May 1954) is an Indian Punjabi novelist.

== Books ==
- Amarīkī Pañjābī kahāṇī : ika punara-mulāṅkana : khoja nibandha
- Amrici Punajbi kahani
- Bhartiya kavita sanchayan, Punjabi (1950-2010)
- Ghara dā̄ jīa : kahāṇī saṅgrahi
- Gurabak̲h̲asha Siṅgha Prītalaṛī dī swaijīwanī
- Mat-lok
- Māta loka : nāwala
- Merā piṇḍa : ālocanātamaka adhiaina
- Naweṃ kāwi sitāre
- Nawīṃ Pañjābī kawitā : pachāṇa cinnha

== Awards ==
Singh won the Sahitya Akademi Award in 2015 for his novel Maat Lok.

== See also ==
- List of Sahitya Akademi Award winners for Punjabi
