= Gurbachan Singh Bhullar =

Punajbi short-storywriter

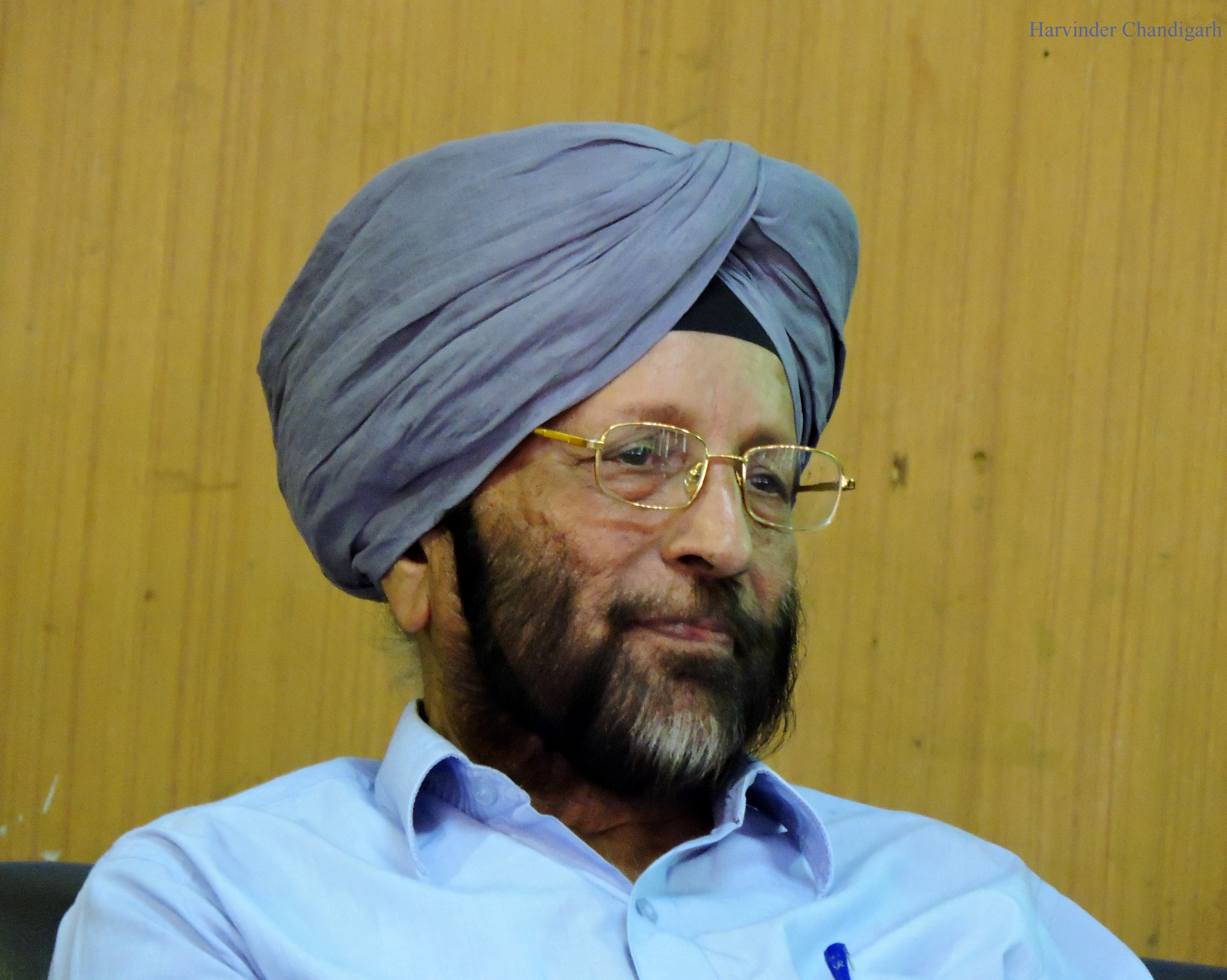
- Born: 18 March 1937 (age 89); Pitho village (now in Bathinda district of Punjab, India)
- Occupation: Author
- Writing career
- Language: Punjabi
- Period: 1956–present
- Genre: story
- Notable work: Agni-Kalas
- Literary movement: socialism

Gurbachan Singh Bhullar (born 18 March 1937) is a Punjabi author of short stories. In 2005, he was awarded the Sahitya Akademi Award for his short story collection Agni-Kalas.

On 11 October 2015 Bhullar joined other Punjabi writers in returning his Sahitya Akademi award to protest the assassination of M. M. Kalburgi and other liberal activists and writers.

== Life ==
Bhullar was born in 1937 in Pitho village in district Bhatinda, Punjab, India. His father, Hazura Singh, was an ex-serviceman, who had a keen interest in literature and had a personal library containing works of Punjabi literature. Bhullar consequently developed a taste for literature during his early childhood.

== Works ==
=== Short story collections ===
- Agni-Kalas
- Opra Mard
- Vakhtan Maare
- Janenee Janai Ta
- Main Gaznavi Nahin
- Dharti Dian Dheeian

=== Books ===
- Asa Marna Nahi
- Banere De Chirag
