= Ajmer Singh Aulakh =

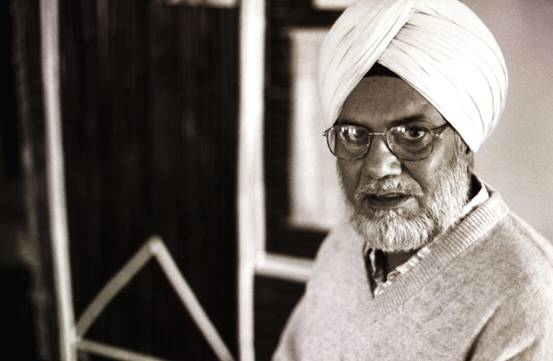
- Ajmer Singh Aulakh
- Born: 19 August 1942; Kumbharwal, Sangrur district, Punjab
- Died: 15 June 2017 (aged 74); Mansa, Punjab, India
- Spouse: Manjit Aulakh
- Writing career
- Genre: drama

Ajmer Singh Aulakh (19 August 1942 – 15 June 2017) was a renowned Punjabi playwright from Mansa district, Punjab. He was born in 1942 at Kumbharwal Kumbharwal, Sangrur district, Punjab, India.

== Books and plays ==
Aulakh published his first collection of one-act plays, Arbad narbad dhundukara (English: 'Eons and Nebulae') in 1978.

=== Collections of one-act plays ===
- Arbad narbad dhundukara (Eons and Nebulae)
- Begane bohar di chhan (Shade of the Alien Banyan)
- Anhe nishanchi (Blind Shooters)
- Gani

=== Plays ===
- Ik Ramayan hor (One More Ramayana)*Niuṃ-jaṛa
- Satt begaane
- Kehar Singh di maut (Kehar Singh's Death)
- Ishaka bājha namāza dā hajja nāhī
- Bhajian bahin (Broken Arms)
- Ikka sī dariā
- Jhanāṃ de pāṇī
- Aise jana wirale sam̆sāre

== Awards ==
He won the Sahitya Akademi Award in 2006 for his book Ishaka bājha namāza dā hajja nāhī (Plays).

== See also ==
- List of Sahitya Akademi Award winners for Punjabi
