= Darshan Buttar =

Punjabi poet

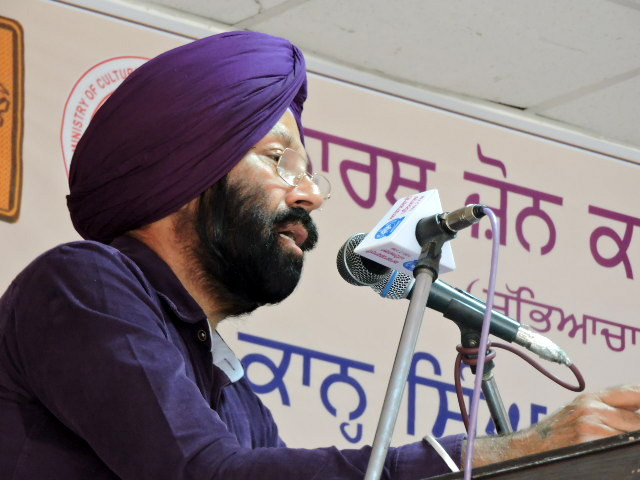
- Nabha Poetry Festival, 2016
- Born: 7 October 1954 (age 71); Nabha, Punjab Province, British India
- Citizenship: Indian
- Occupation: Novelist
- Writing career
- Language: Punjabi
- Notable works: Khaṛāwāṃ, Maha Kambani
- Notable awards: Sahitya Akademi Award (2013)

Darshan Buttar (born in Nabha, Punjab, India) is an Indian poet known for his short poems in Punjabi. His work is a part of the syllabus at the Punjabi University, Patiala.

== Books ==
- Maha Kambani (The Ultimate Trembling) (2009, 2018, 2024)
- Salaabi Hawa (Damp Wind) (1994)
- Shabad Shehar te Ret (Word, City and Dust) (1996, 1997, 1999, 2018)
- Aud de Baddal (The Dry Clouds). (1985)
- Khaṛāwāṃ (2001, 2002, 2018)
- "Aate de Diwe" (2016)

== Awards ==
He won the Sahitya Akademi Award in 2012 for his book Maha Kambani (The Ultimate Trembling).
