= Atamjit Singh =

- Occupations: Playwright; Theatre director
- Writing career
- Language: Punjabi
- Notable awards: Sahitya Akademi Award; Sangeet Natak Akademi Award
- Movement: Dakshinayan Abhiyan

Atamjit Singh is a Sahitya Akademi Award winning Punjabi playwright. He returned his Sahitya Akademi Award in October 2015. Singh is a part of the Dakshinayan Abhiyan.

== Books and plays ==
- Kabrastaan: A full length play
- Chabian: A collection of 5 short plays
- Hawa Mahal: A collection of 5 short plays
- Natak Natak Natak: A collection of 4short plays
- Rishtian Daa Kee Rakhiye Naa: A full length play
- Shahar Beemar Hai: A full length play
- Farsh Vich Uggia Rukh: A full length play
- Chirian: A collection of 3 short plays
- Puran: A full length play
- Kamloops Diaan Machhian: A full length play
- Mein Taan Ikk Saarangi Haan: A full length play
- Panch Nad Da Pani: A full length play
- Tatti Tawi Da Sach: A full length Punjabi play
- Mungu Comrade: A full length play
- Murh Aa Lama ToN: A full length play
- Ghadar Express: A full length play
- Tasveer Da Teeja Paasa: A full length play
- Eh Mahabharat da Yug Nahi: A full length play
- Guachi Nadi Da Geet: A full length play
- Balde Rahan Chiragh Hamesha: A full length play

== Awards ==
Singh won the Sahitya Akademi Award in 2009 for Tatti Tavi Da Sach (Play) and the Sangeet Natak Akademi Award in 2011.
