= List of Sahitya Akademi Award winners for Maithili =

List of winners of a literary honor in India

Sahitya Akademi Award for Maithili
- Award for contributions to Maithili literature
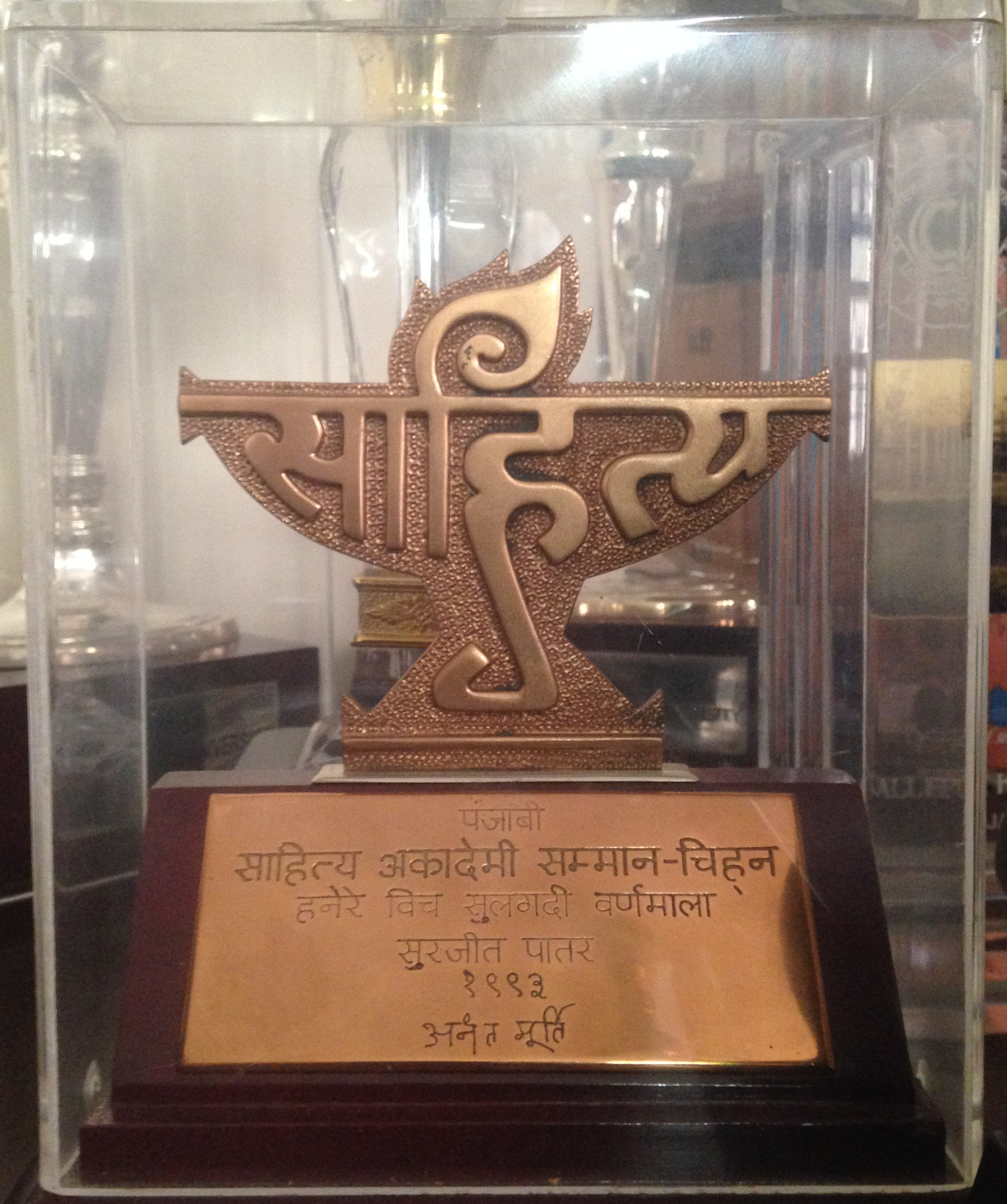
- Awarded for: Literary award in India
- Sponsored by: Sahitya Akademi, Government of India
- Reward: ₹1 lakh (US$1,100)
- First award: 1966
- Final award: 2024

Highlights
- Total awarded: 56
- First winner: Yashodhar Jha
- Most Recent winner: Mahendra Malangia
- Website: Official website

Part of a series on

Sahitya Akademi Awards
Category
Sahitya Akademi Award winners by language
- Assamese
- Bengali
- Bodo
- Dogri
- English
- Gujarati
- Hindi
- Kannada
- Kashmiri
- Konkani
- Maithili
- Malayalam
- Marathi
- Meitei (Manipuri)
- Nepali
- Odia
- Punjabi
- Rajasthani
- Sanskrit
- Santali
- Sindhi
- Tamil
- Telugu
- Urdu
Sahitya Akademi Translation Prizes
- Assamese
- Bengali
- Bodo
- Dogri
- English
- Gujarati
- Hindi
- Kannada
- Kashmiri
- Konkani
- Maithili
- Malayalam
- Marathi
- Meitei (Manipuri)
- Nepali
- Odia
- Punjabi
- Rajasthani
- Sanskrit
- Santali
- Sindhi
- Tamil
- Telugu
- Urdu
Sahitya Akademi Yuva Puraskar
- Assamese
- Bengali
- Bodo
- Dogri
- English
- Gujarati
- Hindi
- Kannada
- Kashmiri
- Konkani
- Maithili
- Malayalam
- Meitei (Manipuri)
- Marathi
- Nepali
- Odia
- Punjabi
- Rajasthani
- Sanskrit
- Santali
- Sindhi
- Tamil
- Telugu
- Urdu
Sahitya Akademi Bal Sahitya Puraskar
- Assamese
- Bengali
- Bodo
- Dogri
- English
- Gujarati
- Hindi
- Kannada
- Kashmiri
- Konkani
- Maithili
- Malayalam
- Meitei (Manipuri)
- Marathi
- Nepali
- Odia
- Punjabi
- Rajasthani
- Sanskrit
- Santali
- Sindhi
- Tamil
- Telugu
- Urdu
Related
- Eighth Schedule to the Constitution of India
- Official Languages Commission
- List of languages by number of native speakers in India

Sahitya Akademi Award is a literary honour given to Maithili language writers by Sahitya Akademi. No Awards were conferred in 1957, 1959, 1966 and 1972.

== Recipients ==
Year	Title	Author	
2025	Dhatri Paat San Gaam	Mahendra	Memoir
2024	Prabandh Sangrah	Mahendra Malangia	Essays
2023	Bodha Sanketan	Basukinath Jha	Essays
2022	Pen-Drive Me Prithvi	Ajit Azad	Poetry
2021	Pangu	Jagdish Prasad Mandal	Novel
2020	Gacch Roosai Acchi	Kamalkanth Jha	Short stories
2019	Jingik Oriaon Karait	Kumar Manish Arvind	Poetry
2018	Parineeta	Bina Thakur	Short Story
2017	Jahalak Diary	Uday Narayan Singh "Nachiketa"	Poetry
2016	Barki Kaki at hotmail dot com	Shyam Darihare	Short Stories
2015	Khissa	Man Mohan Jha	Short Stories
2014	Uchat	Asha Mishra	Novel
2013	Sangharsh Aa Sehanta	Sureshwar Jha	Memoirs
2012	Kist-Kist Jeewan	Shefalika Verma	Autobiography
2011	Apaksha	Uday Chandra Jha ‘Vinod’	Poetry
2010	Bhamati	Usha Kiran Khan	Novel
2009	Ganga-Putra	Man Mohan Jha	Short Stories
2008	Katek Daaripar	Mantreshwar Jha	Memoirs
2007	Sarokar	Pradip Bihari	Short Stories
2006	Kaath	Bibhuti Anand	Short Story
2005	Chanan Ghan Gachchiya	Vivekanand Thakur	Poetry
2004	Shakuntala	Chandrabhanu Singh	Epic
2003	Ritambhara	Niraja Renu (Khamakhy A Devi)	Short Stories
2002	Sahasmukhi Chowk Par	Somdev	Poetry
2001	Pratijna Pandav	Babuajee Jha ‘Ajnat’	Epic
2000	Katek Raas Baat	Ramanand Renu	Poetry
1999	Gananayak	Saketanand	Short Stories
1998	Takait Achhi Chirai	Jeeva Kant	Poetry
1997	Dhwast Hoet Shanti Stoop	Keerti Narayan Mishra	Poetry
1996	Aai Kaalhi Parsoo	Raj Mohan Jha	Short stories
1995	Kavita Kusumanjali	Jayamanta Mishra	Poetry
1994	Uchitavakta	Gangesh Gunjan	Short stories
1993	Samak Pauti	Govinda Jha	Short stories
1992	Vividha	Bhimanath Jha	Essays
1991	Pasijhaita Pathar	Ramdeo Jha	Play
1990	Prabhasak Katha	Prabhas kumar choudhary	Short stories
1989	Parasar	Kanchinath Jha ‘Kiran’	Epic
1988	Mantraputra	Mayanand Mishra	Novel
1987	Atita	Umanath Jha	Short stories
1986	Natik Patrak Uttar	Subhadra Jha	Belles-lettres
1985	Jeevan Yatra	Hari Mohan Jha	Autobiography
1984	Suryamukhi	Arsi Prasad Singh	Poetry
1983	Maithili Patrakaritaka Ithihas	Chandranath Mishra ‘Amar’	Treatise
1982	Marichika	Lily Ray	Novel
1981	Agastyayaini	Markandeya Pravasi	Epic
1980	Ee Bataha Sansar	Sudhanshu Shekhar Chaudhary	Novel
1979	Krishna-charit	Tantranath Jha	Poetry
1978	Baji Uthal Murali	Upendra Thakur ‘Mohan’	Poetry
1977	Avahatta: Udbhava O Vikas	Rajeshwar Jha	Literary criticism
1976	Sitayana	Vaidyanath Mallik "Vidhu"	Epic
1975	Kichhu Dekhal Kichhu Sunal	Girindramohan Mishra	Reminiscences
1973	Naika Banijara	Braj Kishore Verma ‘Manipadma’	Novel
1971	Payasvini	Surenda Jha ‘Suman’	Poetry
1970	Radha Viraha	Kashikant Mishra ‘Madhup’	Epic poetry
1969	Du Patra	Upendranth Jha	Novel
1968	Patrahin Nagna Gachh	Yatri(Vaidyanath Mishra)	Poetry
1966	Mithila-Baibhav	Yashodhar Jha	Philosophical treatise
