= List of Sahitya Akademi Award winners for Nepali =

List of winners of a literary honor in India

Sahitya Akademi Award for Nepali
- Award for contributions to Nepali literature
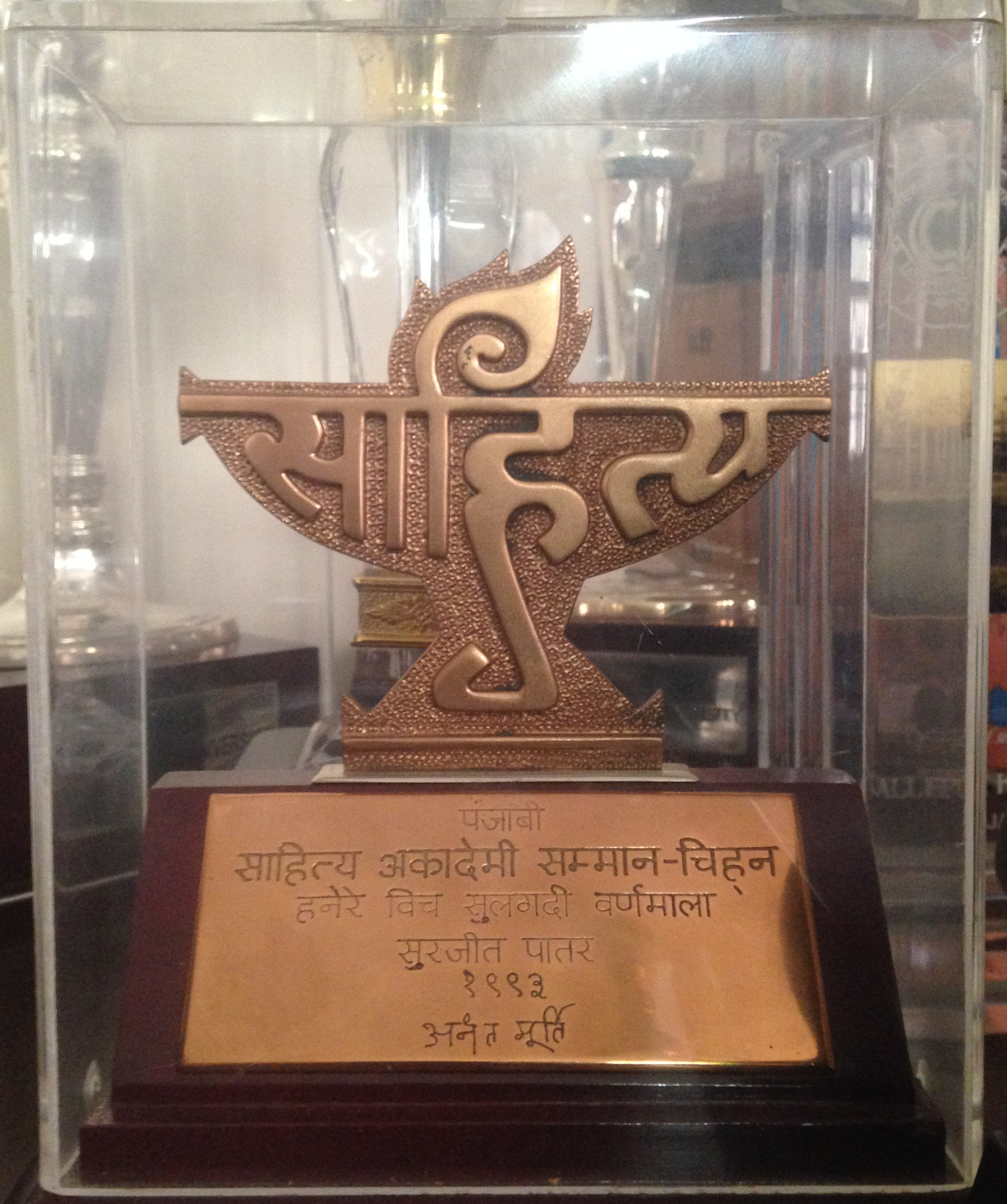
- Awarded for: Literary award in India
- Sponsored by: Sahitya Akademi, Government of India
- Reward: ₹1 lakh (US$1,100)
- First award: 1977
- Final award: 2024

Highlights
- Total awarded: 47
- First winner: Indra Bahadur Rai
- Most Recent winner: Yuva Baral
- Website: Official website

Part of a series on

Sahitya Akademi Awards
Category
Sahitya Akademi Award winners by language
- Assamese
- Bengali
- Bodo
- Dogri
- English
- Gujarati
- Hindi
- Kannada
- Kashmiri
- Konkani
- Maithili
- Malayalam
- Marathi
- Meitei (Manipuri)
- Nepali
- Odia
- Punjabi
- Rajasthani
- Sanskrit
- Santali
- Sindhi
- Tamil
- Telugu
- Urdu
Sahitya Akademi Translation Prizes
- Assamese
- Bengali
- Bodo
- Dogri
- English
- Gujarati
- Hindi
- Kannada
- Kashmiri
- Konkani
- Maithili
- Malayalam
- Marathi
- Meitei (Manipuri)
- Nepali
- Odia
- Punjabi
- Rajasthani
- Sanskrit
- Santali
- Sindhi
- Tamil
- Telugu
- Urdu
Sahitya Akademi Yuva Puraskar
- Assamese
- Bengali
- Bodo
- Dogri
- English
- Gujarati
- Hindi
- Kannada
- Kashmiri
- Konkani
- Maithili
- Malayalam
- Meitei (Manipuri)
- Marathi
- Nepali
- Odia
- Punjabi
- Rajasthani
- Sanskrit
- Santali
- Sindhi
- Tamil
- Telugu
- Urdu
Sahitya Akademi Bal Sahitya Puraskar
- Assamese
- Bengali
- Bodo
- Dogri
- English
- Gujarati
- Hindi
- Kannada
- Kashmiri
- Konkani
- Maithili
- Malayalam
- Meitei (Manipuri)
- Marathi
- Nepali
- Odia
- Punjabi
- Rajasthani
- Sanskrit
- Santali
- Sindhi
- Tamil
- Telugu
- Urdu
Related
- Eighth Schedule to the Constitution of India
- Official Languages Commission
- List of languages by number of native speakers in India

Sahitya Akademi Award is a literary honour given each year by the Sahitya Akademi (India's National Academy of Letters) to writers and their works for their outstanding contribution to the upliftment of Indian literature, Nepali literature being one of them.

== Winners ==
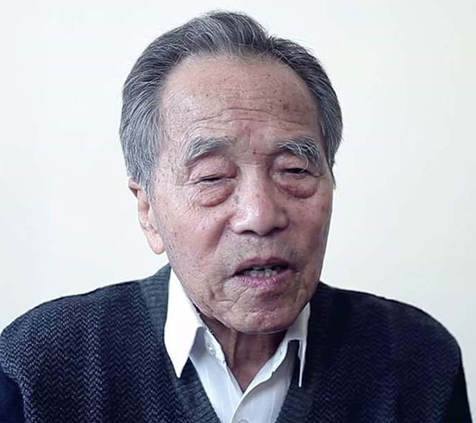
Indra Bahadur Rai was the first winner of this award.

Year	Author	Work	Type of Work
1977	Indra Bahadur Rai	Nepali Upanyaska Adharharu	Literary criticism
1978	Shiva Kumar Rai	Khahare	Short stories
1979	Guman Singh Chamling	Maulo	Essays
1980	Okima Gwyn	Sunakhari	Novel
1981	Asit Rai	Naya Kshitijko Khoj	Novel
1982	M. M. Gurung	Binsiyako Sanskriti	Essays
1983	Indra Sundas	Niyati	Novel
1984	Ramchandra Giri	Samaj Darpan	Epic
1985	Matsyendra Pradhan	Neelkantha	Novel
1986	Sharad Chhetri	Chakrabyuha	Short stories
1987	Lil Bahadur Chettri	Brahmaputraka Chheu-Chhau	Novel
1988	Pushpalal Upadhyaya	Usha Manjari	Poetry
1989	Tulsi Bahadur Chhetri	Karna-Kunti	Epic
1990	Tulsiram Sharma Kashyap	Aama	Poetry
1991	Girmee Sherpa	Hypocret Champ-Gurans Ra Anya Kavita	Poetry
1992	R. P. Lama	Indra Dhanush	Essays
1993	Gadul Singh Lama	Mrigatrishna	Short stories
1994	Jiwan Namdung	Paryavekshan	Essays
1995	Nagendramani Pradhan	Dr. Parasmani Ko Jiwan Yatra	Biography
1996	Mohan Thakuri	Nihshabda	Poetry
1997	Mani Prasad Rai	Veer Jatiko Amar Kahani	Biographical essays
1998	Man Prasad Subba	Adim Basti	Poetry
1999	Bikram Bir Thapa	Bishaun Shatabdi Ki Monalisa	Short stories
2000	Ramlal Adhikari	Nisansmaran	Essays
2001	Lakhi Devi Sundas	Ahat Anubhuti	Short stories
2002	Prem Pradhan	Udasin Rukhaharu	Novel
2003	Bindya Subba	Athah	Novel
2004	Jas Yonjan ‘Pyasi’	Shanti Sandeha	Poetry
2005	Krishna Singh Moktan	Jiwan Goreto Ma	Novel
2006	Bhim Dahal	Droha	Novel
2007	Lakshman Srimal	Curfew	Plays
2008	Haiman Dad Rai ‘Kirat’	Kehi Namileka Rekhaharu	Short stories
2009	Samiran Chhetri ‘Priyadarshi’	Gairigaonki Chameli	Short stories
2010	Gopi Narayan Pradhan	Akashlay Pani Thawan Khoji Rahechha	Poetry
2011	No Award		
2012	Uday Thulung	Ekantavas	Short stories
2013	Man Bahadur Pradhan	Manka Lahar Ra Raharharu	Travelogues
2014	Nanda Hangkhim	Satta Grahan	Short stories
2015	Gupta Pradhan	Samayaka Pratibimbaharu	Short stories
2016	Gita Upadhyay	Janmabhumi Mero Swadesh	Novel
2017	Bina Hangkhim	Kriti Vimarsh	Literary criticism
2018	Loknath Upadhyay Chapagain	Kino Royeu Upama	Short stories
2019	Salon Karthak	Biswa Euta Pallo Gaon	Travelogue
2020	Shankar Dev Dhakal	Kirayako kokh	novel
2021	Chabilal Upadhyay	Usha Anniruddha	Epic poetry
2022	K. B. Nepali	Saino	Drama
2023	Judhabir Rana	Nepali Loksahitya Ra Loksanskritiko Parichaya	Essays
2024	Yuva Baral	Chhichimira	Short Stories
2025	Prakash Bhattarai	Nepali Paramparik Sanskriti Ra Sabhyata KoDukuti	Essays
