= List of Yuva Puraskar winners for Marathi =

List of winners of a literary honor in India

Part of a series on

Sahitya Akademi Awards
Category
Sahitya Akademi Award winners by language
- Assamese
- Bengali
- Bodo
- Dogri
- English
- Gujarati
- Hindi
- Kannada
- Kashmiri
- Konkani
- Maithili
- Malayalam
- Marathi
- Meitei (Manipuri)
- Nepali
- Odia
- Punjabi
- Rajasthani
- Sanskrit
- Santali
- Sindhi
- Tamil
- Telugu
- Urdu
Sahitya Akademi Translation Prizes
- Assamese
- Bengali
- Bodo
- Dogri
- English
- Gujarati
- Hindi
- Kannada
- Kashmiri
- Konkani
- Maithili
- Malayalam
- Marathi
- Meitei (Manipuri)
- Nepali
- Odia
- Punjabi
- Rajasthani
- Sanskrit
- Santali
- Sindhi
- Tamil
- Telugu
- Urdu
Sahitya Akademi Yuva Puraskar
- Assamese
- Bengali
- Bodo
- Dogri
- English
- Gujarati
- Hindi
- Kannada
- Kashmiri
- Konkani
- Maithili
- Malayalam
- Meitei (Manipuri)
- Marathi
- Nepali
- Odia
- Punjabi
- Rajasthani
- Sanskrit
- Santali
- Sindhi
- Tamil
- Telugu
- Urdu
Sahitya Akademi Bal Sahitya Puraskar
- Assamese
- Bengali
- Bodo
- Dogri
- English
- Gujarati
- Hindi
- Kannada
- Kashmiri
- Konkani
- Maithili
- Malayalam
- Meitei (Manipuri)
- Marathi
- Nepali
- Odia
- Punjabi
- Rajasthani
- Sanskrit
- Santali
- Sindhi
- Tamil
- Telugu
- Urdu
Related
- Eighth Schedule to the Constitution of India
- Official Languages Commission
- List of languages by number of native speakers in India

Yuva Puraskar is given each year to young writers for their outstanding works in the 24 languages, since 2011.

== Recipients ==
Following is the list of recipients of Yuva Puraskar for their works written in Marathi. The award comprises a cash prize of Rs. 50,000 and an engraved copper plaque.

Year	Author	Work	Genre	References
2011	Aishwarya Patekar	Bhuishastra	Poetry	
2012	Dharmakirti Sumant	Pani - Charo, Aaro Ityadi...	Play	
2013	Ravi Korde	Dhoosar Zale Nasate Gav	Poetry	
2014	Avadhoot Dongre	Svatahala Faltu Samajnyachi Goshta	Novel	
2015	Veera Rathod	Sen Saai Ves	Poetry	
2016	Manaswani Lata Ravindra	Blogchya Aarshapalyad	Short Stories	
2017	Rahul Kosambi	Ubha – Aadava	Essays	
2018	Navnath Gore	Fesati	Novel	
2019	Sushil Kumar Shinde	Shahar Atmahatya Karaycha Mhantay	Poetry	
2020	Prajakt Deshmukh	Devbabhli	Play	
2021	Pranav Sakhadeo	Kale Karde Strokes	Novel	
2022	Pawan Nalat	Mi sandarbh pokhartoy	Poetry	
2023	Vishakha Vishwanath	Swatahala Swataviruddh Ubhe Kartana	Poetry	
2024	Devidas Saudagar	Usvan	Novel	
2025	Pradeep Kokare	Khol Khol Dushkal Dole	Novel	

== See also ==
- List of Sahitya Akademi Award winners for Marathi
- List of Sahitya Akademi Translation Prize winners for Marathi
