= List of Bal Sahitya Puraskar winners for Meitei =

Winners of a literary honour in India

Part of a series on

Sahitya Akademi Awards
Category
Sahitya Akademi Award winners by language
- Assamese
- Bengali
- Bodo
- Dogri
- English
- Gujarati
- Hindi
- Kannada
- Kashmiri
- Konkani
- Maithili
- Malayalam
- Marathi
- Meitei (Manipuri)
- Nepali
- Odia
- Punjabi
- Rajasthani
- Sanskrit
- Santali
- Sindhi
- Tamil
- Telugu
- Urdu
Sahitya Akademi Translation Prizes
- Assamese
- Bengali
- Bodo
- Dogri
- English
- Gujarati
- Hindi
- Kannada
- Kashmiri
- Konkani
- Maithili
- Malayalam
- Marathi
- Meitei (Manipuri)
- Nepali
- Odia
- Punjabi
- Rajasthani
- Sanskrit
- Santali
- Sindhi
- Tamil
- Telugu
- Urdu
Sahitya Akademi Yuva Puraskar
- Assamese
- Bengali
- Bodo
- Dogri
- English
- Gujarati
- Hindi
- Kannada
- Kashmiri
- Konkani
- Maithili
- Malayalam
- Meitei (Manipuri)
- Marathi
- Nepali
- Odia
- Punjabi
- Rajasthani
- Sanskrit
- Santali
- Sindhi
- Tamil
- Telugu
- Urdu
Sahitya Akademi Bal Sahitya Puraskar
- Assamese
- Bengali
- Bodo
- Dogri
- English
- Gujarati
- Hindi
- Kannada
- Kashmiri
- Konkani
- Maithili
- Malayalam
- Meitei (Manipuri)
- Marathi
- Nepali
- Odia
- Punjabi
- Rajasthani
- Sanskrit
- Santali
- Sindhi
- Tamil
- Telugu
- Urdu
Related
- Eighth Schedule to the Constitution of India
- Official Languages Commission
- List of languages by number of native speakers in India

Bal Sahitya Puraskar (transl. Children's literature award) is given each year to writers for their outstanding works in children's literature in Meitei language (officially called Manipuri language), since 2010.

== Recipients ==
Following is the list of recipients of Bal Sahitya Puraskar for their works written in Meitei (Manipuri). The award comprises a cash prize of Rs. 50,000 and an engraved copper plaque.

Year	Author	Work	Genre	References
2010	Ngathem Ningol Kongbam O. Ibeyaima Devi	Sorarengi Machanupi Atonbi Leimashang Amasung Atei Phunga Warising	Folk Tales	
2011	K. Shantibala Devi	Tal Taret	Folk Tales & Plays	
2012	Sagolsem Indrakumar Singh	Thada Thabaton	Science Fiction	
2013	Raghu Leishangthem	Patpangi Thoibi	Stories	
2014	Rajkumar Bhubonsana	Sana Kokchao Amasung Bhut Ningthou	Stories	
2015	Thokchom Thouyangba Meitei	Eshusha Pupu Waree Leerage	Stories	
2016	No Award			
2017	Wareppam Jugindra Singh	Angangi Wari Macha Niphu	Short Stories	
2018	Khangembam Shamungou	Mahousha Lairembigee Mashaigonda Thirushi Lao Yenglushi Lao	Poetry	
2019	R. K. Sanahanbi Chanu	Thawaishinggi Thawai	Play	
2020	Naorem Bidyasagar	Uchan Meira	Poetry	
2021	Ningombam Jadumani Singh	Apunbana Pangalni	Collection of Plays	
2022	Naorem Lokeshwore Singh	Tomthin Amsung Khuji	Short Stories	
2023	Dilip Nongmaithem	Ibemma Amasung Ngabemma	Children's stories	
2024	Kshetrimayum Subadani	Malem Atiya	Novel	
2025	Shanto M	Anganganginage Shamahungsida	Play	

== See also ==
- List of Sahitya Akademi Award winners for Meitei
- List of Sahitya Akademi Translation Prize winners for Meitei
- List of Yuva Puraskar winners for Meitei
