= List of Yuva Puraskar winners for Sindhi =

List of winners of a literary honor in India

Part of a series on

Sahitya Akademi Awards
Category
Sahitya Akademi Award winners by language
- Assamese
- Bengali
- Bodo
- Dogri
- English
- Gujarati
- Hindi
- Kannada
- Kashmiri
- Konkani
- Maithili
- Malayalam
- Marathi
- Meitei (Manipuri)
- Nepali
- Odia
- Punjabi
- Rajasthani
- Sanskrit
- Santali
- Sindhi
- Tamil
- Telugu
- Urdu
Sahitya Akademi Translation Prizes
- Assamese
- Bengali
- Bodo
- Dogri
- English
- Gujarati
- Hindi
- Kannada
- Kashmiri
- Konkani
- Maithili
- Malayalam
- Marathi
- Meitei (Manipuri)
- Nepali
- Odia
- Punjabi
- Rajasthani
- Sanskrit
- Santali
- Sindhi
- Tamil
- Telugu
- Urdu
Sahitya Akademi Yuva Puraskar
- Assamese
- Bengali
- Bodo
- Dogri
- English
- Gujarati
- Hindi
- Kannada
- Kashmiri
- Konkani
- Maithili
- Malayalam
- Meitei (Manipuri)
- Marathi
- Nepali
- Odia
- Punjabi
- Rajasthani
- Sanskrit
- Santali
- Sindhi
- Tamil
- Telugu
- Urdu
Sahitya Akademi Bal Sahitya Puraskar
- Assamese
- Bengali
- Bodo
- Dogri
- English
- Gujarati
- Hindi
- Kannada
- Kashmiri
- Konkani
- Maithili
- Malayalam
- Meitei (Manipuri)
- Marathi
- Nepali
- Odia
- Punjabi
- Rajasthani
- Sanskrit
- Santali
- Sindhi
- Tamil
- Telugu
- Urdu
Related
- Eighth Schedule to the Constitution of India
- Official Languages Commission
- List of languages by number of native speakers in India

Yuva Puraskar is given each year to young writers for their outstanding works in the 24 languages, since 2011.

== Recipients ==
Following is the list of recipients of Yuva Puraskar for their works written in Sindhi. The award comprises a cash prize of Rs. 50,000 and an engraved copper plaque.

Year	Author	Work	Genre	References
2011	No Award			
2012	No Award			
2013	No Award			
2014	No Award			
2015	Manoj Chawla 'Tanha'	Pinjraa	Poetry	
2016	Bharti Sadarangani	Retilo Chitu	Poetry	
2017	Rekha Sachdev Pohani	Usaat	Poetry	
2018	Champa Chetnani	Sabla Nari	Play	
2019	Kiran Paryani ‘Anmol’	Anmol Rishta	Poetry	
2020	Komal Jagdish Dayalani	Kaash	Short Stories	
2021	Rakesh Shewani	Zlndagia Jaa Rang	Play	
2022	Heena Aswani	Sindhiyat Jee Surhanni	Poetry	
2023	Monika J. Panjwani	Glamour	Short Stories	
2024	Geeta Pradeep Rupani	Paper Parya	Articles	
2025	Manthan Bachani	Pandhiyado	Poetry	

== See also ==
- List of Sahitya Akademi Award winners for Sindhi
- List of Sahitya Akademi Translation Prize winners for Sindhi
