= List of Yuva Puraskar winners for Konkani =

List of winners of a literary honor in India

Part of a series on

Sahitya Akademi Awards
Category
Sahitya Akademi Award winners by language
- Assamese
- Bengali
- Bodo
- Dogri
- English
- Gujarati
- Hindi
- Kannada
- Kashmiri
- Konkani
- Maithili
- Malayalam
- Marathi
- Meitei (Manipuri)
- Nepali
- Odia
- Punjabi
- Rajasthani
- Sanskrit
- Santali
- Sindhi
- Tamil
- Telugu
- Urdu
Sahitya Akademi Translation Prizes
- Assamese
- Bengali
- Bodo
- Dogri
- English
- Gujarati
- Hindi
- Kannada
- Kashmiri
- Konkani
- Maithili
- Malayalam
- Marathi
- Meitei (Manipuri)
- Nepali
- Odia
- Punjabi
- Rajasthani
- Sanskrit
- Santali
- Sindhi
- Tamil
- Telugu
- Urdu
Sahitya Akademi Yuva Puraskar
- Assamese
- Bengali
- Bodo
- Dogri
- English
- Gujarati
- Hindi
- Kannada
- Kashmiri
- Konkani
- Maithili
- Malayalam
- Meitei (Manipuri)
- Marathi
- Nepali
- Odia
- Punjabi
- Rajasthani
- Sanskrit
- Santali
- Sindhi
- Tamil
- Telugu
- Urdu
Sahitya Akademi Bal Sahitya Puraskar
- Assamese
- Bengali
- Bodo
- Dogri
- English
- Gujarati
- Hindi
- Kannada
- Kashmiri
- Konkani
- Maithili
- Malayalam
- Meitei (Manipuri)
- Marathi
- Nepali
- Odia
- Punjabi
- Rajasthani
- Sanskrit
- Santali
- Sindhi
- Tamil
- Telugu
- Urdu
Related
- Eighth Schedule to the Constitution of India
- Official Languages Commission
- List of languages by number of native speakers in India

Yuva Puraskar is given each year to young writers for their outstanding works in the 24 languages, since 2011.

== Recipients ==
Following is the list of recipients of Yuva Puraskar for their works written in Konkani. The award comprises a cash prize of Rs. 50,000 and an engraved copper plaque.

Year	Author	Work	Genre	References
2011	Jofa Gonsalves	Nirnay	Short Story	
2012	Naman Dhawasker Sawant	Muktamann	Essays	
2013	Yogini Borkar	Matyentle Gandh	Poetry	
2014	Naresh Chandra Naik	Gauman	Short Story	
2015	Shrinisha Nayak	Khany Geli Aaji	Poetry	
2016	Anwesha Singbal	Sulus	Poetry	
2017	Amey Vishram Naik	Mog Dot Com	Poetry	
2018	Vilma Bantwal	Mukhaddin	Poetry	
2019	Hemant Aiya	Kathaakar	Short Story	
2020	Sampada Shenvi Kunkoliekar	Char Panvala Ashiyent	Travelogue	
2021	Shraddha Garad	Kavya Parmal	Poetry	
2022	Fr. Myron Jeson Barreto	Tallo-The Voice	Essays	
2023	Tanvi Kamat Bambolkar	Shots	Short Stories	
2024	Adwait Salgaonkar	Pedanyacha Samaaram	Essays	
2025	Glynis Dias	Gaavgaathaa	Short Stories	

== See also ==
- List of Sahitya Akademi Award winners for Konkani
- List of Sahitya Akademi Translation Prize winners for Konkani
