= List of Yuva Puraskar winners for Dogri =

List of winners of a literary honor in India

Part of a series on

Sahitya Akademi Awards
Category
Sahitya Akademi Award winners by language
- Assamese
- Bengali
- Bodo
- Dogri
- English
- Gujarati
- Hindi
- Kannada
- Kashmiri
- Konkani
- Maithili
- Malayalam
- Marathi
- Meitei (Manipuri)
- Nepali
- Odia
- Punjabi
- Rajasthani
- Sanskrit
- Santali
- Sindhi
- Tamil
- Telugu
- Urdu
Sahitya Akademi Translation Prizes
- Assamese
- Bengali
- Bodo
- Dogri
- English
- Gujarati
- Hindi
- Kannada
- Kashmiri
- Konkani
- Maithili
- Malayalam
- Marathi
- Meitei (Manipuri)
- Nepali
- Odia
- Punjabi
- Rajasthani
- Sanskrit
- Santali
- Sindhi
- Tamil
- Telugu
- Urdu
Sahitya Akademi Yuva Puraskar
- Assamese
- Bengali
- Bodo
- Dogri
- English
- Gujarati
- Hindi
- Kannada
- Kashmiri
- Konkani
- Maithili
- Malayalam
- Meitei (Manipuri)
- Marathi
- Nepali
- Odia
- Punjabi
- Rajasthani
- Sanskrit
- Santali
- Sindhi
- Tamil
- Telugu
- Urdu
Sahitya Akademi Bal Sahitya Puraskar
- Assamese
- Bengali
- Bodo
- Dogri
- English
- Gujarati
- Hindi
- Kannada
- Kashmiri
- Konkani
- Maithili
- Malayalam
- Meitei (Manipuri)
- Marathi
- Nepali
- Odia
- Punjabi
- Rajasthani
- Sanskrit
- Santali
- Sindhi
- Tamil
- Telugu
- Urdu
Related
- Eighth Schedule to the Constitution of India
- Official Languages Commission
- List of languages by number of native speakers in India

Yuva Puraskar is given each year to young writers for their outstanding works in the 24 languages, since 2011.

== Recipients ==
Following is the list of recipients of Yuva Puraskar for their works written in Dogri. The award comprises a cash prize of Rs. 50,000 and an engraved copper plaque.

Year	Author	Work	Genre	References
2011	No Award			
2012	Yash Raina	Do Kandhe	Poetry	
2013	Dheeraj Kesar 'Nikka'	Rough Copy	Poetry	
2014	No Award			
2015	Sandeep 'Sufi'	Mustakbil	Poetry	
2016	Brham Dutt Magotra	Kule Bhav	Poetry	
2017	Rajinder Ranjha	Tere Hirke Ch	Poetry	
2018	No Award			
2019	Sunil Kumar	Sees	Short Stories	
2020	Ganga Sharma	Manne Da Buaal	Poetry	
2021	Arun Akash Dev	Phang Honsele De	Poetry	
2022	Ashu Sharma	Kathputali	Short Stories	
2023	Dheeraj Bismil	Ahlada	Plays	
2024	Heena Choudhary	Ik Rang Tere Range Chaa	Poetry	
2025	No Award			

== See also ==
- List of Sahitya Akademi Award winners for Dogri
- List of Sahitya Akademi Translation Prize winners for Dogri
