= List of Bal Sahitya Puraskar winners for Bodo =

Winners of a literary honour in India

Part of a series on

Sahitya Akademi Awards
Category
Sahitya Akademi Award winners by language
- Assamese
- Bengali
- Bodo
- Dogri
- English
- Gujarati
- Hindi
- Kannada
- Kashmiri
- Konkani
- Maithili
- Malayalam
- Marathi
- Meitei (Manipuri)
- Nepali
- Odia
- Punjabi
- Rajasthani
- Sanskrit
- Santali
- Sindhi
- Tamil
- Telugu
- Urdu
Sahitya Akademi Translation Prizes
- Assamese
- Bengali
- Bodo
- Dogri
- English
- Gujarati
- Hindi
- Kannada
- Kashmiri
- Konkani
- Maithili
- Malayalam
- Marathi
- Meitei (Manipuri)
- Nepali
- Odia
- Punjabi
- Rajasthani
- Sanskrit
- Santali
- Sindhi
- Tamil
- Telugu
- Urdu
Sahitya Akademi Yuva Puraskar
- Assamese
- Bengali
- Bodo
- Dogri
- English
- Gujarati
- Hindi
- Kannada
- Kashmiri
- Konkani
- Maithili
- Malayalam
- Meitei (Manipuri)
- Marathi
- Nepali
- Odia
- Punjabi
- Rajasthani
- Sanskrit
- Santali
- Sindhi
- Tamil
- Telugu
- Urdu
Sahitya Akademi Bal Sahitya Puraskar
- Assamese
- Bengali
- Bodo
- Dogri
- English
- Gujarati
- Hindi
- Kannada
- Kashmiri
- Konkani
- Maithili
- Malayalam
- Meitei (Manipuri)
- Marathi
- Nepali
- Odia
- Punjabi
- Rajasthani
- Sanskrit
- Santali
- Sindhi
- Tamil
- Telugu
- Urdu
Related
- Eighth Schedule to the Constitution of India
- Official Languages Commission
- List of languages by number of native speakers in India

Bal Sahitya Puraskar is given each year to writers for their outstanding works in the 24 languages, since 2010.

== Recipients ==
Following is the list of recipients of Bal Sahitya Puraskar for their works written in Bodo. The award comprises a cash prize of Rs. 50,000 and an engraved copper plaque.

Year	Author	Work	Genre	References
2010	Nabin Malla Boro	Chitrakutni Frai - Mount Abu	Travelogue	
2011	Maheswar Narzary	Puranni Solo Phithikha (in 2 vols.)	Short Stories	
2012	Haricharan Boro	Okhrangma Isingao	Essays	
2013	Jatindra Nath Swargiary	Birbalni Solo	Stories	
2014	Kaushalya Brahma	Gothosaforni Rao	Poetry	
2015	Tiren Boro	Bokhali	Novel	
2016	NO AWARD			
2017	Renu Boro	Total Contribution to Children's Literature		
2018	Sitaram Basumatary	Gotho Gothaini Solo Bhata	Short Stories	
2019	Lakhminath Brahma	Solobatha Khwnasong De	Folk Tales	
2020	Ajit Boro	Gothosa Bisombi	Essays	
2021	Ratneswar Narzary	Dikhura Solobatha	Folk Tales	
2022	Rajeshwar Singh ‘Raju’	Sikh-Mat	Short Stories	
2023	Pratima Nandi Narzaree	Gosaini Gwjwn Nwjwr	Short Stories	
2024	Virgin Jekova Machahary	Buhuma Boynibw	Poetry	
2025	Binay Kumar Brahma	Khanthi Boronn Ang Abhu Duhui	Stories	

== See also ==
- List of Sahitya Akademi Award winners for Bodo
