= List of Bal Sahitya Puraskar winners for Punjabi =

Winners of a literary honour in India

Part of a series on

Sahitya Akademi Awards
Category
Sahitya Akademi Award winners by language
- Assamese
- Bengali
- Bodo
- Dogri
- English
- Gujarati
- Hindi
- Kannada
- Kashmiri
- Konkani
- Maithili
- Malayalam
- Marathi
- Meitei (Manipuri)
- Nepali
- Odia
- Punjabi
- Rajasthani
- Sanskrit
- Santali
- Sindhi
- Tamil
- Telugu
- Urdu
Sahitya Akademi Translation Prizes
- Assamese
- Bengali
- Bodo
- Dogri
- English
- Gujarati
- Hindi
- Kannada
- Kashmiri
- Konkani
- Maithili
- Malayalam
- Marathi
- Meitei (Manipuri)
- Nepali
- Odia
- Punjabi
- Rajasthani
- Sanskrit
- Santali
- Sindhi
- Tamil
- Telugu
- Urdu
Sahitya Akademi Yuva Puraskar
- Assamese
- Bengali
- Bodo
- Dogri
- English
- Gujarati
- Hindi
- Kannada
- Kashmiri
- Konkani
- Maithili
- Malayalam
- Meitei (Manipuri)
- Marathi
- Nepali
- Odia
- Punjabi
- Rajasthani
- Sanskrit
- Santali
- Sindhi
- Tamil
- Telugu
- Urdu
Sahitya Akademi Bal Sahitya Puraskar
- Assamese
- Bengali
- Bodo
- Dogri
- English
- Gujarati
- Hindi
- Kannada
- Kashmiri
- Konkani
- Maithili
- Malayalam
- Meitei (Manipuri)
- Marathi
- Nepali
- Odia
- Punjabi
- Rajasthani
- Sanskrit
- Santali
- Sindhi
- Tamil
- Telugu
- Urdu
Related
- Eighth Schedule to the Constitution of India
- Official Languages Commission
- List of languages by number of native speakers in India

Bal Sahitya Puraskar is given each year to writers for their outstanding works in the 24 languages, since 2010.

== Recipients ==
Following is the list of recipients of Bal Sahitya Puraskar for their works written in Punjabi. The award comprises a cash prize of Rs. 50,000 and an engraved copper plaque.

Year	Author	Work	Genre	References
2010	Jasbir Bhullar	Patal De Githmuthie	Novel	
2011	Darshan Singh Aasht	Bujo Bachio Mai Han Kaun? (1-3 vols.)	Poetry	
2012	Manmohan Singh Daun	Total Contribution to Children's Literature		
2013	Kamaljit Neelon	Total Contribution to Children's Literature		
2014	Kulbir Singh Suri	Rajkumar Da Supna	Stories	
2015	Sukhdev Madpuri	Total Contribution to Children's Literature		
2016	Hriday Pal Singh	Total Contribution to Children's Literature		
2017	Satpal Bhikhi	Total Contribution to Children's Literature		
2018	Tarsem	Tahli Wali Gali	Novel	
2019	Pawan Harchandpuri	Aliens Di Dharti Te	Novel	
2020	Karnail Singh Somal	Phullan Da Shehar	Travelogue	
2021	No Awards			
2022	No Awards			
2023	Gurmeet Karyalvi	Sachi Di Kahani	Short Stories	
2024	Kuldeep Singh Deep	Mai Jalianwala Bagh Bolda Haan	Play	
2025	Pali Khadim	Jadoo Patta	Novel	

== See also ==
- List of Sahitya Akademi Award winners for Punjabi
