= List of Yuva Puraskar winners for Punjabi =

List of winners of a literary honor in India

Part of a series on

Sahitya Akademi Awards
Category
Sahitya Akademi Award winners by language
- Assamese
- Bengali
- Bodo
- Dogri
- English
- Gujarati
- Hindi
- Kannada
- Kashmiri
- Konkani
- Maithili
- Malayalam
- Marathi
- Meitei (Manipuri)
- Nepali
- Odia
- Punjabi
- Rajasthani
- Sanskrit
- Santali
- Sindhi
- Tamil
- Telugu
- Urdu
Sahitya Akademi Translation Prizes
- Assamese
- Bengali
- Bodo
- Dogri
- English
- Gujarati
- Hindi
- Kannada
- Kashmiri
- Konkani
- Maithili
- Malayalam
- Marathi
- Meitei (Manipuri)
- Nepali
- Odia
- Punjabi
- Rajasthani
- Sanskrit
- Santali
- Sindhi
- Tamil
- Telugu
- Urdu
Sahitya Akademi Yuva Puraskar
- Assamese
- Bengali
- Bodo
- Dogri
- English
- Gujarati
- Hindi
- Kannada
- Kashmiri
- Konkani
- Maithili
- Malayalam
- Meitei (Manipuri)
- Marathi
- Nepali
- Odia
- Punjabi
- Rajasthani
- Sanskrit
- Santali
- Sindhi
- Tamil
- Telugu
- Urdu
Sahitya Akademi Bal Sahitya Puraskar
- Assamese
- Bengali
- Bodo
- Dogri
- English
- Gujarati
- Hindi
- Kannada
- Kashmiri
- Konkani
- Maithili
- Malayalam
- Meitei (Manipuri)
- Marathi
- Nepali
- Odia
- Punjabi
- Rajasthani
- Sanskrit
- Santali
- Sindhi
- Tamil
- Telugu
- Urdu
Related
- Eighth Schedule to the Constitution of India
- Official Languages Commission
- List of languages by number of native speakers in India

Yuva Puraskar is given each year to young writers for their outstanding works in the 24 languages, since 2011.

== Recipients ==
Following is the list of recipients of Yuva Puraskar for their works written in Punjabi. The award comprises a cash prize of Rs. 50,000 and an engraved copper plaque.

Year	Author	Work	Genre
2011	Paramveer Singh	Amrit Vela	Poetry
2012	Pargat Singh Satauj	Teevian	Novel
2013	Harpreet Kaur	Toon Mainu Sirlekh De	Poetry
2014	Gagan Deep Sharma	Ikalla Nahin Hunda Banda	Poetry
2015	Simran Dhaliwal	Aas Aje Bani Hai	Short Stories
2016	Ranjit Saranwali	Pani Utte Meenakari	Poetry
2017	Harman	Rani Tatt	Poetry
2018	Gurpreet Sehji	Balora	Novel
2019	Yadwinder Singh Sandhu	Waqt Beeteya Nahi	Novel
2020	Deepak Kumar Dhalewan	Malaha'n Ton Bina	Poetry
2021	Veerdavlnder Singh	Paa De Pailaan	Essays
2022	Sandhu Gagan	Panjteele	Poetry
2023	Sandeep	Chitt Da Jugraphia	Poetry
2024	Randhir	Khat Jo Likhno Reh Gaye	Poetry
2025	Mandeep Aulakh	Girls Hostel	Poetry

== See also ==
- List of Sahitya Akademi Award winners for Punjabi
- List of Sahitya Akademi Translation Prize winners for Punjabi
