= List of Yuva Puraskar winners for Tamil =

List of winners of a literary honor in India

Part of a series on

Sahitya Akademi Awards
Category
Sahitya Akademi Award winners by language
- Assamese
- Bengali
- Bodo
- Dogri
- English
- Gujarati
- Hindi
- Kannada
- Kashmiri
- Konkani
- Maithili
- Malayalam
- Marathi
- Meitei (Manipuri)
- Nepali
- Odia
- Punjabi
- Rajasthani
- Sanskrit
- Santali
- Sindhi
- Tamil
- Telugu
- Urdu
Sahitya Akademi Translation Prizes
- Assamese
- Bengali
- Bodo
- Dogri
- English
- Gujarati
- Hindi
- Kannada
- Kashmiri
- Konkani
- Maithili
- Malayalam
- Marathi
- Meitei (Manipuri)
- Nepali
- Odia
- Punjabi
- Rajasthani
- Sanskrit
- Santali
- Sindhi
- Tamil
- Telugu
- Urdu
Sahitya Akademi Yuva Puraskar
- Assamese
- Bengali
- Bodo
- Dogri
- English
- Gujarati
- Hindi
- Kannada
- Kashmiri
- Konkani
- Maithili
- Malayalam
- Meitei (Manipuri)
- Marathi
- Nepali
- Odia
- Punjabi
- Rajasthani
- Sanskrit
- Santali
- Sindhi
- Tamil
- Telugu
- Urdu
Sahitya Akademi Bal Sahitya Puraskar
- Assamese
- Bengali
- Bodo
- Dogri
- English
- Gujarati
- Hindi
- Kannada
- Kashmiri
- Konkani
- Maithili
- Malayalam
- Meitei (Manipuri)
- Marathi
- Nepali
- Odia
- Punjabi
- Rajasthani
- Sanskrit
- Santali
- Sindhi
- Tamil
- Telugu
- Urdu
Related
- Eighth Schedule to the Constitution of India
- Official Languages Commission
- List of languages by number of native speakers in India

Yuva Puraskar is given each year to young writers for their outstanding works in the 24 languages, since 2011.

== Recipients ==
Following is the list of recipients of Yuva Puraskar for their works written in Tamil. The award comprises a cash prize of Rs. 50,000 and an engraved copper plaque.

Year	Author	Work	Type of Work	References
2011	M. Thavasi	Sevalkattu	Novel	
2012	Malarvathi	Thooppukkari	Novel	
2013	Kathir Bharathi	Messiyavukku Moondru Machangal	Poetry	
2014	R. Abilash	Kaalkal	Novel	
2015	Veerapandiyan	Parukkai	Novel	
2016	Lakshmi Saravanan Kumar	Kaanakan	Novel	
2017	J. Jayabharathi	Aathik Kathalin Ninaiuv Kurippukal	Poetry	
2018	Suneel Krishnan	Ambu Padukkai	Short Stories	
2019	Sabarinathan	Vaal	Poetry	
2020	Shakti	Mara Naai	Poetry	
2021	Karthik Balasubramanian	Natchatravaasikal	Novel	
2022	P. Kali Muthu	Thanithirukkum Aralikalin Mathiyam	Poetry	
2023	Ram Thangam	Thirukarthiyal	Short Stories	
2024	Lokesh Raghuraman	Vishnu Vandhar	Short Stories	
2025	Latshmihar	Kuttonru Kutirru	Short Stories	

== See also ==
- List of Sahitya Akademi Award winners for Tamil
- List of Sahitya Akademi Translation Prize winners for Tamil
