= List of Bal Sahitya Puraskar winners for Dogri =

Winners of a literary honour in India

Part of a series on

Sahitya Akademi Awards
Category
Sahitya Akademi Award winners by language
- Assamese
- Bengali
- Bodo
- Dogri
- English
- Gujarati
- Hindi
- Kannada
- Kashmiri
- Konkani
- Maithili
- Malayalam
- Marathi
- Meitei (Manipuri)
- Nepali
- Odia
- Punjabi
- Rajasthani
- Sanskrit
- Santali
- Sindhi
- Tamil
- Telugu
- Urdu
Sahitya Akademi Translation Prizes
- Assamese
- Bengali
- Bodo
- Dogri
- English
- Gujarati
- Hindi
- Kannada
- Kashmiri
- Konkani
- Maithili
- Malayalam
- Marathi
- Meitei (Manipuri)
- Nepali
- Odia
- Punjabi
- Rajasthani
- Sanskrit
- Santali
- Sindhi
- Tamil
- Telugu
- Urdu
Sahitya Akademi Yuva Puraskar
- Assamese
- Bengali
- Bodo
- Dogri
- English
- Gujarati
- Hindi
- Kannada
- Kashmiri
- Konkani
- Maithili
- Malayalam
- Meitei (Manipuri)
- Marathi
- Nepali
- Odia
- Punjabi
- Rajasthani
- Sanskrit
- Santali
- Sindhi
- Tamil
- Telugu
- Urdu
Sahitya Akademi Bal Sahitya Puraskar
- Assamese
- Bengali
- Bodo
- Dogri
- English
- Gujarati
- Hindi
- Kannada
- Kashmiri
- Konkani
- Maithili
- Malayalam
- Meitei (Manipuri)
- Marathi
- Nepali
- Odia
- Punjabi
- Rajasthani
- Sanskrit
- Santali
- Sindhi
- Tamil
- Telugu
- Urdu
Related
- Eighth Schedule to the Constitution of India
- Official Languages Commission
- List of languages by number of native speakers in India

Bal Sahitya Puraskar is given each year to writers for their outstanding works in the 24 languages, since 2010.

== Recipients ==
Following is the list of recipients of Bal Sahitya Puraskar for their works written in Dogri. The award comprises a cash prize of Rs. 50,000 and an engraved copper plaque.

Year	Author	Work	Genre	References
2010	Gianeshwar Sharma	Phi Keh Hoa	Novel	
2011	Shyam Dutt ‘Parag’			
2012	Bansi Lai Sharma	Dikho Te Sikho	Poetry	
2013	Krishan Sharma	Khadaune	Stories	
2014	Dhian Singh	Pardhe Nyaane Gurdhe Syaane	Poetry	
2015	Tara Chand Kalandri	Satrangi Peengh	Poetry	
2016	Om Goswami	Jangal Ch Mangal	Novel	
2017	Sudesh Raj	Jangal Di Sair	Short Stories	
2018	NO AWARD			
2019	Vijay Sharma	Larjaan	Poetry	
2020	Shiv Dev Sushil	Dadi Da Hirkh	Short Stories	
2021	Narsingh Dev Jamwal	Khadak Singh Te Usda Guglu	Short Novel	
2022	Rajeshwar Singh ‘Raju’	Sikh-Mat	Short Stories	
2023	Balwan Singh Jamoria	Kanjkan	Petry	
2024	Bishan Singh 'Dardi'	Kukdu Kadoon	Poetry	
2025	P. L. Parihar “Shaad”	Nanhi Tor	Poetry	

== See also ==
- List of Sahitya Akademi Award winners for Dogri
