= List of Bal Sahitya Puraskar winners for Telugu =

Winners of a literary honour in India

Part of a series on

Sahitya Akademi Awards
Category
Sahitya Akademi Award winners by language
- Assamese
- Bengali
- Bodo
- Dogri
- English
- Gujarati
- Hindi
- Kannada
- Kashmiri
- Konkani
- Maithili
- Malayalam
- Marathi
- Meitei (Manipuri)
- Nepali
- Odia
- Punjabi
- Rajasthani
- Sanskrit
- Santali
- Sindhi
- Tamil
- Telugu
- Urdu
Sahitya Akademi Translation Prizes
- Assamese
- Bengali
- Bodo
- Dogri
- English
- Gujarati
- Hindi
- Kannada
- Kashmiri
- Konkani
- Maithili
- Malayalam
- Marathi
- Meitei (Manipuri)
- Nepali
- Odia
- Punjabi
- Rajasthani
- Sanskrit
- Santali
- Sindhi
- Tamil
- Telugu
- Urdu
Sahitya Akademi Yuva Puraskar
- Assamese
- Bengali
- Bodo
- Dogri
- English
- Gujarati
- Hindi
- Kannada
- Kashmiri
- Konkani
- Maithili
- Malayalam
- Meitei (Manipuri)
- Marathi
- Nepali
- Odia
- Punjabi
- Rajasthani
- Sanskrit
- Santali
- Sindhi
- Tamil
- Telugu
- Urdu
Sahitya Akademi Bal Sahitya Puraskar
- Assamese
- Bengali
- Bodo
- Dogri
- English
- Gujarati
- Hindi
- Kannada
- Kashmiri
- Konkani
- Maithili
- Malayalam
- Meitei (Manipuri)
- Marathi
- Nepali
- Odia
- Punjabi
- Rajasthani
- Sanskrit
- Santali
- Sindhi
- Tamil
- Telugu
- Urdu
Related
- Eighth Schedule to the Constitution of India
- Official Languages Commission
- List of languages by number of native speakers in India

Bal Sahitya Puraskar is given each year to writers for their outstanding works in the 24 languages, since 2010.

== Recipients ==
Following is the list of recipients of Bal Sahitya Puraskar for their works written in Telugu. The award comprises a cash prize of Rs. 50,000 and an engraved copper plaque.

Year	Author	Work	Genre	References
2010	Kaluvakolanu Sadananda	Adavi Talli	Novel	
2011	M. Bhoopal Reddy	Uggupaalu	Short Stories	
2012	Reddy Raghavaiah	Chiru Divvelu	Poetry	
2013	D. Sujatha Devi	Aatalo Aratipandu	Stories	
2014	Dasari Venkataramana	Anandam	Stories	
2015	Chokkapu Venkata Ramana	Total Contribution to Children's Literature		
2016	Alaparthi Venkata Subba Rao 'Balabhamdhu'	Swarna Pushpaalu	Poetry	
2017	Vasala Narasaiah	Total Contribution to Children's Literature		
2018	Naramshetti Umamaheswar Rao	Aananda Lokam		
2019	Belagam Bheemeswara Rao	Thatha Maata Varaala Moota	Short Stories	
2020	Kanneganti Anasuya	Snehitilu	Short Stories	
2021	Devaraju Maharaju	Nenu Ante Evaru?	Play	
2022	Pattipaka Mohan	Baalala Taataa Baapuji	Poetry	
2023	D. K. Chaduvula Babu	Vajrala Vanana	Short Stories	
2024	P. Chandrashekhar Azad	Maya Lokam	Novel	
2025	Gangisetti Sivakumar	Kaburla Devatha	Story	

== See also ==
- List of Sahitya Akademi Award winners for Telugu
