= List of Bal Sahitya Puraskar winners for Kashmiri =

Winners of a literary honour in India

Part of a series on

Sahitya Akademi Awards
Category
Sahitya Akademi Award winners by language
- Assamese
- Bengali
- Bodo
- Dogri
- English
- Gujarati
- Hindi
- Kannada
- Kashmiri
- Konkani
- Maithili
- Malayalam
- Marathi
- Meitei (Manipuri)
- Nepali
- Odia
- Punjabi
- Rajasthani
- Sanskrit
- Santali
- Sindhi
- Tamil
- Telugu
- Urdu
Sahitya Akademi Translation Prizes
- Assamese
- Bengali
- Bodo
- Dogri
- English
- Gujarati
- Hindi
- Kannada
- Kashmiri
- Konkani
- Maithili
- Malayalam
- Marathi
- Meitei (Manipuri)
- Nepali
- Odia
- Punjabi
- Rajasthani
- Sanskrit
- Santali
- Sindhi
- Tamil
- Telugu
- Urdu
Sahitya Akademi Yuva Puraskar
- Assamese
- Bengali
- Bodo
- Dogri
- English
- Gujarati
- Hindi
- Kannada
- Kashmiri
- Konkani
- Maithili
- Malayalam
- Meitei (Manipuri)
- Marathi
- Nepali
- Odia
- Punjabi
- Rajasthani
- Sanskrit
- Santali
- Sindhi
- Tamil
- Telugu
- Urdu
Sahitya Akademi Bal Sahitya Puraskar
- Assamese
- Bengali
- Bodo
- Dogri
- English
- Gujarati
- Hindi
- Kannada
- Kashmiri
- Konkani
- Maithili
- Malayalam
- Meitei (Manipuri)
- Marathi
- Nepali
- Odia
- Punjabi
- Rajasthani
- Sanskrit
- Santali
- Sindhi
- Tamil
- Telugu
- Urdu
Related
- Eighth Schedule to the Constitution of India
- Official Languages Commission
- List of languages by number of native speakers in India

Bal Sahitya Puraskar is given each year to writers for their outstanding works in the 24 languages, since 2010.

== Recipients ==
Following is the list of recipients of Bal Sahitya Puraskar for their works written in Kashmiri. The award comprises a cash prize of Rs. 50,000 and an engraved copper plaque.

| Year | Author | Work | Genre | References |
|---|---|---|---|---|
| 2010 | S. Razi | Kath Wany | Poetry | |
| 2011 | Gulam Nabi Aatash | Nov Kentsha Mentsha | Poetry & Short Stories | |
| 2012 | Ayub Sabir | Gulalane Shadmani | Poetry | |
| 2013 | Rashid Kanispori | Gul Te Bulbul | Essays & Poetry | |
| 2014 | Hamid Siraj | Haari Jang | Novelette | |
| 2015 | Nayeem Kashmiri | Goloo Katha Boozive | Short Stories | |
| 2016 | Roohi Jan | Shoer Bashe | Stories | |
| 2017 | Showkat Ansari | Jiggar Khaunt | Poetry | |
| 2018 | Zareef Ahmad Zareef | TchonchiPoot | Poetry | |
| 2019 | Naji Munauwar | Shurin Hund Naji | Poetry | |
| 2020 | Syed Akhtar Hussain Mansoor | Paghich Aash | Poetry | |
| 2021 | Majeed Majazi | Phulai Gulan Henz | Short Stories | |
| 2022 | Qamer Hamidullah | Daiel | Poetry | |
| 2023 | NO AWARD | | | |
| 2024 | Muzaffar Hussain Dilbar | Sone Gobrew | Poetry | |
| 2025 | Izhar Mubashir | Shure Ta Toturu Gyash | Short Stories | |

== See also ==
- List of Sahitya Akademi Award winners for Kashmiri
