= List of Yuva Puraskar winners for Assamese =

List of winners of a literary honor in India

Part of a series on

Sahitya Akademi Awards
Category
Sahitya Akademi Award winners by language
- Assamese
- Bengali
- Bodo
- Dogri
- English
- Gujarati
- Hindi
- Kannada
- Kashmiri
- Konkani
- Maithili
- Malayalam
- Marathi
- Meitei (Manipuri)
- Nepali
- Odia
- Punjabi
- Rajasthani
- Sanskrit
- Santali
- Sindhi
- Tamil
- Telugu
- Urdu
Sahitya Akademi Translation Prizes
- Assamese
- Bengali
- Bodo
- Dogri
- English
- Gujarati
- Hindi
- Kannada
- Kashmiri
- Konkani
- Maithili
- Malayalam
- Marathi
- Meitei (Manipuri)
- Nepali
- Odia
- Punjabi
- Rajasthani
- Sanskrit
- Santali
- Sindhi
- Tamil
- Telugu
- Urdu
Sahitya Akademi Yuva Puraskar
- Assamese
- Bengali
- Bodo
- Dogri
- English
- Gujarati
- Hindi
- Kannada
- Kashmiri
- Konkani
- Maithili
- Malayalam
- Meitei (Manipuri)
- Marathi
- Nepali
- Odia
- Punjabi
- Rajasthani
- Sanskrit
- Santali
- Sindhi
- Tamil
- Telugu
- Urdu
Sahitya Akademi Bal Sahitya Puraskar
- Assamese
- Bengali
- Bodo
- Dogri
- English
- Gujarati
- Hindi
- Kannada
- Kashmiri
- Konkani
- Maithili
- Malayalam
- Meitei (Manipuri)
- Marathi
- Nepali
- Odia
- Punjabi
- Rajasthani
- Sanskrit
- Santali
- Sindhi
- Tamil
- Telugu
- Urdu
Related
- Eighth Schedule to the Constitution of India
- Official Languages Commission
- List of languages by number of native speakers in India

Yuva Puraskar is given each year to young writers for their outstanding works in the 24 languages, since 2011.

== Recipients ==
Following is the list of recipients of Yuva Puraskar for their works written in Assamese. The award comprises a cash prize of Rs. 50,000 and an engraved copper plaque.

Year	Author	Work	Type of Work	Reference
2011	Arindam Borkataki	Anusilon	Essay	
2012	Kamal Kumar Tanti	Marangburu Amar Pita	Poetry	
2013	Bijoy Sankar Barman	Ashokastami	Poetry	
2014	Manika Devee	Jahar-Mahar	Short stories	
2015	Mridul Haloi	Akale Aso Kushale Aso	Poetry	
2016	Prartana Saikia	Zantadhari	Novel	
2017	Pratim Baruah	Xodhahe Nohol Tok o Bokul	Poetry	
2018	Bipasha Bora	Mou-Makshi Samrajya	Short Stories	
2019	Sanjib Pol Deka	Ei Pine Ki Ase?	Short Story	
2020	Dwijen Das	Megh-Ghora	Poetry	
2021	Abhijit Bora	Deuka Kobai Jay	Short Stories	
2022	Pradyumna Kumar Gogoi	Choki Aru Anyanya Galpa	Short Stories	
2023	Jintu Gitartha	Mon Mora Tora	Short Stories	
2024	Nayanjyoti Sarma	Jaal Kota Jui	Short Stories	
2025	Suprakash Bhuyan	Kuchiyanama	Short Stories	

== See also ==
- List of Sahitya Akademi Award winners for Assamese
- List of Sahitya Akademi Translation Prize winners for Assamese
