= Bikram Bir Thapa =

Indian Nepali language writer

- Born: 22 February 1948 (age 78); Shillong, Undivided Assam (present-day Meghalaya)
- Other names: Vikramveer Thapa; Bikrambir Thapa
- Occupations: Writer, painter
- Awards: Sahitya Akademi Award for Nepali

Bikram Bir Thapa (Nepali: विक्रमवीर थापा; also called Vikramveer Thapa; 22 February 1948) is an Indian painter and Nepali language writer, best known for his short stories. In 1999, he won the Sahitya Akademi Award for Nepali language for his work Bishaun Shatabdi Ki Monalisa.

== Early life ==
Bikram Bir Thapa was born on 22 February 1948 in Shillong, Meghalaya to father Raghuvir Thapa Magar and mother Kaushalya Devi Thapa Magar . His father was a retired Gurkha Subedar who died when Thapa was 4 years old. On 16 May 1968, he joined the Indian Army in the infantry regiment of 5th Gorkha Rifles (Frontier Force) and participated in the Bangladesh Liberation War.

== Career ==
He first published his first story in 1969, called Communist in the Tarun newspaper from Shillong. In 1983, Thapa published romantic novel, Bigatko Parivesh Bhitra, set in his hometown. His Teestadekhi Sutlejsamma deals with the identity crisis of the Indian Gorkhas.

In 1999, he was awarded the prestigious Sahitya Akademi Award for Nepali language for his work Bishaun Shatabdi Ki Monalisa. Bikram Bir Thapa Library School is one of the earliest Nepali-language school in Meghalaya, which is named after him.

== Publications ==
- Communist (Nepali: कम्युनिष्ट), 1969
- Upahar (Nepali: उपहार), 1973/74
- Bigatko Parivesh Bhitra (Nepali: विगतको परिवेशभित्र), novel, 1983
- Teestadekhi Sutlejsamma (Nepali: टिस्टादेखि सतलजसम्म), novel, 1986
- Hatya: Rato Dairyko (Nepali: हत्या: रातो डायरीको), 1994
- Bishaun Shatabdi Ki Monalisa (Nepali: बीसौं शताब्दीकी मोनालिसा), 1997
- Mato Boldo Ho (Nepali: माटो बोल्दो हो), novel, 2007
- Manisingh Gurung (Nepali: मणिसिंह गुरुङ), biography, 2010
- Kargil Yuddha (Nepali: कारगिल युद्ध), autobiography, 2016

== Awards ==
- Sahitya Akademi Award (1999) for Bishaun Shatabdi Ki Monalisa
- Kanchenjunga National Award by Nepali Sahitya Parishad Sikkim

== See also ==
- List of Sahitya Akademi Award winners for Nepali
