= List of Bal Sahitya Puraskar winners for Sanskrit =

Winners of a literary honour in India

Part of a series on

Sahitya Akademi Awards
Category
Sahitya Akademi Award winners by language
- Assamese
- Bengali
- Bodo
- Dogri
- English
- Gujarati
- Hindi
- Kannada
- Kashmiri
- Konkani
- Maithili
- Malayalam
- Marathi
- Meitei (Manipuri)
- Nepali
- Odia
- Punjabi
- Rajasthani
- Sanskrit
- Santali
- Sindhi
- Tamil
- Telugu
- Urdu
Sahitya Akademi Translation Prizes
- Assamese
- Bengali
- Bodo
- Dogri
- English
- Gujarati
- Hindi
- Kannada
- Kashmiri
- Konkani
- Maithili
- Malayalam
- Marathi
- Meitei (Manipuri)
- Nepali
- Odia
- Punjabi
- Rajasthani
- Sanskrit
- Santali
- Sindhi
- Tamil
- Telugu
- Urdu
Sahitya Akademi Yuva Puraskar
- Assamese
- Bengali
- Bodo
- Dogri
- English
- Gujarati
- Hindi
- Kannada
- Kashmiri
- Konkani
- Maithili
- Malayalam
- Meitei (Manipuri)
- Marathi
- Nepali
- Odia
- Punjabi
- Rajasthani
- Sanskrit
- Santali
- Sindhi
- Tamil
- Telugu
- Urdu
Sahitya Akademi Bal Sahitya Puraskar
- Assamese
- Bengali
- Bodo
- Dogri
- English
- Gujarati
- Hindi
- Kannada
- Kashmiri
- Konkani
- Maithili
- Malayalam
- Meitei (Manipuri)
- Marathi
- Nepali
- Odia
- Punjabi
- Rajasthani
- Sanskrit
- Santali
- Sindhi
- Tamil
- Telugu
- Urdu
Related
- Eighth Schedule to the Constitution of India
- Official Languages Commission
- List of languages by number of native speakers in India

Bal Sahitya Puraskar is given each year to writers for their outstanding works in the 24 languages, since 2010.

== Recipients ==
Following is the list of recipients of Bal Sahitya Puraskar for their works written in Sanskrit. The award comprises a cash prize of Rs. 50,000 and an engraved copper plaque.

Year	Author	Work	Genre	References
2010	Padma Sastry	Sanskrit-Katha-Satakam (in 2 Vols.)	Short Stories	
2011	Abhiraj Rajendra Mishra	Kaumarm	Poetry	
2012	Om Prakash Thakur	Isap-Katha Nikunjam	Short Stories	
2013	H. R. Vishwasa	Marjalasya Mukham Drishtam	Plays	
2014	NO AWARD			
2015	Janardan Hegde	Balakathasaptatih	Stories	
2016	Rishiraj Jani	Chamtkarikah Chaladurabhashah	Short Story	
2017	Rajkumar Mishra	Dayate Kathamakashe	Poetry	
2018	Sampadananda Mishra	Shanaih Shanaih	Poetry	
2019	Sanjay Chaubey	Chitva Trinam Trinam	Poetry	
2020	Aravind Kumar Tiwari	Balagunjanam	Poetry	
2021	Asha Agrawal	Kathamadhuri	Short Stories	
2022	Kuldeep Sharma	Sachitram Prahelikasatkam (Abhinavsanskritprahelikah)	Poetry	
2023	Radha Vallabh Tripathi	Manavi	Novel	
2024	Harshadev Madhav	Bubhukshitah Kakah	Short Stories	
2025	Preeti Pujara	Balvisvam	Poetry	

== See also ==
- List of Sahitya Akademi Award winners for Sanskrit
