= List of Bal Sahitya Puraskar winners for Assamese =

Winners of a literary honour in India

Part of a series on

Sahitya Akademi Awards
Category
Sahitya Akademi Award winners by language
- Assamese
- Bengali
- Bodo
- Dogri
- English
- Gujarati
- Hindi
- Kannada
- Kashmiri
- Konkani
- Maithili
- Malayalam
- Marathi
- Meitei (Manipuri)
- Nepali
- Odia
- Punjabi
- Rajasthani
- Sanskrit
- Santali
- Sindhi
- Tamil
- Telugu
- Urdu
Sahitya Akademi Translation Prizes
- Assamese
- Bengali
- Bodo
- Dogri
- English
- Gujarati
- Hindi
- Kannada
- Kashmiri
- Konkani
- Maithili
- Malayalam
- Marathi
- Meitei (Manipuri)
- Nepali
- Odia
- Punjabi
- Rajasthani
- Sanskrit
- Santali
- Sindhi
- Tamil
- Telugu
- Urdu
Sahitya Akademi Yuva Puraskar
- Assamese
- Bengali
- Bodo
- Dogri
- English
- Gujarati
- Hindi
- Kannada
- Kashmiri
- Konkani
- Maithili
- Malayalam
- Meitei (Manipuri)
- Marathi
- Nepali
- Odia
- Punjabi
- Rajasthani
- Sanskrit
- Santali
- Sindhi
- Tamil
- Telugu
- Urdu
Sahitya Akademi Bal Sahitya Puraskar
- Assamese
- Bengali
- Bodo
- Dogri
- English
- Gujarati
- Hindi
- Kannada
- Kashmiri
- Konkani
- Maithili
- Malayalam
- Meitei (Manipuri)
- Marathi
- Nepali
- Odia
- Punjabi
- Rajasthani
- Sanskrit
- Santali
- Sindhi
- Tamil
- Telugu
- Urdu
Related
- Eighth Schedule to the Constitution of India
- Official Languages Commission
- List of languages by number of native speakers in India

Bal Sahitya Puraskar is given each year to writers for their outstanding works in the 24 languages, since 2010.

== Recipients ==
Following is the list of recipients of Bal Sahitya Puraskar for their works written in Assamese. The award comprises a cash prize of Rs. 50,000 and an engraved copper plaque.

Year	Author	Work	Genre	References
2010	Gagan Chandra Adhikari	Total Contribution to Children's Literature		
2011	Bandita Phukan	Seujia Dharani	Novel	
2012	Santanoo Tamuly	Total Contribution to Children's Literature		
2013	Toshaprabha Kalita	Total Contribution to Children's Literature		
2014	Dinesh Chandra Goswami	Bijnanar Anupam Jagat	Essays	
2015	Eli Ahmed	Total Contribution to Children's Literature		
2016	Harapriya Barukial Borgohain	Total Contribution to Children's Literature		
2017	Horendra Nath Borthakur	Total Contribution to Children's Literature		
2018	Jugallochan Das	Sonbali Bagichar Bhoot	Novel	
2019	Swamim Nasrin	Mili, Amia Aru Ekhon Nadi	Short Stories	
2020	Madhurima Gharphalia	Phosong	Short Stories	
2021	Mrinal Chandra Kalita	Bakul Phular Dare	Novel	
2022	Diganta Oza	Dangor Manuhor Sadhu	Essays	
2023	Rothindranath Goswami	Powalmoni Aru Chichingar Duhxahaxik Abhijan	Novel	
2024	Ranju Hazarika	Biponna Bismoi Khel	Novel	
2025	Surendra Mohan Das	Mainaahantar Padya	Poetry	

== See also ==
- List of Sahitya Akademi Award winners for Assamese
