= List of Bal Sahitya Puraskar Winners for Tamil =

Winners of a literary honour in India

Part of a series on

Sahitya Akademi Awards
Category
Sahitya Akademi Award winners by language
- Assamese
- Bengali
- Bodo
- Dogri
- English
- Gujarati
- Hindi
- Kannada
- Kashmiri
- Konkani
- Maithili
- Malayalam
- Marathi
- Meitei (Manipuri)
- Nepali
- Odia
- Punjabi
- Rajasthani
- Sanskrit
- Santali
- Sindhi
- Tamil
- Telugu
- Urdu
Sahitya Akademi Translation Prizes
- Assamese
- Bengali
- Bodo
- Dogri
- English
- Gujarati
- Hindi
- Kannada
- Kashmiri
- Konkani
- Maithili
- Malayalam
- Marathi
- Meitei (Manipuri)
- Nepali
- Odia
- Punjabi
- Rajasthani
- Sanskrit
- Santali
- Sindhi
- Tamil
- Telugu
- Urdu
Sahitya Akademi Yuva Puraskar
- Assamese
- Bengali
- Bodo
- Dogri
- English
- Gujarati
- Hindi
- Kannada
- Kashmiri
- Konkani
- Maithili
- Malayalam
- Meitei (Manipuri)
- Marathi
- Nepali
- Odia
- Punjabi
- Rajasthani
- Sanskrit
- Santali
- Sindhi
- Tamil
- Telugu
- Urdu
Sahitya Akademi Bal Sahitya Puraskar
- Assamese
- Bengali
- Bodo
- Dogri
- English
- Gujarati
- Hindi
- Kannada
- Kashmiri
- Konkani
- Maithili
- Malayalam
- Meitei (Manipuri)
- Marathi
- Nepali
- Odia
- Punjabi
- Rajasthani
- Sanskrit
- Santali
- Sindhi
- Tamil
- Telugu
- Urdu
Related
- Eighth Schedule to the Constitution of India
- Official Languages Commission
- List of languages by number of native speakers in India

Bal Sahitya Puraskar is given each year to authors of outstanding works in 24 languages, since 2010.

== Recipients ==
Following is the list of recipients of Bal Sahitya Puraskar for their works written in Tamil. The award comprises a cash prize of Rs. 50,000 and an engraved copper plaque.

Year	Author	Work	Genre	References
2010	Ma. Kamalavelan	Antoniyin Attukkutti	Novel	
2011	M. L. Thangappa	Cholak Kollai Bommai	Poetry	
2012	K. M. Kothandam	Kattukkulle Isaivizha	Short Stories	
2013	Revathy (E.S. Hariharan)	Pavalam Thantha Parisu	Stories	
2014	Era Natarasan	Vigghana Vikramaathithan Kathaikal	Stories	
2015	Sella Ganapathy	Thedal Vettai	Poetry	
2016	Kuzha. Kathiresan	Total Contribution to Children's Literature		
2017	Velu Saravanan	Total Contribution to Children's Literature		
2018	Kriungai Sethupathy	Siragu Mulaitha Yaanai	Poetry	
2019	Devi Nachiappan (Deivanai)	Total Contribution to Children's Literature		
2020	Yes. Balabharathi	Marappachi Sonna Rahasiyam	Novel	
2021	Mu. Murugesh	Ammavukku Magal Sonna Ulagin Mudhal Kadhai	Short Stories	
2022	G. Meenakshi	Malligavin Veedu	Short Stories	
2023	Udayasankar	Aadhanin Bommai	Novel	
2024	Yuma Vasuki	Thanviyin Piranthanal	Stories	
2025	Vishnupuram Saravanan	Otrai Siragu Oviya	Novel	

== See also ==
- List of Sahitya Akademi Award winners for Tamil
