= List of Yuva Puraskar winners for Kannada =

List of winners of a literary honor in India

Part of a series on

Sahitya Akademi Awards
Category
Sahitya Akademi Award winners by language
- Assamese
- Bengali
- Bodo
- Dogri
- English
- Gujarati
- Hindi
- Kannada
- Kashmiri
- Konkani
- Maithili
- Malayalam
- Marathi
- Meitei (Manipuri)
- Nepali
- Odia
- Punjabi
- Rajasthani
- Sanskrit
- Santali
- Sindhi
- Tamil
- Telugu
- Urdu
Sahitya Akademi Translation Prizes
- Assamese
- Bengali
- Bodo
- Dogri
- English
- Gujarati
- Hindi
- Kannada
- Kashmiri
- Konkani
- Maithili
- Malayalam
- Marathi
- Meitei (Manipuri)
- Nepali
- Odia
- Punjabi
- Rajasthani
- Sanskrit
- Santali
- Sindhi
- Tamil
- Telugu
- Urdu
Sahitya Akademi Yuva Puraskar
- Assamese
- Bengali
- Bodo
- Dogri
- English
- Gujarati
- Hindi
- Kannada
- Kashmiri
- Konkani
- Maithili
- Malayalam
- Meitei (Manipuri)
- Marathi
- Nepali
- Odia
- Punjabi
- Rajasthani
- Sanskrit
- Santali
- Sindhi
- Tamil
- Telugu
- Urdu
Sahitya Akademi Bal Sahitya Puraskar
- Assamese
- Bengali
- Bodo
- Dogri
- English
- Gujarati
- Hindi
- Kannada
- Kashmiri
- Konkani
- Maithili
- Malayalam
- Meitei (Manipuri)
- Marathi
- Nepali
- Odia
- Punjabi
- Rajasthani
- Sanskrit
- Santali
- Sindhi
- Tamil
- Telugu
- Urdu
Related
- Eighth Schedule to the Constitution of India
- Official Languages Commission
- List of languages by number of native speakers in India

Yuva Puraskar is given each year to young writers for their outstanding works in the 24 languages, since 2011.

== Recipients ==
Following is the list of recipients of Yuva Puraskar for their works written in Kannada. The award comprises a cash prize of Rs. 50,000 and an engraved copper plaque.

Year	Author	Work	Genre	References
2011	Veeranna Madiwalara	Nelada Karuneya Dani	Poetry	
2012	Arif Raja	Jangama Fakeerana Jolige	Poetry	
2013	Lakkur Ananda	Batavadeyagada Raseethi	Poetry	
2014	Kavya Kadame	Dhyanake Thaareekhina Hangilla	Poetry	
2015	Mounesh Badiger	Mayakolahala	Short Stories	
2016	Vikrama Hatwara	Zero Mathu Ondu	Short Stories	
2017	Shanthi K. Appanna	Manasu Abhisaarike	Short Stories	
2018	Padmanabha Bhat	Kepina Dabbi	Short Stories	
2019	Fakeer (Shridhar Banvasi G.C.)	Beru	Novel	
2020	K. S. Mahadevaswamy	Dhoopada Makkalu	Short Stories	
2021	H. Lakshmi Narayan Swamy	Togala Cheelada Karna	Poetry	
2022	Dadapeer Jyman	Neelakurinji	Short Stories	
2023	Manjunayak Challur	Phoo Mattu Ithara Kathegalu	Short Stories	
2024	Shruthi B. R.	Zero Balance	Poetry	
2025	R. Dileepkumar	Pacceya Jaguli	Criticism	

== See also ==
- List of Sahitya Akademi Award winners for Kannada
- List of Sahitya Akademi Translation Prize winners for Kannada
