= List of Bal Sahitya Puraskar winners for Maithili =

Winners of a literary honour in India

Part of a series on

Sahitya Akademi Awards
Category
Sahitya Akademi Award winners by language
- Assamese
- Bengali
- Bodo
- Dogri
- English
- Gujarati
- Hindi
- Kannada
- Kashmiri
- Konkani
- Maithili
- Malayalam
- Marathi
- Meitei (Manipuri)
- Nepali
- Odia
- Punjabi
- Rajasthani
- Sanskrit
- Santali
- Sindhi
- Tamil
- Telugu
- Urdu
Sahitya Akademi Translation Prizes
- Assamese
- Bengali
- Bodo
- Dogri
- English
- Gujarati
- Hindi
- Kannada
- Kashmiri
- Konkani
- Maithili
- Malayalam
- Marathi
- Meitei (Manipuri)
- Nepali
- Odia
- Punjabi
- Rajasthani
- Sanskrit
- Santali
- Sindhi
- Tamil
- Telugu
- Urdu
Sahitya Akademi Yuva Puraskar
- Assamese
- Bengali
- Bodo
- Dogri
- English
- Gujarati
- Hindi
- Kannada
- Kashmiri
- Konkani
- Maithili
- Malayalam
- Meitei (Manipuri)
- Marathi
- Nepali
- Odia
- Punjabi
- Rajasthani
- Sanskrit
- Santali
- Sindhi
- Tamil
- Telugu
- Urdu
Sahitya Akademi Bal Sahitya Puraskar
- Assamese
- Bengali
- Bodo
- Dogri
- English
- Gujarati
- Hindi
- Kannada
- Kashmiri
- Konkani
- Maithili
- Malayalam
- Meitei (Manipuri)
- Marathi
- Nepali
- Odia
- Punjabi
- Rajasthani
- Sanskrit
- Santali
- Sindhi
- Tamil
- Telugu
- Urdu
Related
- Eighth Schedule to the Constitution of India
- Official Languages Commission
- List of languages by number of native speakers in India

Bal Sahitya Puraskar is given each year to writers for their outstanding works in the 24 languages, since 2010.

== Recipients ==
Following is the list of recipients of Bal Sahitya Puraskar for their works written in Maithili. The award comprises a cash prize of Rs. 50,000 and an engraved copper plaque.

Year	Author	Work	Genre	Ref.
2010	Tara Nand Viyogee	Ee Bhetal Tan Ki Bhetal	Short Stories	
2011	Mayanath Jha	Jakar Nari Chatur Hoi	Short Stories	
2012	Muralidhar Jha	Pilpilha Gachha	Short Stories	
2013	Dhirendra Kumar Jha	Hamra Beech Vigyan	Essays	
2014	Jeevakant	Hamar Athanni Khaslai Van Me	Poetry	
2015	Ramdeo Jha	Hansani Pan A Bajanta Supari	Novel	
2016	Prem Mohan Mishra	Bharat Bhagya Vidhata (Part-I)	Biography	
2017	Amlendu Sekhar Pathak	Lalgachhi	Novel	
2018	Vaidya Nath Jha	Khissa Sunu Bau	Short Stories	
2019	Rishi Bashistha	Ee Phoolak Guldasta	Stories	
2020	Siya Ram Jha 'Saras'	Sonahula Ijotwala Khidki	Poetry	
2021	Anmol Jha	Lagi Jo Phool Akash	Poetry	
2022	Virendra Jha	Uran Chhoo	Short Stories	
2023	Akshay Anand 'Sunny'	Ol Katra, Jhol Katra	Poetry	
2024	Narayanjee	Anar	Short Stories	
2025	Munni Kamat	Oudika	Short Stories	

== See also ==
- List of Sahitya Akademi Award winners for Maithili
