= List of Bal Sahitya Puraskar winners for Marathi =

Winners of a literary honour in India

Part of a series on

Sahitya Akademi Awards
Category
Sahitya Akademi Award winners by language
- Assamese
- Bengali
- Bodo
- Dogri
- English
- Gujarati
- Hindi
- Kannada
- Kashmiri
- Konkani
- Maithili
- Malayalam
- Marathi
- Meitei (Manipuri)
- Nepali
- Odia
- Punjabi
- Rajasthani
- Sanskrit
- Santali
- Sindhi
- Tamil
- Telugu
- Urdu
Sahitya Akademi Translation Prizes
- Assamese
- Bengali
- Bodo
- Dogri
- English
- Gujarati
- Hindi
- Kannada
- Kashmiri
- Konkani
- Maithili
- Malayalam
- Marathi
- Meitei (Manipuri)
- Nepali
- Odia
- Punjabi
- Rajasthani
- Sanskrit
- Santali
- Sindhi
- Tamil
- Telugu
- Urdu
Sahitya Akademi Yuva Puraskar
- Assamese
- Bengali
- Bodo
- Dogri
- English
- Gujarati
- Hindi
- Kannada
- Kashmiri
- Konkani
- Maithili
- Malayalam
- Meitei (Manipuri)
- Marathi
- Nepali
- Odia
- Punjabi
- Rajasthani
- Sanskrit
- Santali
- Sindhi
- Tamil
- Telugu
- Urdu
Sahitya Akademi Bal Sahitya Puraskar
- Assamese
- Bengali
- Bodo
- Dogri
- English
- Gujarati
- Hindi
- Kannada
- Kashmiri
- Konkani
- Maithili
- Malayalam
- Meitei (Manipuri)
- Marathi
- Nepali
- Odia
- Punjabi
- Rajasthani
- Sanskrit
- Santali
- Sindhi
- Tamil
- Telugu
- Urdu
Related
- Eighth Schedule to the Constitution of India
- Official Languages Commission
- List of languages by number of native speakers in India

Bal Sahitya Puraskar is given each year to writers for their outstanding works in the 24 languages, since 2010.

== Recipients ==
Following is the list of recipients of Bal Sahitya Puraskar for their works written in Marathi. The award comprises a cash prize of Rs. 50,000 and an engraved copper plaque.

Year	Author	Work	Genre	References
2010	Anil T. Awachat	Srishtit... Goshtit	Short Stories	
2011	Dilip Prabhavalkar	Bokya Satbande	Short Stories	
2012	Baba Bhand	Total Contribution to Children's Literature		
2013	Anant Bhave	Total Contribution to Children's Literature		
2014	Madhuri Purandare	Total Contribution to Children's Literature		
2015	Leeladhar Hegde	Total Contribution to Children's Literature		
2016	Rajiv Tambe	Total Contribution to Children's Literature		
2017	L.M. Kadu	Kharicha Vata	Novel	
2018	Ratnakar Matkari	Total Contribution to Children's Literature		
2019	Salim Sardar Mulla	Jangal Khajinyacha Shodh	Novel	
2020	Aba Mahajan	Abachi Gosht	Short Stories	
2021	Sanjay Wagh	Jokar Banala Kingmaker	Novel	
2022	Sangeeta Barve	Piyuchi Vahi	Novel	
2023	Eknath Avhad	Chhand Dei Aanand	Poetry	
2024	Bharat Sasane	Samsher Aani Bhootbangala	Novel	
2025	Suresh Sawant	Aabhalmaya	Poetry	

== See also ==
- List of Sahitya Akademi Award winners for Marathi
