= List of Yuva Puraskar winners for Nepali =

List of winners of a literary honor in India

Yuva Puraskar
- Awarded for: Contribution to Indian literature in Nepali language
- Sponsored by: Sahitya Akademi (Government of India)
- Reward: ₹ 50,000
- First award: 2011
- Final award: 2020

Highlights
- Total: 12
- First winner: Kamal Regmi (2011)
- Latest winner: Roshan Rai 'Chot' (2022)
- Website: Official website

Part of a series on

Sahitya Akademi Awards
Category
Sahitya Akademi Award winners by language
- Assamese
- Bengali
- Bodo
- Dogri
- English
- Gujarati
- Hindi
- Kannada
- Kashmiri
- Konkani
- Maithili
- Malayalam
- Marathi
- Meitei (Manipuri)
- Nepali
- Odia
- Punjabi
- Rajasthani
- Sanskrit
- Santali
- Sindhi
- Tamil
- Telugu
- Urdu
Sahitya Akademi Translation Prizes
- Assamese
- Bengali
- Bodo
- Dogri
- English
- Gujarati
- Hindi
- Kannada
- Kashmiri
- Konkani
- Maithili
- Malayalam
- Marathi
- Meitei (Manipuri)
- Nepali
- Odia
- Punjabi
- Rajasthani
- Sanskrit
- Santali
- Sindhi
- Tamil
- Telugu
- Urdu
Sahitya Akademi Yuva Puraskar
- Assamese
- Bengali
- Bodo
- Dogri
- English
- Gujarati
- Hindi
- Kannada
- Kashmiri
- Konkani
- Maithili
- Malayalam
- Meitei (Manipuri)
- Marathi
- Nepali
- Odia
- Punjabi
- Rajasthani
- Sanskrit
- Santali
- Sindhi
- Tamil
- Telugu
- Urdu
Sahitya Akademi Bal Sahitya Puraskar
- Assamese
- Bengali
- Bodo
- Dogri
- English
- Gujarati
- Hindi
- Kannada
- Kashmiri
- Konkani
- Maithili
- Malayalam
- Meitei (Manipuri)
- Marathi
- Nepali
- Odia
- Punjabi
- Rajasthani
- Sanskrit
- Santali
- Sindhi
- Tamil
- Telugu
- Urdu
Related
- Eighth Schedule to the Constitution of India
- Official Languages Commission
- List of languages by number of native speakers in India

Yuva Puraskar (Nepali: युवा पुरस्कार, lit. 'Youth Award') relates to books published by an author of the age of 35 and below as on 1 January of the year of the award. This is a list of Nepali writers who received the award given by Sahitya Akademi.

== Recipients ==
Following are the recipients:

Year	Author	Work	Type of work	Notes
2025	Subash Thakuri	Junko Aansu	Poetry	
2024	Suraj Chapagain	Canvas Ko Xitiz	Novel	
2023	Naina Adhikari	Ghat-Pratighatka Udgarharu	Poetry	
2022	Roshan Rai 'Chot'	Deshko Anuhar	Poetry	
2021	Mahesh Dahal	Achal Kuhiro	Short Stories	
2020	Anjan Baskota	Dristi- Nibandha Sangrah	Essays	
2019	Karna Biraha	Charkiyeko Bhui	Poetry	
2018	Chuden Kabimo	1986	Short Stories	
2017	Sharan Muskan 'Garud'	Mooldharatira	Poetry	
2016	Sanjeev Chhetri	Sancho Jastai Kathaharu	Short Stories	
2015	Sapan Pradhan	Kriti-Kirti	Literary Criticism	
2014	Tika 'Bhai'	Paitalataltira	Poetry	
2013	Suraj Dhadkan	Ghar	Short Stories	
2012	Manoj Bogati	Ghauka Rang Haru	Poetry	
2011	Kamal Regmi	Srijana Ra Abhista	Poetry	

== See also ==
- List of Sahitya Akademi Award winners for Nepali
- Yuva Puraskar
