= List of Yuva Puraskar winners for Telugu =

List of winners of a literary honor in India

Part of a series on

Sahitya Akademi Awards
Category
Sahitya Akademi Award winners by language
- Assamese
- Bengali
- Bodo
- Dogri
- English
- Gujarati
- Hindi
- Kannada
- Kashmiri
- Konkani
- Maithili
- Malayalam
- Marathi
- Meitei (Manipuri)
- Nepali
- Odia
- Punjabi
- Rajasthani
- Sanskrit
- Santali
- Sindhi
- Tamil
- Telugu
- Urdu
Sahitya Akademi Translation Prizes
- Assamese
- Bengali
- Bodo
- Dogri
- English
- Gujarati
- Hindi
- Kannada
- Kashmiri
- Konkani
- Maithili
- Malayalam
- Marathi
- Meitei (Manipuri)
- Nepali
- Odia
- Punjabi
- Rajasthani
- Sanskrit
- Santali
- Sindhi
- Tamil
- Telugu
- Urdu
Sahitya Akademi Yuva Puraskar
- Assamese
- Bengali
- Bodo
- Dogri
- English
- Gujarati
- Hindi
- Kannada
- Kashmiri
- Konkani
- Maithili
- Malayalam
- Meitei (Manipuri)
- Marathi
- Nepali
- Odia
- Punjabi
- Rajasthani
- Sanskrit
- Santali
- Sindhi
- Tamil
- Telugu
- Urdu
Sahitya Akademi Bal Sahitya Puraskar
- Assamese
- Bengali
- Bodo
- Dogri
- English
- Gujarati
- Hindi
- Kannada
- Kashmiri
- Konkani
- Maithili
- Malayalam
- Meitei (Manipuri)
- Marathi
- Nepali
- Odia
- Punjabi
- Rajasthani
- Sanskrit
- Santali
- Sindhi
- Tamil
- Telugu
- Urdu
Related
- Eighth Schedule to the Constitution of India
- Official Languages Commission
- List of languages by number of native speakers in India

Yuva Puraskar is given each year to young writers for their outstanding works in the 24 languages, since 2011.

== Recipients ==
Following is the list of recipients of Yuva Puraskar for their works written in Telugu. The award comprises a cash prize of Rs. 50,000 and an engraved copper plaque.

Year	Author	Work	Type of work	Reference
2011	Vempalli Gangadhar	Molakala Punnami	Short Stories	
2012	Vempalli Shariff	Jumma	Short Stories	
2013	Manthri Krishna Mohan	Pravahinche Padalu and other Poems	Poetry	
2014	Appireddy Harinaatha Reddy	Seema Sahithi Swaram Sri Sadhana Patrika	Essays	
2015	Pasunoori Ravinder	Out of Coverage Area	Short Stories	
2016	Pingali Chaitanya	Chittagong Viplava vanithalu	Short Stories	
2017	Mercy Margaret	Matala Madugu	Poetry	
2018	Bala Sudhakar Mauli	Aku Kadalani Chota	Poetry	
2019	Gaddam Mohan Rao	Kongavalu Kathi	Novel	
2020	Manasa Yendluri	Milinda	Short Stories	
2021	Thagulla Gopal	Dandakadiyam	Poetry	
2022	Pallipattu Nagaraju	Yelai Pudisindi	Poetry	
2023	Johny Takkedasila	Vivechani	Criticism	
2024	Ramesh Karthik Nayak	Dhaavlo	Short Stories	
2025	Prasad Suri	Mairaavana	Novel	

== See also ==
- List of Sahitya Akademi Award winners for Telugu
- List of Sahitya Akademi Translation Prize winners for Telugu
