= List of Yuva Puraskar winners for Maithili =

List of winners of a literary honor in India

Part of a series on

Sahitya Akademi Awards
Category
Sahitya Akademi Award winners by language
- Assamese
- Bengali
- Bodo
- Dogri
- English
- Gujarati
- Hindi
- Kannada
- Kashmiri
- Konkani
- Maithili
- Malayalam
- Marathi
- Meitei (Manipuri)
- Nepali
- Odia
- Punjabi
- Rajasthani
- Sanskrit
- Santali
- Sindhi
- Tamil
- Telugu
- Urdu
Sahitya Akademi Translation Prizes
- Assamese
- Bengali
- Bodo
- Dogri
- English
- Gujarati
- Hindi
- Kannada
- Kashmiri
- Konkani
- Maithili
- Malayalam
- Marathi
- Meitei (Manipuri)
- Nepali
- Odia
- Punjabi
- Rajasthani
- Sanskrit
- Santali
- Sindhi
- Tamil
- Telugu
- Urdu
Sahitya Akademi Yuva Puraskar
- Assamese
- Bengali
- Bodo
- Dogri
- English
- Gujarati
- Hindi
- Kannada
- Kashmiri
- Konkani
- Maithili
- Malayalam
- Meitei (Manipuri)
- Marathi
- Nepali
- Odia
- Punjabi
- Rajasthani
- Sanskrit
- Santali
- Sindhi
- Tamil
- Telugu
- Urdu
Sahitya Akademi Bal Sahitya Puraskar
- Assamese
- Bengali
- Bodo
- Dogri
- English
- Gujarati
- Hindi
- Kannada
- Kashmiri
- Konkani
- Maithili
- Malayalam
- Meitei (Manipuri)
- Marathi
- Nepali
- Odia
- Punjabi
- Rajasthani
- Sanskrit
- Santali
- Sindhi
- Tamil
- Telugu
- Urdu
Related
- Eighth Schedule to the Constitution of India
- Official Languages Commission
- List of languages by number of native speakers in India

Yuva Puraskar is given each year to young writers for their outstanding works in the 24 languages, since 2011.

== Recipients ==
Following is the list of recipients of Yuva Puraskar for their works written in Maithili. The award comprises a cash prize of Rs. 50,000 and an engraved copper plaque.

Year	Author	Work	Genre	References
2011	Anand Kumar Jha	Hathat Parivartan	Play	
2012	Arunabh Saurabh	Etbe Taa Naih	Poetry	
2013	Dilip Kumar Jha 'Lootan'	Ankura Rahal Sangharsh	Poetry	
2014	Praveen Kashyap	Visdanti Varmal Kalak Rati	Poetry	
2015	Narayan Jha	Pratiwadi Ham	Poetry	
2016	Deep Narayan 'Vidyarthi'	Je Kahi Nahi Saklahun	Poetry	
2017	Chandan Kumar Jha	Dhartis Akash Dhari	Poetry	
2018	Umesh Paswan	Varnit Rasa	Poetry	
2019	Amit Pathak	Raag-Upraag	Poetry	
2020	Sonu Kuma Jha	Gassa	Short Stories	
2021	Amit Mishra	Anshu Bani Pasari Jaeb	Poetry	
2022	Navkrishna Aihik	Khurchanbhaik Kachhmachchhi	Satire	
2023	Sanskriti Mishra	Kahbak Achhi Hamra	Poetry	
2024	Rinki Jha Rishika	Nadi Ghati Sabhyata	Poetry	
2025	Neha Jha Mani	Banaras Aa Hum	Poetry	

== See also ==
- List of Sahitya Akademi Award winners for Maithili
- List of Sahitya Akademi Translation Prize winners for Maithili
