= List of Bal Sahitya Puraskar winners for Bengali =

Winners of a literary honour in India

Part of a series on

Sahitya Akademi Awards
Category
Sahitya Akademi Award winners by language
- Assamese
- Bengali
- Bodo
- Dogri
- English
- Gujarati
- Hindi
- Kannada
- Kashmiri
- Konkani
- Maithili
- Malayalam
- Marathi
- Meitei (Manipuri)
- Nepali
- Odia
- Punjabi
- Rajasthani
- Sanskrit
- Santali
- Sindhi
- Tamil
- Telugu
- Urdu
Sahitya Akademi Translation Prizes
- Assamese
- Bengali
- Bodo
- Dogri
- English
- Gujarati
- Hindi
- Kannada
- Kashmiri
- Konkani
- Maithili
- Malayalam
- Marathi
- Meitei (Manipuri)
- Nepali
- Odia
- Punjabi
- Rajasthani
- Sanskrit
- Santali
- Sindhi
- Tamil
- Telugu
- Urdu
Sahitya Akademi Yuva Puraskar
- Assamese
- Bengali
- Bodo
- Dogri
- English
- Gujarati
- Hindi
- Kannada
- Kashmiri
- Konkani
- Maithili
- Malayalam
- Meitei (Manipuri)
- Marathi
- Nepali
- Odia
- Punjabi
- Rajasthani
- Sanskrit
- Santali
- Sindhi
- Tamil
- Telugu
- Urdu
Sahitya Akademi Bal Sahitya Puraskar
- Assamese
- Bengali
- Bodo
- Dogri
- English
- Gujarati
- Hindi
- Kannada
- Kashmiri
- Konkani
- Maithili
- Malayalam
- Meitei (Manipuri)
- Marathi
- Nepali
- Odia
- Punjabi
- Rajasthani
- Sanskrit
- Santali
- Sindhi
- Tamil
- Telugu
- Urdu
Related
- Eighth Schedule to the Constitution of India
- Official Languages Commission
- List of languages by number of native speakers in India

Bal Sahitya Puraskar is given each year to writers for their outstanding works in the 24 languages, since 2010.

== Recipients ==
Following is the list of recipients of Bal Sahitya Puraskar for their works written in Bengali. The award comprises a cash prize of Rs. 50,000 and an engraved copper plaque.

Year	Author	Work	Genre	References
2010	Saral Dey	Total Contribution to Children's Literature		
2011	Sailen Ghose	Total Contribution to Children's Literature		
2012	Balaram Basak	Bhaluker Dolna	Short Stories	
2013	Narayan Debnath	Comics Samagra-Vol. 1&2	Short Stories	
2014	Gouri Dharmapal	Total Contribution to Children's Literature		
2015	Kartik Ghosh	Total Contribution to Children's Literature		
2016	Amarendra Chakravorty	Gorillar Chokh	Novel	
2017	Shashthipada Chattopadhyay	Total Contribution to Children's Literature		
2018	Shirshendu Mukhopadhyay	Total Contribution to Children's Literature		
2019	Nabaneeta Dev Sen	Total Contribution to Children's Literature		
2020	Pracheta Gupta	Gopon Bakso Khulte Nei	Short Stories	
2021	Sunirmal Chakraborty	Batakesto Babur Chhata	Short Stories	
2022	Joya Mitra	Char Panch Jon Bondhu	Short Stories	
2023	Shyamal Kanti Das	Eroplaner Khata	Novel	
2024	Dipanwita Roy	Mahidadur Antidote	Novel	
2025	Tridib Kumar Chattopadhyay	Ekhono Gaye Kanta Daye	Stories	

== See also ==
- List of Sahitya Akademi Award winners for Bengali
