= Rishiraj Pathak =

Indian scholar (born 1989)

- Born: 8 March 1989 (age 37); Delhi, India
- Occupation: Assistant Professor
- Parent(s): Narayan Pathak, Sunita Pathak

Rishiraj Pathak (born 8 March 1989; Delhi, India) is an Indian Sanskrit scholar, poet, musician and a dance Litterateur.

In 2020, Pathak received the Yuva Puraskar 2020 from the Sahitya Akademi for the book Aadyonmeshah. He is known to blend tradition with modernity as the author of over a hundred Sanskrit poems.

Pathak produced the documentary film Bharat Ki Awaaz: Acharya Ramakant Shukla, which is directed by Beenu Rajpoot and was released on 10 March 2024.
