= List of Yuva Puraskar winners for Sanskrit =

List of winners of a literary honor in India

Part of a series on

Sahitya Akademi Awards
Category
Sahitya Akademi Award winners by language
- Assamese
- Bengali
- Bodo
- Dogri
- English
- Gujarati
- Hindi
- Kannada
- Kashmiri
- Konkani
- Maithili
- Malayalam
- Marathi
- Meitei (Manipuri)
- Nepali
- Odia
- Punjabi
- Rajasthani
- Sanskrit
- Santali
- Sindhi
- Tamil
- Telugu
- Urdu
Sahitya Akademi Translation Prizes
- Assamese
- Bengali
- Bodo
- Dogri
- English
- Gujarati
- Hindi
- Kannada
- Kashmiri
- Konkani
- Maithili
- Malayalam
- Marathi
- Meitei (Manipuri)
- Nepali
- Odia
- Punjabi
- Rajasthani
- Sanskrit
- Santali
- Sindhi
- Tamil
- Telugu
- Urdu
Sahitya Akademi Yuva Puraskar
- Assamese
- Bengali
- Bodo
- Dogri
- English
- Gujarati
- Hindi
- Kannada
- Kashmiri
- Konkani
- Maithili
- Malayalam
- Meitei (Manipuri)
- Marathi
- Nepali
- Odia
- Punjabi
- Rajasthani
- Sanskrit
- Santali
- Sindhi
- Tamil
- Telugu
- Urdu
Sahitya Akademi Bal Sahitya Puraskar
- Assamese
- Bengali
- Bodo
- Dogri
- English
- Gujarati
- Hindi
- Kannada
- Kashmiri
- Konkani
- Maithili
- Malayalam
- Meitei (Manipuri)
- Marathi
- Nepali
- Odia
- Punjabi
- Rajasthani
- Sanskrit
- Santali
- Sindhi
- Tamil
- Telugu
- Urdu
Related
- Eighth Schedule to the Constitution of India
- Official Languages Commission
- List of languages by number of native speakers in India

Yuva Puraskar is given each year to young writers for their outstanding works in the 24 languages, since 2011.

== Recipients ==
Following is the list of recipients of Yuva Puraskar for their works written in Sanskrit. The award comprises a cash prize of Rs. 50,000 and an engraved copper plaque.

Year	Author	Work	Genre	References
2011	Paramanand Jha	Kavyakaveri	Poetry	
2012	Pravin Pandya	Udbahuvamanta	Poetry	
2013	Raj Kumar Mishra	Bharatabusanam	Poetry	
2014	Paramba Shree Yogamaya	Samparkah	Short Stories	
2015	Rushiraj Jani	Samudre Buddhasya Netre	Poetry	
2016	Bharat Bhusan Rath	Vanavaibhavam	Poetry	
2017	Hemchandra Belwal	Parivartankavyam	Poetry	
2018	Muni Rajsundar Vijay	Chitrakavyadarshanam	Poetry	
2019	Yuvraj Bhattarai	Vagvilasini	Poetry	
2020	Rishiraj Pathak	Aadhyonmeshah	Poetry	
2021	Swetapadma Satapathy	Kathakalpalata	Short Stories	
2022	Shruti Kanitkar	Shreemati Charitram	Poetry	
2023	Madhusudan Mishra	Sudarshanvijayam	Prose	
2025	Dheeraj Kumar Pandey	Paribhashikshabd-swarasyam (vedantparibhashasandarbhe)	Criticism	

== See also ==
- List of Sahitya Akademi Award winners for Sanskrit
- List of Sahitya Akademi Translation Prize winners for Sanskrit
