= List of Yuva Puraskar winners for Bodo =

List of winners of a literary honor in India

Part of a series on

Sahitya Akademi Awards
Category
Sahitya Akademi Award winners by language
- Assamese
- Bengali
- Bodo
- Dogri
- English
- Gujarati
- Hindi
- Kannada
- Kashmiri
- Konkani
- Maithili
- Malayalam
- Marathi
- Meitei (Manipuri)
- Nepali
- Odia
- Punjabi
- Rajasthani
- Sanskrit
- Santali
- Sindhi
- Tamil
- Telugu
- Urdu
Sahitya Akademi Translation Prizes
- Assamese
- Bengali
- Bodo
- Dogri
- English
- Gujarati
- Hindi
- Kannada
- Kashmiri
- Konkani
- Maithili
- Malayalam
- Marathi
- Meitei (Manipuri)
- Nepali
- Odia
- Punjabi
- Rajasthani
- Sanskrit
- Santali
- Sindhi
- Tamil
- Telugu
- Urdu
Sahitya Akademi Yuva Puraskar
- Assamese
- Bengali
- Bodo
- Dogri
- English
- Gujarati
- Hindi
- Kannada
- Kashmiri
- Konkani
- Maithili
- Malayalam
- Meitei (Manipuri)
- Marathi
- Nepali
- Odia
- Punjabi
- Rajasthani
- Sanskrit
- Santali
- Sindhi
- Tamil
- Telugu
- Urdu
Sahitya Akademi Bal Sahitya Puraskar
- Assamese
- Bengali
- Bodo
- Dogri
- English
- Gujarati
- Hindi
- Kannada
- Kashmiri
- Konkani
- Maithili
- Malayalam
- Meitei (Manipuri)
- Marathi
- Nepali
- Odia
- Punjabi
- Rajasthani
- Sanskrit
- Santali
- Sindhi
- Tamil
- Telugu
- Urdu
Related
- Eighth Schedule to the Constitution of India
- Official Languages Commission
- List of languages by number of native speakers in India

Yuva Puraskar is given each year to young writers for their outstanding works in the 24 languages, since 2011.

== Recipients ==
Following is the list of recipients of Yuva Puraskar for their works written in Bodo. The award comprises a cash prize of Rs. 50,000 and an engraved copper plaque.

| Year | Author | Work | Type of Work | Reference |
|---|---|---|---|---|
| 2011 | Jaishree Baro | Jeu Saharani Beduin | Short story | |
| 2012 | Diganta Lawary | Mijingao Swmkhe Jwmwi | Novel | |
| 2013 | Sansumwi Khungri Basumatary | Felengni Saogari | Novel | |
| 2014 | Shanti Basumatary | Thwinikhruibw Gwjasin Nwngni Gaba | Poetry | |
| 2015 | Leben Lal Mwshahary | Khwmsi Harni Alari | Short stories | |
| 2016 | Bijit Gayari | Khamflongnai Bubli | Poetry | |
| 2017 | Bijit Gwra Ramchiary | Gwrbwni Aroj | Poetry | |
| 2018 | Purna Brahma | Onnaini Gubun Mwnsse Mohor | Short Stories | |
| 2019 | Rujab Muchahary | Sansri Arw Mwndangthini Mwkhang | Poetry | |
| 2020 | Newton K. Basumatary | Abwi-Abou Arw Ang | Poetry | |
| 2021 | Rujab Muchahary | Sansri Arw Mwndangthini Mwkhang | Poetry | |
| 2022 | Rujab Muchahary | Sansri Arw Mwndangthini Mwkhang | Poetry | |
| 2023 | Mainaosri Daimary | Som, Jiu, Arw... | Poetry | |
| 2024 | Rani Baro | Saikhlum | Short stories | |
| 2025 | Amar Khungur Boro | Ang Asur | Poetry | |

== See also ==
- List of Sahitya Akademi Award winners for Bodo
- List of Sahitya Akademi Translation Prize winners for Bodo
