= List of Bal Sahitya Puraskar winners for Rajasthani =

Winners of a literary honour in India

Part of a series on

Sahitya Akademi Awards
Category
Sahitya Akademi Award winners by language
- Assamese
- Bengali
- Bodo
- Dogri
- English
- Gujarati
- Hindi
- Kannada
- Kashmiri
- Konkani
- Maithili
- Malayalam
- Marathi
- Meitei (Manipuri)
- Nepali
- Odia
- Punjabi
- Rajasthani
- Sanskrit
- Santali
- Sindhi
- Tamil
- Telugu
- Urdu
Sahitya Akademi Translation Prizes
- Assamese
- Bengali
- Bodo
- Dogri
- English
- Gujarati
- Hindi
- Kannada
- Kashmiri
- Konkani
- Maithili
- Malayalam
- Marathi
- Meitei (Manipuri)
- Nepali
- Odia
- Punjabi
- Rajasthani
- Sanskrit
- Santali
- Sindhi
- Tamil
- Telugu
- Urdu
Sahitya Akademi Yuva Puraskar
- Assamese
- Bengali
- Bodo
- Dogri
- English
- Gujarati
- Hindi
- Kannada
- Kashmiri
- Konkani
- Maithili
- Malayalam
- Meitei (Manipuri)
- Marathi
- Nepali
- Odia
- Punjabi
- Rajasthani
- Sanskrit
- Santali
- Sindhi
- Tamil
- Telugu
- Urdu
Sahitya Akademi Bal Sahitya Puraskar
- Assamese
- Bengali
- Bodo
- Dogri
- English
- Gujarati
- Hindi
- Kannada
- Kashmiri
- Konkani
- Maithili
- Malayalam
- Meitei (Manipuri)
- Marathi
- Nepali
- Odia
- Punjabi
- Rajasthani
- Sanskrit
- Santali
- Sindhi
- Tamil
- Telugu
- Urdu
Related
- Eighth Schedule to the Constitution of India
- Official Languages Commission
- List of languages by number of native speakers in India

Bal Sahitya Puraskar is given each year to writers for their outstanding works in the 24 languages, since 2010.

== Recipients ==
Following is the list of recipients of Bal Sahitya Puraskar for their works written in Rajasthani. The award comprises a cash prize of Rs. 50,000 and an engraved copper plaque.

Year	Author	Work	Genre	References
2010	Damyanti Jadawat 'Chanchal'	Bulbul Ra Bol	Short Story	
2011	Hariish B. Sharma	Satoliyo	Short Stories	
2012	Deendayal Sharma	Baalpane Ri Baatan	Essays	
2013	Vimla Bhandari	Anmol Bhent	Stories	
2014	Neeraj Dahiya	Jaadoo Ro Pen	Stories	
2015	Krishnakumar 'Aashu'	Dharti Ro Mol	Stories	
2016	NO AWARD			
2017	Pawan Pahadia	Number One Aoola	Poetry	
2018	C. L. Sankhla	Chada Chadi Ki Kheti	Short Stories	
2019	NO AWARD			
2020	Mangat Badal	Kudrat Ro Nyav	Poetry	
2021	Kirti Sharma	Paani Ra Rukhalaa	Novel	
2022	Vishwamitra Dadhich	Machhlyan Ra Aanshu	Poetry	
2023	Kiran Badal	Tabran Ri Duniya	Memoir	
2024	Prahlad Singh 'Jhorda'	Mhari Dhani	Poetry	
2025	Bhogilal Patidar	Pankheruvan Ni Pira	Drama	

== See also ==
- List of Sahitya Akademi Award winners for Rajasthani
