= List of Yuva Puraskar winners for Rajasthani =

List of winners of a literary honor in India

Part of a series on

Sahitya Akademi Awards
Category
Sahitya Akademi Award winners by language
- Assamese
- Bengali
- Bodo
- Dogri
- English
- Gujarati
- Hindi
- Kannada
- Kashmiri
- Konkani
- Maithili
- Malayalam
- Marathi
- Meitei (Manipuri)
- Nepali
- Odia
- Punjabi
- Rajasthani
- Sanskrit
- Santali
- Sindhi
- Tamil
- Telugu
- Urdu
Sahitya Akademi Translation Prizes
- Assamese
- Bengali
- Bodo
- Dogri
- English
- Gujarati
- Hindi
- Kannada
- Kashmiri
- Konkani
- Maithili
- Malayalam
- Marathi
- Meitei (Manipuri)
- Nepali
- Odia
- Punjabi
- Rajasthani
- Sanskrit
- Santali
- Sindhi
- Tamil
- Telugu
- Urdu
Sahitya Akademi Yuva Puraskar
- Assamese
- Bengali
- Bodo
- Dogri
- English
- Gujarati
- Hindi
- Kannada
- Kashmiri
- Konkani
- Maithili
- Malayalam
- Meitei (Manipuri)
- Marathi
- Nepali
- Odia
- Punjabi
- Rajasthani
- Sanskrit
- Santali
- Sindhi
- Tamil
- Telugu
- Urdu
Sahitya Akademi Bal Sahitya Puraskar
- Assamese
- Bengali
- Bodo
- Dogri
- English
- Gujarati
- Hindi
- Kannada
- Kashmiri
- Konkani
- Maithili
- Malayalam
- Meitei (Manipuri)
- Marathi
- Nepali
- Odia
- Punjabi
- Rajasthani
- Sanskrit
- Santali
- Sindhi
- Tamil
- Telugu
- Urdu
Related
- Eighth Schedule to the Constitution of India
- Official Languages Commission
- List of languages by number of native speakers in India

Yuva Puraskar is given each year to young writers for their outstanding works in the 24 languages, since 2011.

== Recipients ==
Following is the list of recipients of Yuva Puraskar for their works written in Rajasthani. The award comprises a cash prize of Rs. 50,000 and an engraved copper plaque.

Year	Author	Work	Genre	References
2011	Dula Ram Saharan	Peer	Short Stories	
2012	Om Nagar	Jad Bi Mandaban Baithun Chun Kavita	Poetry	
2013	Kumar Ajay	Sanjeevanee	Poetry	
2014	Raju Ram Bijarniyan 'Raj'	Chal Bhatooliya Ret Rama	Poetry	
2015	Ritupriya	Sapna Sanjovati Heeran	Short Stories	
2016	Jitendra Kumar Soni	Rankhaar	Poetry	
2017	Ummed Dhaniya	Lebel	Short Stories	
2018	Dushyant Joshi	Ekar Aajya Re Chand	Novel	
2019	Keerti Parihar	Saglaan Ro Seer	Short Stories	
2020	Mahendra Singh Sisodiya ‘Chhayan’	Inn Dharati Re Ujal Aangan	Poetry	
2021	No Award			
2022	Aashish Purohit	Aainnan	Poetry	
2023	Devilal Mahiya	Antas Ro Olmo	Poetry	
2024	Sonali Suthar	Sudh Sodhun Jag Angane	Poetry	
2025	Poonam Chand Godara	Antas re aanganai	Poetry	

== See also ==
- List of Sahitya Akademi Award winners for Rajasthani
- List of Sahitya Akademi Translation Prize winners for Rajasthani
