= List of Yuva Puraskar winners for Kashmiri =

List of winners of a literary honor in India

Part of a series on

Sahitya Akademi Awards
Category
Sahitya Akademi Award winners by language
- Assamese
- Bengali
- Bodo
- Dogri
- English
- Gujarati
- Hindi
- Kannada
- Kashmiri
- Konkani
- Maithili
- Malayalam
- Marathi
- Meitei (Manipuri)
- Nepali
- Odia
- Punjabi
- Rajasthani
- Sanskrit
- Santali
- Sindhi
- Tamil
- Telugu
- Urdu
Sahitya Akademi Translation Prizes
- Assamese
- Bengali
- Bodo
- Dogri
- English
- Gujarati
- Hindi
- Kannada
- Kashmiri
- Konkani
- Maithili
- Malayalam
- Marathi
- Meitei (Manipuri)
- Nepali
- Odia
- Punjabi
- Rajasthani
- Sanskrit
- Santali
- Sindhi
- Tamil
- Telugu
- Urdu
Sahitya Akademi Yuva Puraskar
- Assamese
- Bengali
- Bodo
- Dogri
- English
- Gujarati
- Hindi
- Kannada
- Kashmiri
- Konkani
- Maithili
- Malayalam
- Meitei (Manipuri)
- Marathi
- Nepali
- Odia
- Punjabi
- Rajasthani
- Sanskrit
- Santali
- Sindhi
- Tamil
- Telugu
- Urdu
Sahitya Akademi Bal Sahitya Puraskar
- Assamese
- Bengali
- Bodo
- Dogri
- English
- Gujarati
- Hindi
- Kannada
- Kashmiri
- Konkani
- Maithili
- Malayalam
- Meitei (Manipuri)
- Marathi
- Nepali
- Odia
- Punjabi
- Rajasthani
- Sanskrit
- Santali
- Sindhi
- Tamil
- Telugu
- Urdu
Related
- Eighth Schedule to the Constitution of India
- Official Languages Commission
- List of languages by number of native speakers in India

Yuva Puraskar is given each year to young writers for their outstanding works in the 24 languages, since 2011.

== Recipients ==
Following is the list of recipients of Yuva Puraskar for their works written in Kashmiri. The award comprises a cash prize of Rs. 50,000 and an engraved copper plaque.

| Year | Author | Work | Genre | References |
|---|---|---|---|---|
| 2011 | Nisar Azam | Patte Leji Zoon Daras | Poetry | |
| 2012 | Farooq Shaheen | Gashe Malar | Literary Criticism | |
| 2013 | Saba Shaheen | Vola Kael Ravay | Poetry | |
| 2014 | No Award | | | |
| 2015 | No Award | | | |
| 2016 | Aadil Mohi-ud-din | Zol Dith Sadras | Criticism | |
| 2017 | Nighat Sahiba | Zard Panike Dair | Poetry | |
| 2018 | Dheeba Nazir | Za’reen Zakham | Short Stories | |
| 2019 | Sagar Nazir | Thaer Angnech | Poetry | |
| 2020 | Muzaffar Ahmad Parray | Wavech Baavath | Poetry | |
| 2021 | Razi Tahir Bhagat | Yele Aene Phut | Short Stories | |
| 2022 | Shaista Khan | Brande Baras Peth | Short Stories | |
| 2023 | Nighat Nasreen | Lalli Nilvath Tchalli Na Zanh | Poetry | |
| 2024 | Mohd. Ashraf Ziya | Aene Baedas | Articles | |
| 2025 | Saiqa Sehar | Harfas Harfas Zaag | Criticism | |

== See also ==
- List of Sahitya Akademi Award winners for Kashmiri
- List of Sahitya Akademi Translation Prize winners for Kashmiri
