= List of Yuva Puraskar winners for Urdu =

List of winners of a literary honor in India

Part of a series on

Sahitya Akademi Awards
Category
Sahitya Akademi Award winners by language
- Assamese
- Bengali
- Bodo
- Dogri
- English
- Gujarati
- Hindi
- Kannada
- Kashmiri
- Konkani
- Maithili
- Malayalam
- Marathi
- Meitei (Manipuri)
- Nepali
- Odia
- Punjabi
- Rajasthani
- Sanskrit
- Santali
- Sindhi
- Tamil
- Telugu
- Urdu
Sahitya Akademi Translation Prizes
- Assamese
- Bengali
- Bodo
- Dogri
- English
- Gujarati
- Hindi
- Kannada
- Kashmiri
- Konkani
- Maithili
- Malayalam
- Marathi
- Meitei (Manipuri)
- Nepali
- Odia
- Punjabi
- Rajasthani
- Sanskrit
- Santali
- Sindhi
- Tamil
- Telugu
- Urdu
Sahitya Akademi Yuva Puraskar
- Assamese
- Bengali
- Bodo
- Dogri
- English
- Gujarati
- Hindi
- Kannada
- Kashmiri
- Konkani
- Maithili
- Malayalam
- Meitei (Manipuri)
- Marathi
- Nepali
- Odia
- Punjabi
- Rajasthani
- Sanskrit
- Santali
- Sindhi
- Tamil
- Telugu
- Urdu
Sahitya Akademi Bal Sahitya Puraskar
- Assamese
- Bengali
- Bodo
- Dogri
- English
- Gujarati
- Hindi
- Kannada
- Kashmiri
- Konkani
- Maithili
- Malayalam
- Meitei (Manipuri)
- Marathi
- Nepali
- Odia
- Punjabi
- Rajasthani
- Sanskrit
- Santali
- Sindhi
- Tamil
- Telugu
- Urdu
Related
- Eighth Schedule to the Constitution of India
- Official Languages Commission
- List of languages by number of native speakers in India

Yuva Puraskar is given each year to young writers for their outstanding works in the 24 languages, since 2011.

== Recipients ==
Following is the list of recipients of Yuva Puraskar for their works written in Urdu. The award comprises a cash prize of Rs. 50,000 and an engraved copper plaque.

Year	Author	Work	Genre	References
2011	Vishal Khullar	Dhund Mein Amaan		
2012	Ghazanfar Iqbal	Mani-E-Mazmoon	Essays	
2013	Moid Rasheedi	Takhleeq Takheel Aur Isteara	Literary Criticism	
2014	Iltefat Amjadi	Chikne Paat	Poetry	
2015	Ameer Imam	Naqsh-E-Pa Hawaon Ke	Poetry	
2016	Abdus Sami	Nagri Nagri Phira Musafir Devendra Satyarthi: Shakhsiyat Aur Aasaar	Literary Criticism	
2017	Rasheed Ashraf Khan	Maulana Mohammed Husain Azad Aur Unka Shairi Safar	Biography	
2018	Shahnaz Rahman	Nairang-E-Junoon	Short Stories	
2019	Salman Abdus Samad	Lafzon Ka Lahoo	Novel	
2020	Saquib Faridi	Main Apni Baat Ka Mafhoom Dusra Chahun : Bani Ki Shairi ka Motalea	Literary Criticism	
2021	Umar Farhat	Zameen Zaad	Poetry	
2022	Maqsood Aafaque	Giryah	Poetry	
2023	Tauseef Bareilvi	Zahan Zaad	Short Stories	
2024	Javed Amber Misbahi	Stepney	Short Stories	
2025	Neha Rubab	Mazharul Haque: Thareek-e-Azadi-e-Hind: Hind Ka Faramosh Kardah Qaaed	Novel	

== See also ==
- List of Sahitya Akademi Award winners for Urdu
- List of Sahitya Akademi Translation Prize winners for Urdu
