= List of Yuva Puraskar winners for Odia =

List of winners of a literary honor in India

Part of a series on

Sahitya Akademi Awards
Category
Sahitya Akademi Award winners by language
- Assamese
- Bengali
- Bodo
- Dogri
- English
- Gujarati
- Hindi
- Kannada
- Kashmiri
- Konkani
- Maithili
- Malayalam
- Marathi
- Meitei (Manipuri)
- Nepali
- Odia
- Punjabi
- Rajasthani
- Sanskrit
- Santali
- Sindhi
- Tamil
- Telugu
- Urdu
Sahitya Akademi Translation Prizes
- Assamese
- Bengali
- Bodo
- Dogri
- English
- Gujarati
- Hindi
- Kannada
- Kashmiri
- Konkani
- Maithili
- Malayalam
- Marathi
- Meitei (Manipuri)
- Nepali
- Odia
- Punjabi
- Rajasthani
- Sanskrit
- Santali
- Sindhi
- Tamil
- Telugu
- Urdu
Sahitya Akademi Yuva Puraskar
- Assamese
- Bengali
- Bodo
- Dogri
- English
- Gujarati
- Hindi
- Kannada
- Kashmiri
- Konkani
- Maithili
- Malayalam
- Meitei (Manipuri)
- Marathi
- Nepali
- Odia
- Punjabi
- Rajasthani
- Sanskrit
- Santali
- Sindhi
- Tamil
- Telugu
- Urdu
Sahitya Akademi Bal Sahitya Puraskar
- Assamese
- Bengali
- Bodo
- Dogri
- English
- Gujarati
- Hindi
- Kannada
- Kashmiri
- Konkani
- Maithili
- Malayalam
- Meitei (Manipuri)
- Marathi
- Nepali
- Odia
- Punjabi
- Rajasthani
- Sanskrit
- Santali
- Sindhi
- Tamil
- Telugu
- Urdu
Related
- Eighth Schedule to the Constitution of India
- Official Languages Commission
- List of languages by number of native speakers in India

Yuva Puraskar is given each year to young writers for their outstanding works in the 24 languages, since 2011.

== Recipients ==
Following is the list of recipients of Yuva Puraskar for their works written in Odia. The award comprises a cash prize of Rs. 50,000 and an engraved copper plaque.

Year	Author	Work	Genre	References
2011	Gayatribala Panda	Gaan	Poetry	
2012	Srushthishree Naik	Bhirna Upabana	Short Stories	
2013	Kshetrabasi Naik	Dadan	Short Stories	
2014	Narendra Kumar Bhoi	Pidaparba	Poetry	
2015	Sujit Kumar Panda	Manasanka	Short Stories	
2016	Jnanee Debasish Mishra	Daaga	Poetry	
2017	Suryasnata Tripathy	E Sampark Emiti	Poetry	
2018	Jayadratha Suna	Sosa	Poetry	
2019	Sisira Behera	Bimugdha Uccharana	Literary Criticism	
2020	Chandrasekhar Hota	Chetanara Anwesana	Essays	
2021	Debabrata Das	Sparsha O Anyanya Galpa	Short Stories	
2022	Dillip Behera	Lanthan	Short Stories	
2023	Dileswar Rana	Senrra	Short Stories	
2024	Sanjay Kumar Panda	Hu Baieaa	Short Stories	
2025	Subrat Kumar Senapati	Kadambabana	Short Stories	

== See also ==
- List of Sahitya Akademi Award winners for Odia
- List of Sahitya Akademi Translation Prize winners for Odia
