= List of Bal Sahitya Puraskar winners for Hindi =

Winners of a literary honour in India

Part of a series on

Sahitya Akademi Awards
Category
Sahitya Akademi Award winners by language
- Assamese
- Bengali
- Bodo
- Dogri
- English
- Gujarati
- Hindi
- Kannada
- Kashmiri
- Konkani
- Maithili
- Malayalam
- Marathi
- Meitei (Manipuri)
- Nepali
- Odia
- Punjabi
- Rajasthani
- Sanskrit
- Santali
- Sindhi
- Tamil
- Telugu
- Urdu
Sahitya Akademi Translation Prizes
- Assamese
- Bengali
- Bodo
- Dogri
- English
- Gujarati
- Hindi
- Kannada
- Kashmiri
- Konkani
- Maithili
- Malayalam
- Marathi
- Meitei (Manipuri)
- Nepali
- Odia
- Punjabi
- Rajasthani
- Sanskrit
- Santali
- Sindhi
- Tamil
- Telugu
- Urdu
Sahitya Akademi Yuva Puraskar
- Assamese
- Bengali
- Bodo
- Dogri
- English
- Gujarati
- Hindi
- Kannada
- Kashmiri
- Konkani
- Maithili
- Malayalam
- Meitei (Manipuri)
- Marathi
- Nepali
- Odia
- Punjabi
- Rajasthani
- Sanskrit
- Santali
- Sindhi
- Tamil
- Telugu
- Urdu
Sahitya Akademi Bal Sahitya Puraskar
- Assamese
- Bengali
- Bodo
- Dogri
- English
- Gujarati
- Hindi
- Kannada
- Kashmiri
- Konkani
- Maithili
- Malayalam
- Meitei (Manipuri)
- Marathi
- Nepali
- Odia
- Punjabi
- Rajasthani
- Sanskrit
- Santali
- Sindhi
- Tamil
- Telugu
- Urdu
Related
- Eighth Schedule to the Constitution of India
- Official Languages Commission
- List of languages by number of native speakers in India

Bal Sahitya Puraskar is given each year to writers for their outstanding works in the 24 languages, since 2010.

== Recipients ==
Following is the list of recipients of Bal Sahitya Puraskar for their works written in Hindi. The award comprises a cash prize of Rs. 50,000 and an engraved copper plaque.

Year	Author	Work	Genre	References
2010	Prakash Manu	Ek Tha Thunthuniya	Novel	
2011	Hari Krishna Devsare	Total Contribution to Children's Literature		
2012	Balashouri Reddy	Total Contribution to Children's Literature		
2013	Ramesh Tailang	Total Contribution to Children's Literature		
2014	Dinesh Chamola 'Shailesh'	Mere Priya Baalgeet	Poetry	
2015	Sherjang Garg	Total Contribution to Children's Literature		
2016	Droan Vir Kohli	Mataki Mataka Matkaina	Novel	
2017	Sri Swayamprakash	Pyare Bahi Ramsahay	Short Stories	
2018	Divik Ramesh	Mere Man Ki Bal Kahaniyan	Short Stories	
2019	Govind Sharma	Kachu Ki Topi	Stories	
2020	Balswaroop Rahi	Sampurna Bal Kavitayen	Poetry	
2021	Devendra Mewari	Natak Natak me Vigyan	Play	
2022	Kshama Sharma	Kshama Sharma ki Chuninda Baal Kahaniyan	Short Stories	
2023	Suryanath Singh	Kotuk App	Short Stories	
2024	Devender Kumar	51 Baal Kahaniyan	Stories	
2025	Sushil Shukla	Ek Batey Bara	Short Stories	

== See also ==
- List of Sahitya Akademi Award winners for Hindi
