= List of Bal Sahitya Puraskar winners for Urdu =

Winners of a literary honour in India

Part of a series on

Sahitya Akademi Awards
Category
Sahitya Akademi Award winners by language
- Assamese
- Bengali
- Bodo
- Dogri
- English
- Gujarati
- Hindi
- Kannada
- Kashmiri
- Konkani
- Maithili
- Malayalam
- Marathi
- Meitei (Manipuri)
- Nepali
- Odia
- Punjabi
- Rajasthani
- Sanskrit
- Santali
- Sindhi
- Tamil
- Telugu
- Urdu
Sahitya Akademi Translation Prizes
- Assamese
- Bengali
- Bodo
- Dogri
- English
- Gujarati
- Hindi
- Kannada
- Kashmiri
- Konkani
- Maithili
- Malayalam
- Marathi
- Meitei (Manipuri)
- Nepali
- Odia
- Punjabi
- Rajasthani
- Sanskrit
- Santali
- Sindhi
- Tamil
- Telugu
- Urdu
Sahitya Akademi Yuva Puraskar
- Assamese
- Bengali
- Bodo
- Dogri
- English
- Gujarati
- Hindi
- Kannada
- Kashmiri
- Konkani
- Maithili
- Malayalam
- Meitei (Manipuri)
- Marathi
- Nepali
- Odia
- Punjabi
- Rajasthani
- Sanskrit
- Santali
- Sindhi
- Tamil
- Telugu
- Urdu
Sahitya Akademi Bal Sahitya Puraskar
- Assamese
- Bengali
- Bodo
- Dogri
- English
- Gujarati
- Hindi
- Kannada
- Kashmiri
- Konkani
- Maithili
- Malayalam
- Meitei (Manipuri)
- Marathi
- Nepali
- Odia
- Punjabi
- Rajasthani
- Sanskrit
- Santali
- Sindhi
- Tamil
- Telugu
- Urdu
Related
- Eighth Schedule to the Constitution of India
- Official Languages Commission
- List of languages by number of native speakers in India

Bal Sahitya Puraskar is given each year to writers for their outstanding works in the 24 languages, since 2010.

== Recipients ==
Following is the list of recipients of Bal Sahitya Puraskar for their works written in Urdu. The award comprises a cash prize of Rs. 50,000 and an engraved copper plaque.

Year	Author	Work	Genre	References
2010	Syed Ghulam Haider	Akhri Chori aur Doosri Kahaniyan	Short Stories	
2011	Aadil Aseer Dehlavi	Kulliyat-e-Aadil (Vol. 1)	Poetry	
2012	Manazir Aashiq Harganvi	Jaise Ko Taisa	Short Stories	
2013	Asad Raza	Nanhe Munno Ki Sarkar	Stories	
2014	Mahboob Rahi	Rangarang Phulwari	Poetry	
2015	Bano Sartaj	Bachchon Ke Liye Yakbabi Dramey	One Act Play	
2016	Wakeel Najeeb	Masiha	Novel	
2017	Nazeer Fatehpuri	Mera Desh Mahan	Short Stories	
2018	Rais Siddiqui	Batooni Ladki	Short Stories	
2019	Mohammad Khalil	Science ke Dilchasp Mazameen	Stories	
2020	Hafiz Karnataki	Fakhr-E-Watan	Biography	
2021	Kausar Siddiqui	Charagh Phoolon Ke	Poetry	
2022	Zafar Kamali	Hauslon Ki Udan	Poetry	
2023	Mateen Achlpuri	Mamta ki Dor	Short Stories	
2024	Shamsul Islam Farooqi	Barf Ka Des Antarctica	Short Stories	
2025	Ghazanfar Iqbal	Qaumi	Articles	

== See also ==
- List of Sahitya Akademi Award winners for Urdu
