= List of Yuva Puraskar winners for Hindi =

List of winners of a literary honor in India

Part of a series on

Sahitya Akademi Awards
Category
Sahitya Akademi Award winners by language
- Assamese
- Bengali
- Bodo
- Dogri
- English
- Gujarati
- Hindi
- Kannada
- Kashmiri
- Konkani
- Maithili
- Malayalam
- Marathi
- Meitei (Manipuri)
- Nepali
- Odia
- Punjabi
- Rajasthani
- Sanskrit
- Santali
- Sindhi
- Tamil
- Telugu
- Urdu
Sahitya Akademi Translation Prizes
- Assamese
- Bengali
- Bodo
- Dogri
- English
- Gujarati
- Hindi
- Kannada
- Kashmiri
- Konkani
- Maithili
- Malayalam
- Marathi
- Meitei (Manipuri)
- Nepali
- Odia
- Punjabi
- Rajasthani
- Sanskrit
- Santali
- Sindhi
- Tamil
- Telugu
- Urdu
Sahitya Akademi Yuva Puraskar
- Assamese
- Bengali
- Bodo
- Dogri
- English
- Gujarati
- Hindi
- Kannada
- Kashmiri
- Konkani
- Maithili
- Malayalam
- Meitei (Manipuri)
- Marathi
- Nepali
- Odia
- Punjabi
- Rajasthani
- Sanskrit
- Santali
- Sindhi
- Tamil
- Telugu
- Urdu
Sahitya Akademi Bal Sahitya Puraskar
- Assamese
- Bengali
- Bodo
- Dogri
- English
- Gujarati
- Hindi
- Kannada
- Kashmiri
- Konkani
- Maithili
- Malayalam
- Meitei (Manipuri)
- Marathi
- Nepali
- Odia
- Punjabi
- Rajasthani
- Sanskrit
- Santali
- Sindhi
- Tamil
- Telugu
- Urdu
Related
- Eighth Schedule to the Constitution of India
- Official Languages Commission
- List of languages by number of native speakers in India

Yuva Puraskar is given each year to young writers for their outstanding works in the 24 languages, since 2011.

== Recipients ==
Following is the list of recipients of Yuva Puraskar for their works written in Hindi. The award comprises a cash prize of Rs. 50,000 and an engraved copper plaque.

Year	Author	Work	Genre	References
2011	Uma Shankar Choudhary	Kahte Hain Tab Shanshaah So Rahe The	Poetry	
2012	Kunal Singh	Aadigram Upakhyan	Novel	
2013	Archana Bhensare	Kucch Boodhi Udaas Auratein	Poetry	
2014	Kumar Anupam	Barish Mera Ghar Hai	Poetry	
2015	Indira Dangi	Haveli Sanatanpur	Novel	
2016	Nilotpal Mrinal	Dark Horse - Ek Anakahi Dastan	Novel	
2017	Taro Sindik	Aksharo Ki Vinti	Poetry	
2018	Aasteek Vajpeyi	Thartharahat	Poetry	
2019	Anuj Lugun	Baagh Aur Sugna Munda Ki Beti	Poetry	
2020	Ankit Narwal	U.R. Ananthamurti Pratirodh ka Vikalp	Criticism	
2021	Himanshu Vajpai	Kissa Kissa Lucknowa - Lucknow ke Awami Kisse	Short Stories	
2022	Bhagwant Anmol	Pramey	Novel	
2023	Atul Kumar Rai	Chandpur Ki Chanda	Novel	
2024	Gaurav Pandey	Smritiyon Ke Beech Ghiri Hai Prithvi	Poetry	
2025	Parvati Tirkey	Phir Ugna	Poetry	

== See also ==
- List of Sahitya Akademi Award winners for Hindi
- List of Sahitya Akademi Translation Prize winners for Hindi
