= List of Bal Sahitya Puraskar winners for Odia =

Winners of a literary honour in India

Part of a series on

Sahitya Akademi Awards
Category
Sahitya Akademi Award winners by language
- Assamese
- Bengali
- Bodo
- Dogri
- English
- Gujarati
- Hindi
- Kannada
- Kashmiri
- Konkani
- Maithili
- Malayalam
- Marathi
- Meitei (Manipuri)
- Nepali
- Odia
- Punjabi
- Rajasthani
- Sanskrit
- Santali
- Sindhi
- Tamil
- Telugu
- Urdu
Sahitya Akademi Translation Prizes
- Assamese
- Bengali
- Bodo
- Dogri
- English
- Gujarati
- Hindi
- Kannada
- Kashmiri
- Konkani
- Maithili
- Malayalam
- Marathi
- Meitei (Manipuri)
- Nepali
- Odia
- Punjabi
- Rajasthani
- Sanskrit
- Santali
- Sindhi
- Tamil
- Telugu
- Urdu
Sahitya Akademi Yuva Puraskar
- Assamese
- Bengali
- Bodo
- Dogri
- English
- Gujarati
- Hindi
- Kannada
- Kashmiri
- Konkani
- Maithili
- Malayalam
- Meitei (Manipuri)
- Marathi
- Nepali
- Odia
- Punjabi
- Rajasthani
- Sanskrit
- Santali
- Sindhi
- Tamil
- Telugu
- Urdu
Sahitya Akademi Bal Sahitya Puraskar
- Assamese
- Bengali
- Bodo
- Dogri
- English
- Gujarati
- Hindi
- Kannada
- Kashmiri
- Konkani
- Maithili
- Malayalam
- Meitei (Manipuri)
- Marathi
- Nepali
- Odia
- Punjabi
- Rajasthani
- Sanskrit
- Santali
- Sindhi
- Tamil
- Telugu
- Urdu
Related
- Eighth Schedule to the Constitution of India
- Official Languages Commission
- List of languages by number of native speakers in India

Bal Sahitya Puraskar is given each year to writers for their outstanding works in the 24 languages, since 2010.

== Recipients ==
Following is the list of recipients of Bal Sahitya Puraskar for their works written in Odia. The award comprises a cash prize of Rs. 50,000 and an engraved copper plaque.

Year	Author	Work	Genre	References
2010	Punyaprbha Devi	Kuni Goinda	Short Stories	
2011	Maheswar Mohanty	Total Contribution to Children's Literature		
2012	Ram Prasad Mohanty	Total Contribution to Children's Literature		
2013	Nadiya Bihari Mohanty	Total Contribution to Children's Literature		
2014	Dash Benhur	Total Contribution to Children's Literature		
2015	Snehalata Mohanty	Total Contribution to Children's Literature		
2016	Batakrushna Ojha	Total Contribution to Children's Literature		
2017	Subhendra Mohan Srichandan Singh	Total Contribution to Children's Literature		
2018	Birendra Mohanty	Rumku Jhuma	Poetry	
2019	Birendra Kumar Samantray	Total Contribution to Children's Literature		
2020	Ramachandra Nayak	Bana Deula Re Suna Neula	Stories	
2021	Digaraj Brahma	Geeta Kahe Mitar Katha	Poetry	
2022	Narendra Prasad Das	Kolahala Na Halahala	Short Stories	
2023	Jugal Kishore Sarangi	Jejenka Gapa Ganthili	Short Stories	
2024	Manas Ranjan Samal	Gapa Kalika	Short Stories	
2025	Rajkishore Padhi	Kete Phula Phutichhi	Poetry	

== See also ==
- List of Sahitya Akademi Award winners for Odia
