= List of Bal Sahitya Puraskar winners for Sindhi =

Winners of a literary honour in India

Part of a series on

Sahitya Akademi Awards
Category
Sahitya Akademi Award winners by language
- Assamese
- Bengali
- Bodo
- Dogri
- English
- Gujarati
- Hindi
- Kannada
- Kashmiri
- Konkani
- Maithili
- Malayalam
- Marathi
- Meitei (Manipuri)
- Nepali
- Odia
- Punjabi
- Rajasthani
- Sanskrit
- Santali
- Sindhi
- Tamil
- Telugu
- Urdu
Sahitya Akademi Translation Prizes
- Assamese
- Bengali
- Bodo
- Dogri
- English
- Gujarati
- Hindi
- Kannada
- Kashmiri
- Konkani
- Maithili
- Malayalam
- Marathi
- Meitei (Manipuri)
- Nepali
- Odia
- Punjabi
- Rajasthani
- Sanskrit
- Santali
- Sindhi
- Tamil
- Telugu
- Urdu
Sahitya Akademi Yuva Puraskar
- Assamese
- Bengali
- Bodo
- Dogri
- English
- Gujarati
- Hindi
- Kannada
- Kashmiri
- Konkani
- Maithili
- Malayalam
- Meitei (Manipuri)
- Marathi
- Nepali
- Odia
- Punjabi
- Rajasthani
- Sanskrit
- Santali
- Sindhi
- Tamil
- Telugu
- Urdu
Sahitya Akademi Bal Sahitya Puraskar
- Assamese
- Bengali
- Bodo
- Dogri
- English
- Gujarati
- Hindi
- Kannada
- Kashmiri
- Konkani
- Maithili
- Malayalam
- Meitei (Manipuri)
- Marathi
- Nepali
- Odia
- Punjabi
- Rajasthani
- Sanskrit
- Santali
- Sindhi
- Tamil
- Telugu
- Urdu
Related
- Eighth Schedule to the Constitution of India
- Official Languages Commission
- List of languages by number of native speakers in India

Bal Sahitya Puraskar is given each year to writers for their outstanding works in the 24 languages, since 2010.

== Recipients ==
Following is the list of recipients of Bal Sahitya Puraskar for their works written in Sindhi. The award comprises a cash prize of Rs. 50,000 and an engraved copper plaque.

Year	Author	Work	Genre	References
2010	Khiman U. Mulani	Suhinaa Gulra Baar	Poetry	
2011	Hundraj Balwani	Naon Niralo Jungle	Novel	
2012	Jagdish Lachhani	Roshan Rah	Short Stories	
2013	Vasudev 'Nirmal'	Moonkhe Char Puchh, Rel	Stories	
2014	Vashdev 'Sindhu Bharati'	Total Contribution to Children's Literature		
2015	Jetho Lalwani	Total Contribution to Children's Literature		
2016	Dayal Katumal Dhameja 'Asha'	Total Contribution to Children's Literature		
2017	Roshan Golani	Roshn Barana Bol	Poetry	
2018	Kalpana Ashok Chellani	Suhini Daian	Short Stories	
2019	Veena Shringi	Total Contribution to Children's Literature		
2020	Sahib Bijani	Mundee Kera Paaye?	Drama	
2021	Kishin Khubchandani 'Ranjayal'	Baar Man Thaar	Poetry	
2022	Manohar Nihalani	Anokhiyun Aakhaniyun	Stories	
2023	Dholan Rahi	Vanganmal Ji Shadi	Poetry	
2024	Lal Hotchandani 'Lachaar'	Dostan ji Dosti	Stories	
2025	Heena Agnani 'Heer'	Asmani Pari	Poetry	

== See also ==
- List of Sahitya Akademi Award winners for Sindhi
