= List of Bal Sahitya Puraskar winners for Nepali =

Winners of a literary honour in India

Part of a series on

Sahitya Akademi Awards
Category
Sahitya Akademi Award winners by language
- Assamese
- Bengali
- Bodo
- Dogri
- English
- Gujarati
- Hindi
- Kannada
- Kashmiri
- Konkani
- Maithili
- Malayalam
- Marathi
- Meitei (Manipuri)
- Nepali
- Odia
- Punjabi
- Rajasthani
- Sanskrit
- Santali
- Sindhi
- Tamil
- Telugu
- Urdu
Sahitya Akademi Translation Prizes
- Assamese
- Bengali
- Bodo
- Dogri
- English
- Gujarati
- Hindi
- Kannada
- Kashmiri
- Konkani
- Maithili
- Malayalam
- Marathi
- Meitei (Manipuri)
- Nepali
- Odia
- Punjabi
- Rajasthani
- Sanskrit
- Santali
- Sindhi
- Tamil
- Telugu
- Urdu
Sahitya Akademi Yuva Puraskar
- Assamese
- Bengali
- Bodo
- Dogri
- English
- Gujarati
- Hindi
- Kannada
- Kashmiri
- Konkani
- Maithili
- Malayalam
- Meitei (Manipuri)
- Marathi
- Nepali
- Odia
- Punjabi
- Rajasthani
- Sanskrit
- Santali
- Sindhi
- Tamil
- Telugu
- Urdu
Sahitya Akademi Bal Sahitya Puraskar
- Assamese
- Bengali
- Bodo
- Dogri
- English
- Gujarati
- Hindi
- Kannada
- Kashmiri
- Konkani
- Maithili
- Malayalam
- Meitei (Manipuri)
- Marathi
- Nepali
- Odia
- Punjabi
- Rajasthani
- Sanskrit
- Santali
- Sindhi
- Tamil
- Telugu
- Urdu
Related
- Eighth Schedule to the Constitution of India
- Official Languages Commission
- List of languages by number of native speakers in India

Bal Sahitya Puraskar is given each year to writers for their outstanding works in the 24 languages, since 2010.

== Recipients ==
Following is the list of recipients of Bal Sahitya Puraskar for their works written in Nepali. The award comprises a cash prize of Rs. 50,000 and an engraved copper plaque.

Year	Author	Work	Genre	References
2010	Naina Singh Yonzan	Total Contribution to Children's Literature		
2011	Snehalata Rai	Bal Suman	Poetry	
2012	Shishupal Sharma	Bal Kavita Kosheli	Poetry	
2013	Bhotu Pradhan	Total Contribution to Children's Literature		
2014	Munni Sapkota	Junkiri	Stories	
2015	Mukti Upadhyay	Malati		
2016	Shankardeo Dhakal	Bal Sudha Sagar	Stories	
2017	Shanti Chettri	Total Contribution to Children's Literature		
2018	Bhim Pradhan	Baal Koseli	Short Stories	
2019	Bhabilal Lamichhane	Chara Ko Chirbir Bhura ko Kirkir	Poetry	
2020	Dhruba Chouhan	Akshar Ujyalo		
2021	Sudarshan Ambatey	Jhyaunkiri ra Juunkiri	Poetry	
2022	Meena Subba	Kopilaka Rangharu	Poetry	
2023	Madhusudan Bisht	Bal Ekanki Natakharu	Play	
2024	Basanta Thapa	Desh Ra Fuchhey	Poetry	
2025	Sangmu Lepcha	Shanti Van	Novel	

== See also ==
- List of Sahitya Akademi Award winners for Nepali
