= Asha Mishra =

Indian writer

Asha Mishra is an Indian writer, best known for her Maithili book Uchaat, for which she won a Sahitya Akademi Award in 2014.
