= Haiman Das Rai =

Indian-Nepali writer (1919–2019)

Haiman Das Rai, (1919–2019) better known by his nom de plume Kirat, was an Indian writer, Nepali litterateur, and social worker.

== Literary work ==
Kirat received the Rashtrapari Sikshak Award in 1994. He received the Sahitya Akademi Award for outstanding contribution to Nepali literature in 2008 for his work on Kehi Namileka Rekhaharu. He was awarded the Lifetime Achievement Award by the Gorkha Territorial Administration for outstanding contribution to Nepali literature.

Along with his own writings, Kirat was a publisher in his early life. He published numerous books of eminent Nepali authors in the 1950s and 1960s when Nepali books were published from Varanasi.

The 10 published short-story anthologies penned by Kirat are: Chaukidar (1953), Abhaginiko Sathi (1955), Binayo (1956), Bijay (1965), Batuwa (1957), Aandhibehri (1961), Pankhee (2000), Taha Namileka Rekhaharoo-1 (2006), Taha Namileka Rekhaharoo-2 (2007), Hiking (2010).

== Early life ==
Born 1919, Kirat began writing at the age of 15. He favored writing about the lifestyle of the middle-class, and his first story was published in "Sarada," then Nepal's Journal/Magazine in 1934. Kirat later became a literary publisher, and established the publishing house "Nav Yug Pustak Mandir". He promoted Nepali writers such as Lt. Indra Bahadur Rai, Hari Bhakhta Katuwal, Chandra Sanha Pradhan, and Nar Bahadur Dahal .

== Death ==
Kirat died on 15 July 2019 at age 101 in the Malbazaar sub-divisional hospital in the Dooars. Many senior writers of Nepali literature, political leaders, and social activists expressed their condolences to his family and attended his funeral service.
