= List of Bal Sahitya Puraskar winners for Santali =

Winners of a literary honour in India

Part of a series on

Sahitya Akademi Awards
Category
Sahitya Akademi Award winners by language
- Assamese
- Bengali
- Bodo
- Dogri
- English
- Gujarati
- Hindi
- Kannada
- Kashmiri
- Konkani
- Maithili
- Malayalam
- Marathi
- Meitei (Manipuri)
- Nepali
- Odia
- Punjabi
- Rajasthani
- Sanskrit
- Santali
- Sindhi
- Tamil
- Telugu
- Urdu
Sahitya Akademi Translation Prizes
- Assamese
- Bengali
- Bodo
- Dogri
- English
- Gujarati
- Hindi
- Kannada
- Kashmiri
- Konkani
- Maithili
- Malayalam
- Marathi
- Meitei (Manipuri)
- Nepali
- Odia
- Punjabi
- Rajasthani
- Sanskrit
- Santali
- Sindhi
- Tamil
- Telugu
- Urdu
Sahitya Akademi Yuva Puraskar
- Assamese
- Bengali
- Bodo
- Dogri
- English
- Gujarati
- Hindi
- Kannada
- Kashmiri
- Konkani
- Maithili
- Malayalam
- Meitei (Manipuri)
- Marathi
- Nepali
- Odia
- Punjabi
- Rajasthani
- Sanskrit
- Santali
- Sindhi
- Tamil
- Telugu
- Urdu
Sahitya Akademi Bal Sahitya Puraskar
- Assamese
- Bengali
- Bodo
- Dogri
- English
- Gujarati
- Hindi
- Kannada
- Kashmiri
- Konkani
- Maithili
- Malayalam
- Meitei (Manipuri)
- Marathi
- Nepali
- Odia
- Punjabi
- Rajasthani
- Sanskrit
- Santali
- Sindhi
- Tamil
- Telugu
- Urdu
Related
- Eighth Schedule to the Constitution of India
- Official Languages Commission
- List of languages by number of native speakers in India

Bal Sahitya Puraskar is given each year to writers for their outstanding works in the 24 languages, since 2010.

== Recipients ==
Following is the list of recipients of Bal Sahitya Puraskar for their works written in Santali. The award comprises a cash prize of Rs. 50,000 and an engraved copper plaque.

| Year | Author | Work | Genre | References |
|---|---|---|---|---|
| 2010 | Boyha Biswanath Tudu | Total Contribution to Children's Literature | | |
| 2011 | Nuhum Hembram | Singar Akhra | Poetry | |
| 2012 | Pitambar Hansdah | Jib Jiyali Kowag Gidra Kahni | Short Stories | |
| 2013 | Sari Dharam Hansda | Dombe Baha | Poetry | |
| 2014 | Kanhailal Tudu | Bachra Bayar | Poetry | |
| 2015 | Srikanta Saren | Haryar Mayam | Poetry | |
| 2016 | Kuhu Dular Hansda | Sisir Jali | Poetry | |
| 2017 | Joba Murmu | Olon Baha | Short Stories | |
| 2018 | Laxminarayan Hansda | Budi Goag Garn Thay lag | Short Stories | |
| 2019 | Lakshman Chandra Saren | Jharumjhag | Poetry | |
| 2020 | Joyram Tudu | Bhanj Kul Bhurkah Ipil Sunaram Soren | Biography | |
| 2021 | Sova Hansda | Hali Mon | Poetry | |
| 2022 | Ganesh Marandi | Hapan Mai | Poetry | |
| 2023 | Mansing Majhi | Nene-Pete | Short Stories | |
| 2024 | Dugai Tudu | Miru Arang | Poetry | |
| 2025 | Haralal Murmu | Sona Miru-ag Sandesh | Poetry | |

== See also ==
- List of Sahitya Akademi Award winners for Santali
