= Pt. Raghunath Academy of Santali Cinema and Art =

- Formation: February 3, 2008
- Legal status: Operational
- Purpose: Promoting Santali cinema
- Headquarters: Jamshedpur, Jharkhand, India
- Region served: Jharkhand, Odisha, West Bengal

Pandit Raghunath Murmu Academy of Santali Cinema & Art ('RASCA', Santali :meaning Joy), is a cine academy based in Jamshedpur, Jharkhand, India. It is formed to promote and develop Santali films across the state.

== Activities ==
This academy classes are provided to the students in acting & dancing primarily along with technical education of film equipments along with guest lectures.

Surya Singh Besra, the director of RASCA announced the launch of santali film awards, at a meeting held on February 3, 2008. RASCA's major achievement is that it arranges an award programme for Santali Films each year on 5 May, in which persons related to Santali Films are awarded with certificates, trophies and cash.

The first award ceremony was held on 5 May 2008, at XLRI Auditorium, Jamshedpur.

Award programme was not organised in the year 2009 due to parliamentary elections, & in 2010 due to inadequate number films for nominations, which broke the continuity of organising the award programme each year.

== RASCA Award Ceremony 2008 ==
This was the maiden award ceremony organised by RASCA, & was held on 5 May 2008, at XLRI Auditorium, Jamshedpur.

== RASCA Award Ceremony 2011 ==
2nd RASCA Award was organised in 2011 after a gap of 2 yrs, which became the starting point of continuity, for organising the award programme each year. The award programme was held at Michael John Auditorium, Bistupur.

== RASCA Award Ceremony 2012 ==
The third RASCA Award Ceremony was held on Saturday 05/05/2012, at Birsa Munda Town Hall, Sidhgora.

Category	Winner
Best Santali Movie	Aamge Sari Dulariya
Best Director	Jagannath Murmu (Aamge Sari Dulariya)
Best Actor	Bubun Mardi
Best Actress	Bir Baha Hansda (Aamge Sari Dulariya)
Best Villain	Dharmendra Mardi (Aamge Sari Dulariya)
Best Comic Actor	Sukhlal Murmu (Muluk More Maha)
Best Child Actor	Karna Murmu (Kahins)
Best Supporting Actor	Sunil Hansda (Hala)
Best Supporting Actress	Merila Murmu (Muluk More Maha)
Best Playback Singer (Male)	Subhash Hansda (Aamge Sari Dulariya)
Best Playback Singer (Female)	Anjali (Aamge Sari Dulariya)
Best Lyricist	Chamachand Murmu (Accha Thik Geya)
Best Music	Shyam (Aamge Sari Dulariya)
Best Story	Lakshman Soren (Bonga Kudi)

== RASCA Award Ceremony 2013 ==
The fourth RASCA Award Ceremony was held on Sunday 5 May 2013, at XLRI Auditorium, Jamshedpur.

Category	Winner
Best Santali Movie	Aminj Dular Meya (Production House-Sagen Films)
Best Director	Raju Raaj Biruily (Aminj Dular Meya)
Best Actor	Lakhan Soren (Aminj Dular Meya)
Best Actress	Sonam (Aminj Dular Meya)
Best Villain	Vinod Soren (Sontok)
Best Comic Actor	Srimat Mandi (Aminj Dular Meya)
Best Child Actor	NO Nominations
Best Supporting Actor	Raju Raaj (Aminj Dular Meya)
Best Supporting Actress	Riya (Juwan Mone)
Best Playback Singer (Male)	Dushasan Mahato (Aminj Dular Meya)
Best Playback Singer (Female)	Geeta Baskey ( Juwan Mone)
Best Lyricist	Dushasan Mahato (Aminj Dular Meya)
Best Music	Govinda & Firoz (Lugu Lumang)
Best Story	Krish Sharma & Krishna (Jiwi Gaate)
Best Editing	Pankaj Murmu (Jiwi Gaate)
Best Choreographer	Vishnu Charan Tudu (Juwan Mone)
Best Cinematography	Raja & Tarak (Juwan Mone)
Best Short Film 1	Sari Sohray (Saheb)
Best Short Film 2	Kumbru Kate Aatkar Kedam (Ramswaroop Soren)

Special Jury Award
Dashrath Hansda (Dosar Jonom)
Twinkle Soren (Aminj Dular Meya)
Rupa Hansda (Jiwi Gaate)
Mansingh Majhi (Lugu Lumang)
Munna Hembrom (Jiwi Gaate)

== RASCA Award Ceremony 2014 ==
The 5th RASCA Award Ceremony was held on Monday 05/05/2014, at Sidgora Town hall, Jamshedpur.

Category	Winner
Best Santali Movie	Jaway Oda Bonga Chapad kidinj
Best Director	Raajuraj and Chandramohan Hembram (Jaway Oda Bonga Chapad kidinj)
Best Actor	Ravi Hansda (Jaway Oda Bonga Chapad kidinj)
Best Actress	Reema Sahni(Asha Dolan)
Best Villain	Bajar Hembram( Fagun Koyel)
Best Comic Actor	Sunil Majhi(Jaway Oda Bonga Chapad kidinj)
Best Child Actor	NO Nominations
Best Supporting Actor	Bubun Mardi( Asha Dolan)
Best Supporting Actress	Phulmani Soren(Jaway Oda Bonga Chapad kidinj)
Best Playback Singer (Male)	Tara Gulshan Tudu(Jaway Oda Bonga Chapad kidinj)
Best Playback Singer (Female)	Geeta-Sushma (Jaway Oda Bonga Chapad kidinj)
Best Lyricist	Sanjeev Hembram (Jaway Oda Bonga Chapad kidinj)
Best Music	Subrat (Jaway Oda Bonga Chapad kidinj)
Best Story	Lakhan Tudu (Jaway Oda Bonga Chapad kidinj)
Best Editing	Lakhan Soren (Jaway Oda Bonga Chapad kidinj)
Best Choreographer	Manoj Hembram (Jaway Oda Bonga Chapad kidinj)
Best Cinematography	Rajuraaj (Jaway Oda Bonga Chapad kidinj)
Best Short Film 1	
Best Short Film 2	

== See also ==
- Santali Language
- Santali Latin Alphabet
- Ol Chiki Script
- Ol Chiki Alphabet
- Santali People
- Santali Alphabet
- Santhals
- Santhal
