= Joyram Tudu =

Santali writer

Jairam Tudu
- ᱡᱚᱭᱨᱟᱢ ᱴᱩᱰᱩ
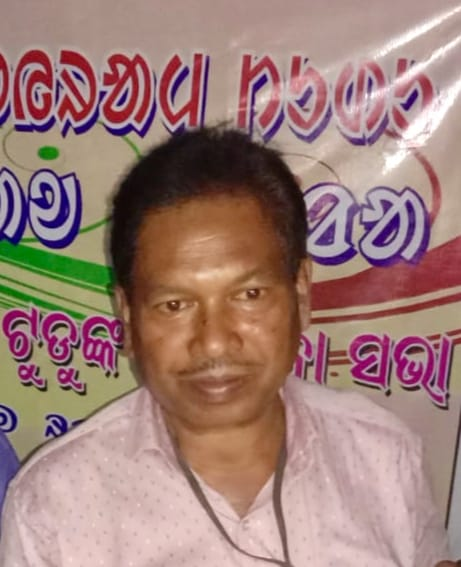
- Joyram Tudu in 2021
- Occupation: Writer
- Writing career
- Language: Santali
- Genres: Biography, Children's literature
- Notable work: Bhanj Kul Bhurkah Ipil Sunaram Soren
- Notable awards: Sahitya Akademi Bal Sahitya Puraskar (2020)

Jairam Tudu, also spelled Jayram Tudu or Joyram Tudu, is an Indian Santali writer. He received the Sahitya Akademi Bal Sahitya Puraskar in 2020 for his Santali biography Bhanj Kul Bhurkah Ipil Sunaram Soren.

== Early life ==
Jairam Tudu was born on 12 October 1964 in Mundhabani village of Mayurbhanj district, in the Indian state of Odisha.

== Awards ==
- Bal Sahitya Puraskar in 2020 for Bhanj Kul Bhurkah Ipil Sunaram Soren.
- Odisha Janjati Gaurab Puraskar in 2023.

== See also ==
- Santali literature
- Ol Chiki
- Sahitya Akademi
- List of Bal Sahitya Puraskar winners for Santali
