= Ganesh Marandi =

Indian Santali poet and teacher

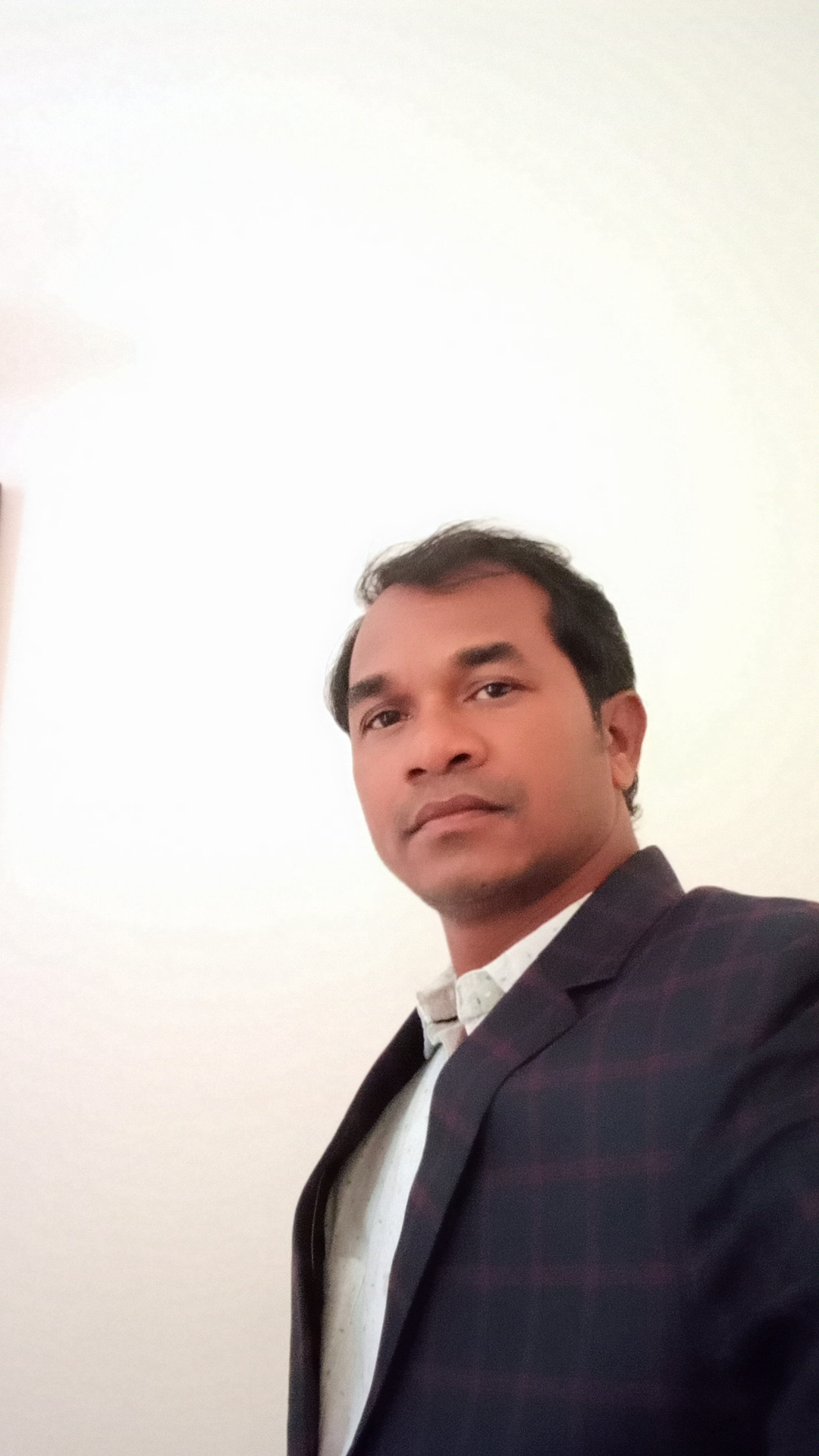
- Ganesh Marandi in 2022
- Born: West Bengal, India
- Occupations: Teacher, poet
- Writing career
- Language: Santali
- Genre: Children's poetry
- Notable work: Hapan Mai
- Notable awards: Bal Sahitya Puraskar (2022)

Ganesh Marandi is an Indian poet. He received the Bal Sahitya Puraskar in 2022 from the Sahitya Akademi for his poetry collection Hapan Mai.

== See also ==
- Santali literature
- Ol Chiki script
- Bal Sahitya Puraskar
