= Dugai Tudu =

Santali Writer

- Born: India
- Occupations: Writer, poet
- Writing career
- Language: Santali
- Genres: Children's literature, poetry
- Notable work: Miru Arang
- Notable awards: Sahitya Akademi Bal Sahitya Puraskar (2024)

Dugai Tudu is an Indian Santali writer.He received the Sahitya Akademi Bal Sahitya Puraskar in 2024 for his poetry collection Miru Arang.

== See also ==
- Santali literature
- Ol Chiki
- Sahitya Akademi
- Bal Sahitya Puraskar
