= Nayana Adarkar =

Indian writer (born 1959)

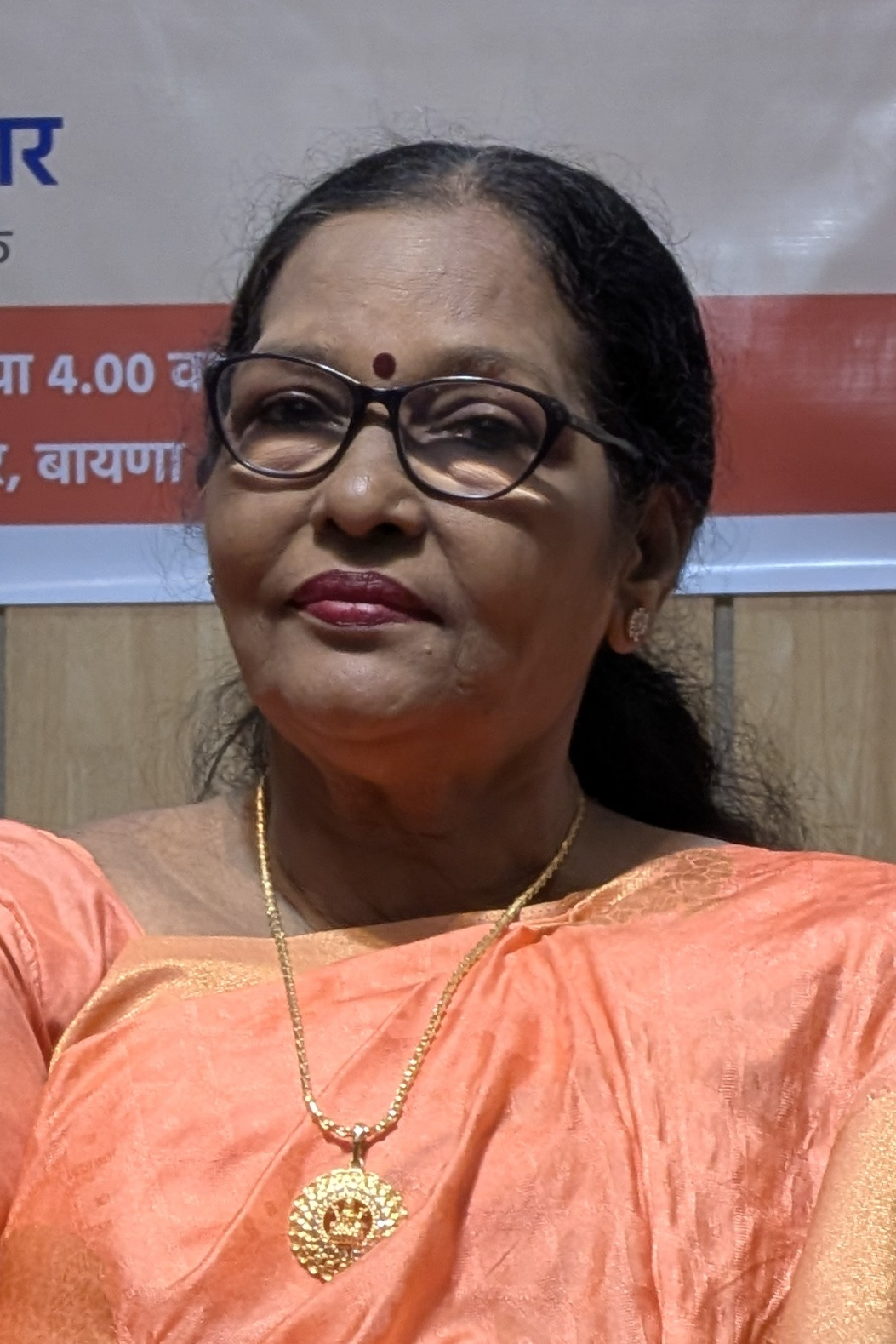
- Adarkar in 2026
- Born: 28 July 1959 (age 67)
- Writing career
- Language: Konkani language
- Notable work: Belabaicho Shankar Aani Haer Kanyo
- Notable awards: Yashadamini Puraskar; Bal Sahitya Puraskar 2025 in Konkani

Nayana Adarkar (born 28 July 1959) is an Indian writer. She won the Bal Sahitya Puraskar 2025 in Konkani language for her collection of stories, Belabaicho Shankar Aani Haer Kanyo.

== Career ==
Adarkar has written poetry collections like Kisran, Mansanvar and Pratima. She has written story collections Krishnachud and Spandan. Her literary essays Chanfo, Batmogrim, Kantekunvar and Povanam were relatable to both, critics and readers.

Her work has been included in the textbooks of Goa Board of Secondary and Higher Secondary Education, and as part of the Bachelor of Arts course at Goa University.

== Awards and accolades ==
Adarkar has been awarded the Yashadamini Puraskar by the Government of Goa and the Saraswatibai Sahitya Puraskar by the Kerala Prachar Sabha. She was also awarded the Sahitya awards of both, Konkani Bhasha Mandal and the Goa Konkani Akademi. She has also won the Dr T M Pai Foundation Prashasti Puraskar. In 2025, she won the Bal Sahitya Puraskar in Konkani language for her collection of stories, Belabaicho Shankar Aani Haer Kanyo.
