= Dipanwita Roy =

Indian writer

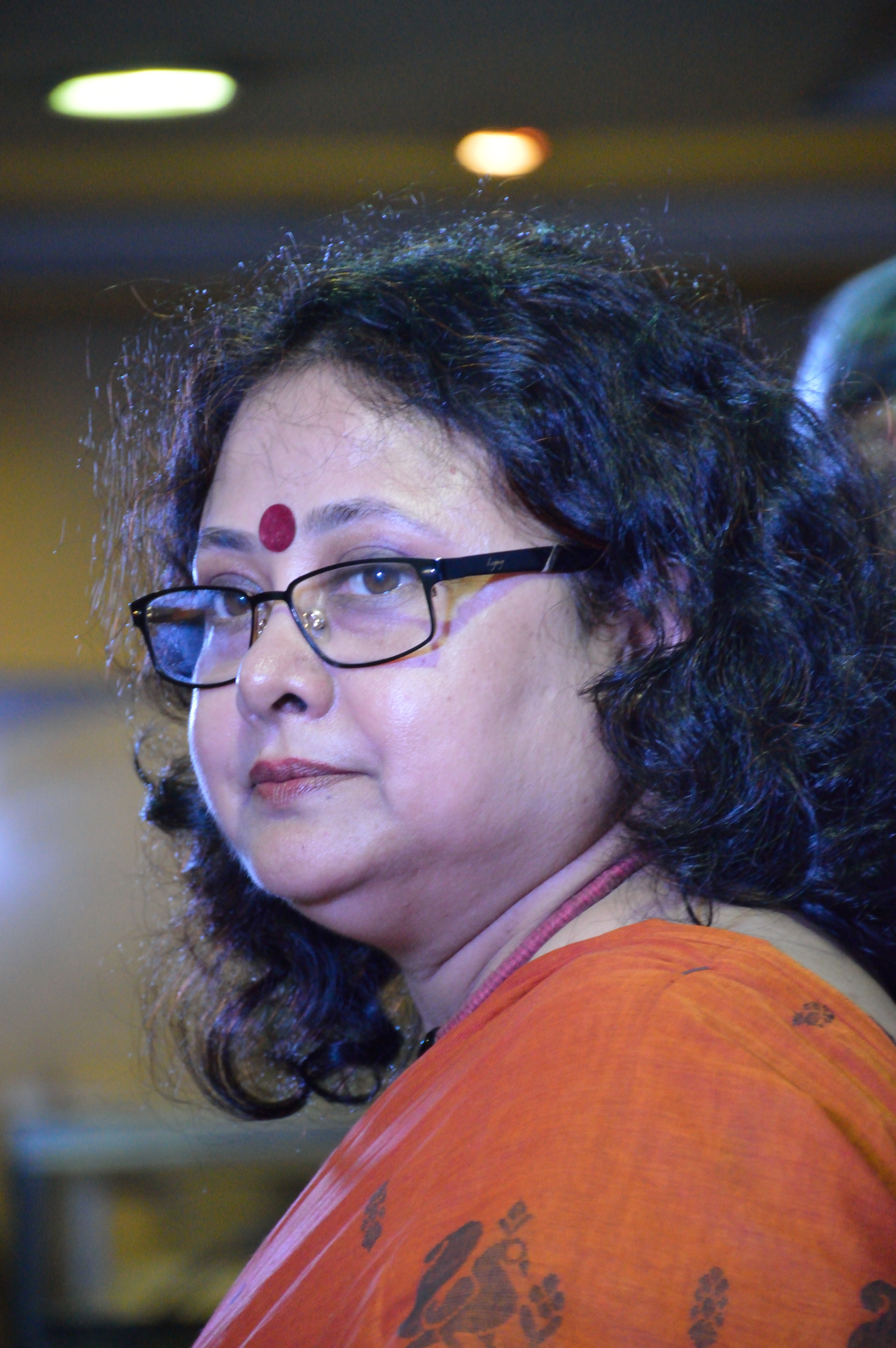
- Citizenship: India
- Occupations: Writer and Journalist
- Writing career
- Language: Bengali
- Notable work: Mahidadur Antidote
- Notable awards: Bal Sahitya Puraskar; 2024

Dipanwita Roy is a Bengali writer and journalist.

She completed her studies in Comparative Literature at Jadavpur University. She has always been especially interested in children's literature.

In 2024, Dipanwita Roy was honored with the Bal Sahitya Puraskar by the Sahitya Akademi for her novel Mahidadur Antidote.

== Works ==
Dipanwita Roy is primarily a children's writer. Her published literary works are Gobeshonagare Guptochor, Joler Tolaye Atanka and Mahidadur Antidote.
