= Kuhu Dular Hansda =

Santali writer and Yuva Puraskar recipient

Kuhu Dular Hansdah is a Santali language Indian writer. in He received Bal Sahitya Puraskar for 2016 for his poetry work Sisir Jali.
