= Lakshman Chandra Saren =

Santali writer

Lakshman Chandra Saren is an Indian Santali language writer. He received the Sahitya Akademi Bal Sahitya Puraskar in 2019 for his poetry book Jharumjhag.

== Awards ==
- Sahitya Akademi Bal Sahitya Puraskar (2019) – for Jharumjhag.
