= Bal Sahitya Puraskar 2023 =

Children's literature awards in 2023

- Awarded for: Literary awards for children's literature in Indian languages
- Sponsored by: Sahitya Akademi, Government of India
- Reward: ₹ 50,000
- Website: Official website

The Bal Sahitya Puraskar 2023 (transl. Children's literature award), also known as Sahitya Akademi Bal Sahitya Puraskar 2023, is a 2023 literary honour in India, which the Sahitya Akademi, India's National Academy of Letters, annually confers on writers for their contribution in the field of Children's literature in any of the 22 languages of the 8th Schedule to the Indian constitution as well as in English and Rajasthani language. It comprises a cash prize of Rs. 50,000 and an engraved copper plaque.

== Recipients by language ==
| Languages | Authors | Works | Genres | References |
|---|---|---|---|---|
| Assamese | Rothindranath Goswami | Powalmoni Aru Chichingar Duhxahaxik Abhijan | Novel | |
| Bengali | Shyamal Kanti Das | Eroplaner Khata | Novel | |
| Boro | Pratima Nandi Narzaree | Gosaini Gwjwn Nwjwr | Short Stories | |
| Dogri | Balwan Singh Jamoria | Kanjkan | Poetry | |
| English | Sudha Murty | Grandparent's Bag of Stories | Stories | |
| Gujarati | Rakshabahen Prahladrao Dave | Hun Myaun, Tun Choon Choon | Poetry and Stories | |
| Hindi | Suryanath Singh | Kotuk App | Short Stories | |
| Kannada | Vijayashree Haladi | Surakki Gate | Novel | |
| Kashmiri | NO AWARD | | | |
| Konkani | Tukaram Rama Shet | Jaan | Novel | |
| Maithili | Akshay Anand 'Sunny' | Ol Katra, Jhol Katra | Poetry | |
| Malayalam | Priya A. S. | Perumazhayathe Kunjithalukal | Novel | |
| Meitei (Manipuri) | Dilip Nongmaithem | Ibemma Amasung Ngabemma | Children's stories | |
| Marathi | Eknath Avhad | Chhand Dei Aanand | Poetry | |
| Nepali | Madhusudan Bisht | Bal Ekanki Natakharu | Play | |
| Odia | Jugal Kishore Sarangi | Jejenka Gapa Ganthili | Short Stories | |
| Punjabi | Gurmeet Karyalvi | Sachi Di Kahani | Short Stories | |
| Rajasthani | Kiran Badal | Tabran Ri Duniya | Memoir | |
| Sanskrit | Radha Vallabh Tripathi | Manavi | Novel | |
| Santhali | Mansingh Majhi | Nene-Pete | Short Stories | |
| Sindhi | Dholan Rahi | Vanganmal Ji Shadi | Poetry | |
| Tamil | Udayasankar | Aadhanin Bommai | Novel | |
| Telugu | D. K. Chaduvula Babu | Vajrala Vanana | Short Stories | |
| Urdu | Mateen Achlpuri | Mamta ki Dor | Short Stories | |

== See also ==
- Sahitya Akademi Award
- Yuva Puraskar
