= Mansingh Manjhi =

Santali language writer

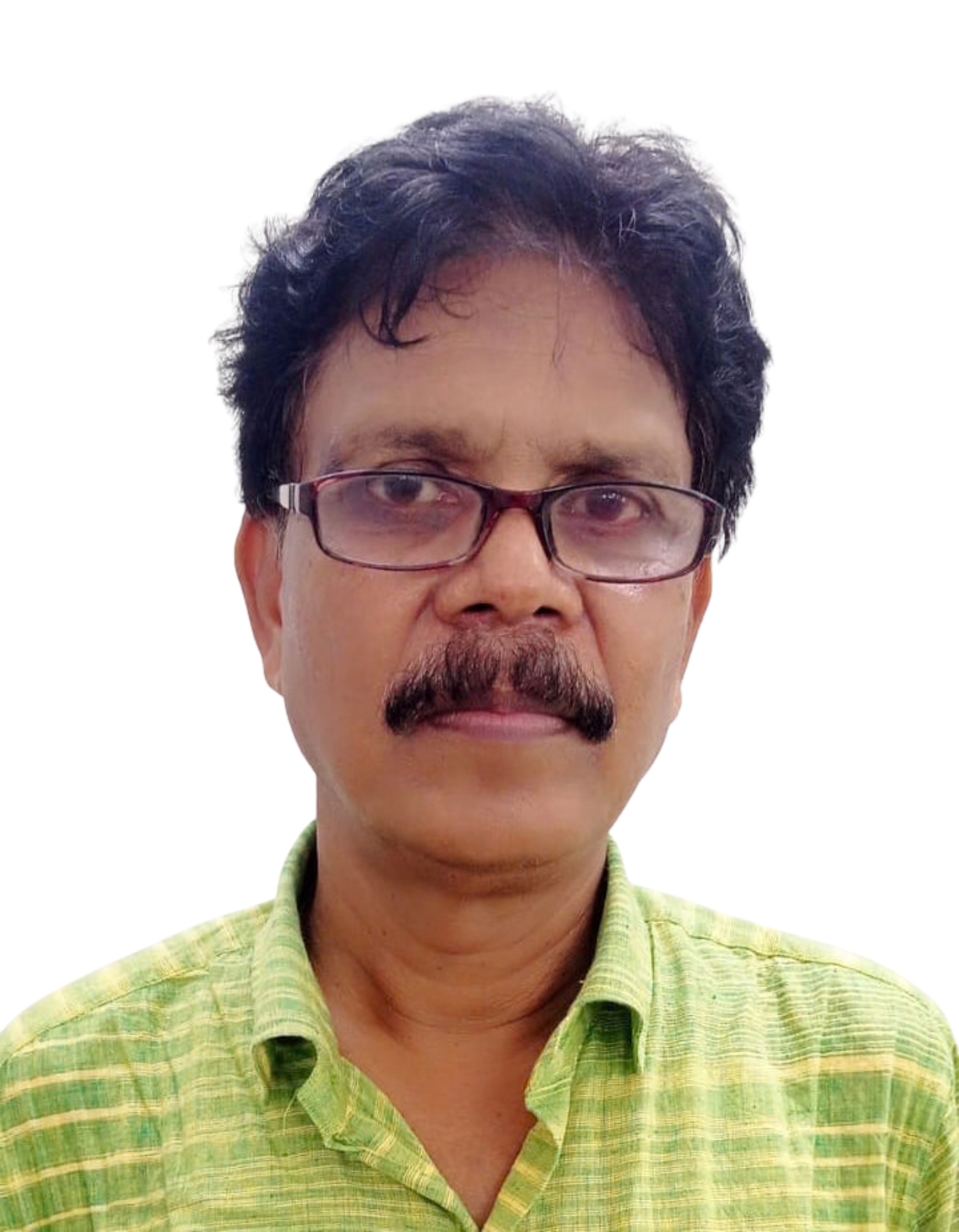
- Born: 1963 (age 62–63); Patakocha, Seraikela Kharsawan, Jharkhand, India
- Occupations: Writer, lyricist, film producer
- Writing career
- Pen name: Olkhoba
- Language: Santali
- Notable work: Nene-Pete (2018)
- Notable awards: Sahitya Akademi Bal Sahitya Puraskar (2023)

Mansingh Manjhi (born 1963), also known by the pen name Olkhoba, is an Indian writer, lyricist, and film producer who writes in the Santali language. He is best known for his contributions to children's literature, for which he was awarded the Sahitya Akademi Bal Sahitya Puraskar in 2023. Manjhi has been a prominent figure in the promotion of Santali folk art, cinema, and literature for over two decades.

== Early life and education ==
Mansingh Manjhi was born in 1963 in Patakocha village, Rajnagar, in the Seraikela Kharsawan district of Jharkhand (then part of Bihar). He spent much of his childhood in Ranidih Koketola, near Jamshedpur. He completed his matriculation from Karandih High School. Following his schooling, he was selected for a trade apprenticeship at Tata Steel, which marked the end of his formal academic education as he entered the workforce.

== Literary career ==
Manjhi writes primarily in the Santali language using the Ol Chiki script. Although he began writing poems and stories early in life, he did not publish his first book until 2014.

His most notable work is Nene-Pete (2018), a collection of 13 short stories written for children. The title "Nene-Pete" translates roughly to "in a playful manner." The stories focus on the daily lives of tribal children, village lifestyles, and the preservation of Adivasi folk traditions.

=== Published works ===
- Rahla Rimil Danaang Khon (2014) – An anthology of poems.
- Sakam Odage – A collection of stories.
- Are Kahani – A collection of stories.
- Nene-Pete (2018) – Short stories for children.

== Contributions to cinema ==
Apart from literature, Manjhi is a prolific lyricist and producer in the Santali cinema industry. He has written over 100 songs for tribal films and has produced several Santhali movies, including:

- Lugu Lamang
- Mogod Dulad
- Haat Boyla
- Mulung Modhe Maha
- Miracle of Lugu Buru (Documentary)

== Awards and recognition ==
- Sahitya Akademi Bal Sahitya Puraskar (2023) Awarded for his book Nene-Pete.

== Personal life ==
Manjhi is a resident of Jahertola in the Baridih area of Jamshedpur. He is an employee of Tata Steel’s equipment maintenance department. He is married to Rani Mardi, a well-known playback singer and director in Santali cinema.
