= Santali Latin alphabet =

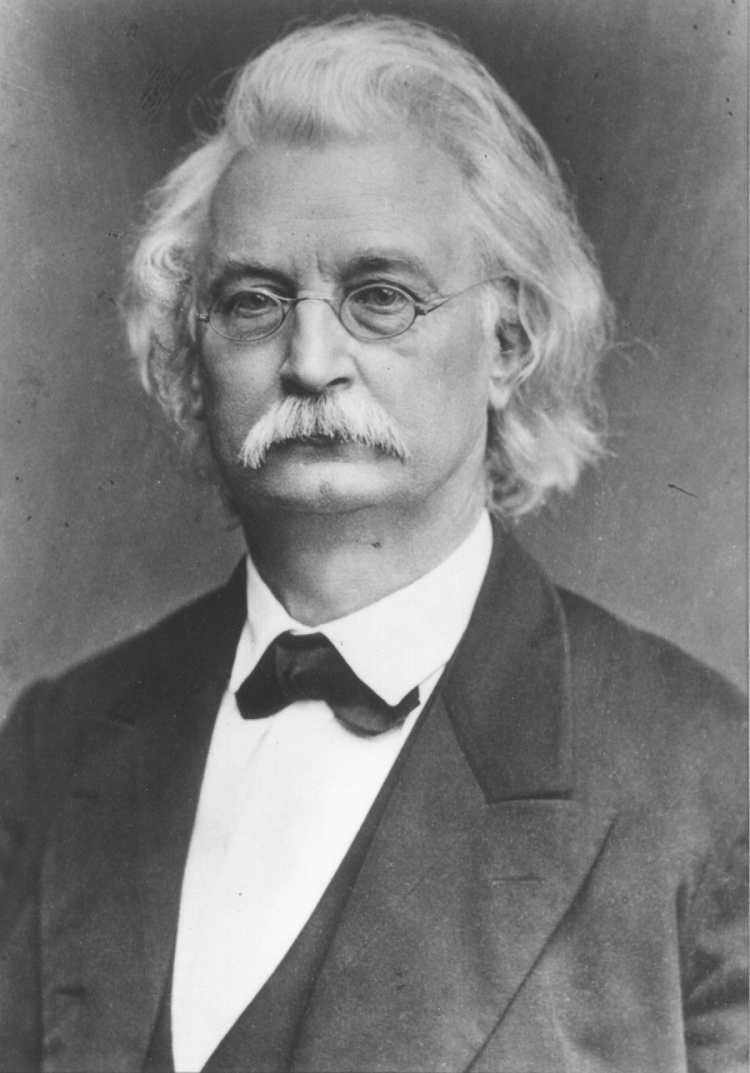
Carl Richard Lepsius

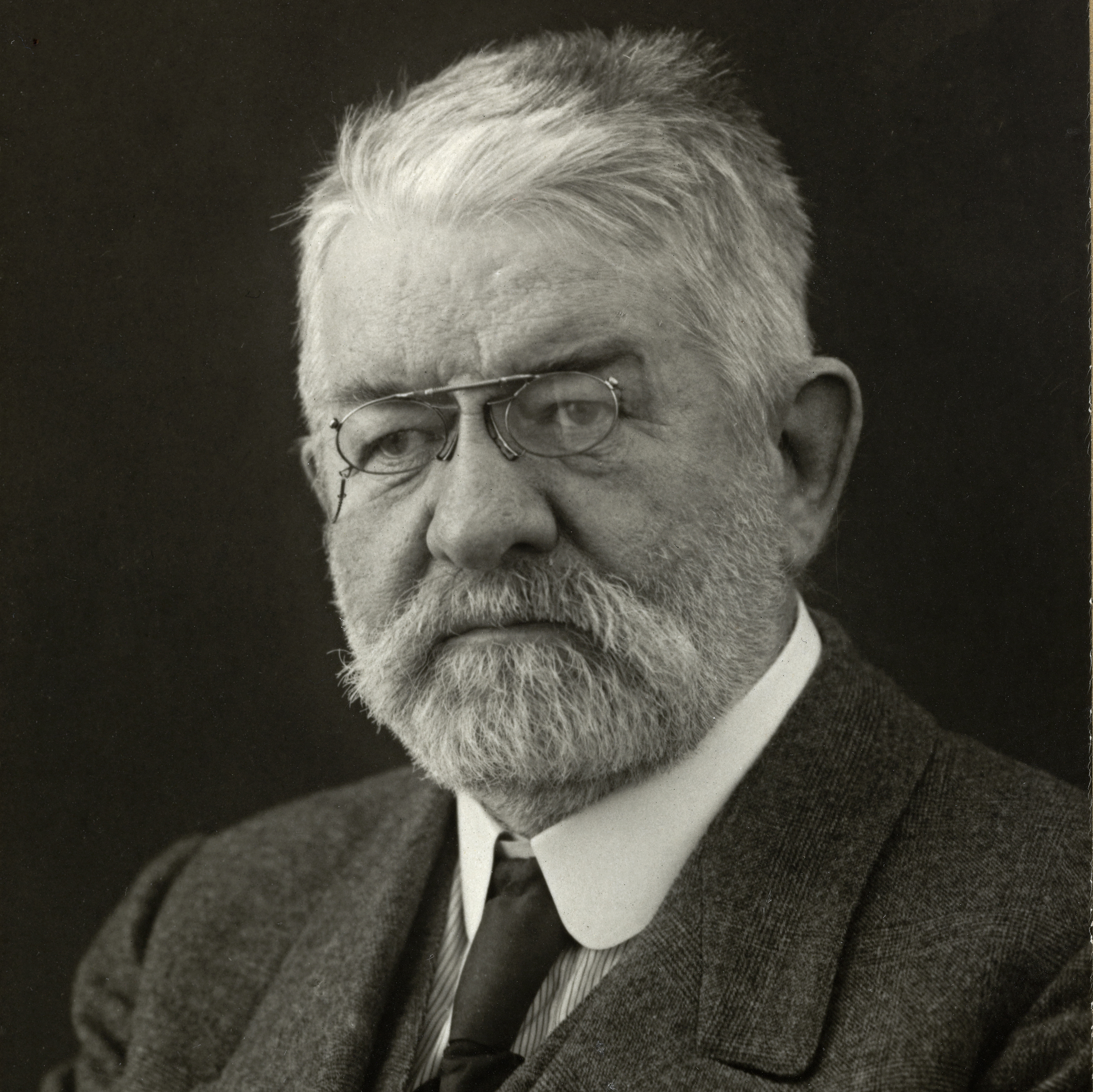
Paul Olaf Bodding

The Santali Latin alphabet was invented in the 1890s by the Norwegian missionary Paul Olaf Bodding, and is still used by some Santals, especially the members of the Northern Evangelical Lutheran Church (NELC). Since the Santals had no alphabet till 1925 when Pandit Raghunath Murmu invented Ol chiki script in 1925, they adopted the Latin script, using certain diacritical marks to denote sounds that differ from those these letters have in English. This was done under the influence of Christian missionaries who were the first to take an active interest in the study of the Santali language.

The first version of Santali romanization was developed by Carl Richard Lepsius in 1863, who introduced diacritical marks for certain phonemes. Subsequent Norwegian missionaries continued the work until Bodding's in the 1890s.

== Letters ==
A a	Ã ã	Ạ ạ	Ạ̃ ạ̃	B b	BH bh	C c	CH ch	C' c'	D d
/a/	/ã/	/ə/	/ə̃/	/b/	/bʱ/	/t͡ʃ/	/t͡ʃʰ/	/ˀt͡ʃ/ (Note: Phonetic realization [ˀɟ̚ᶮ] (Osada 1992).)	/d̪/
DH dh	Ḍ ḍ	ḌH ḍh	E e	Ẽ ẽ	E̠ e̠	Ẽ̠ ẽ̠	Ẹ ẹ	G g	GH gh
/d̪ʱ/	/ɖ/	/ɖʱ/	/e/	/ẽ/	/ɛ/	/ɛ̃/	/e̥/ (Note: Not attested by Ghosh.)	/g/	/gʱ/
H h	I i	Ĩ i	J j	JH jh	K k	KH kh	K' k'	L l	M m
/h/	/i/	/ĩ/	/d͡ʒ/	/d͡ʒʱ/	/k/	/kʰ/	/ˀk/ (Note: Phonetic rendering [ʔ])	/l/	/m/
N n	Ṅ ṅ	Ń ń	Ṇ ṇ	O o	Õ Õ	O̠ o̠	Õ̠ õ̠	Ọ ọ	P p
/n/	/ŋ/	/ɲ/	/ɳ/	/o/	/õ/	/ɔ/	/ɔ̃/	/o̥/ (Note: Not encountered by Ghosh.)	/p/
PH ph	P' p'	R r	Ṛ ṛ	S s	T t	TH th	Ṭ ṭ	ṬH ṭh	T' t'
/pʰ/	/ˀp/ (Note: Phonetic rendering [ˀb̥̚ᵐ])	/r/	/ɽ/	/s/ or /ʃ/	/t̪/	/t̪ʰ/	/ʈ/	/ʈʰ/	/ˀt/ (Note: Phonetic rendering [ˀd̥̚ⁿ])
U u	V v	W w	Y y
/u/	/v/ (Note: Not encountered by Ghosh.)	/w, ʷ/	/j ~ ʑ/

== Other script ==
The Santali language is now primarily written using the Ol Chiki script and it is being used in several schools, colleges, universities and government purposes in eastern states of India in Santal dominated regions.
