= Kanhailal Tudu =

- ᱠᱟᱹᱱᱟᱹᱭᱞᱟᱞ ᱴᱩᱰᱩ
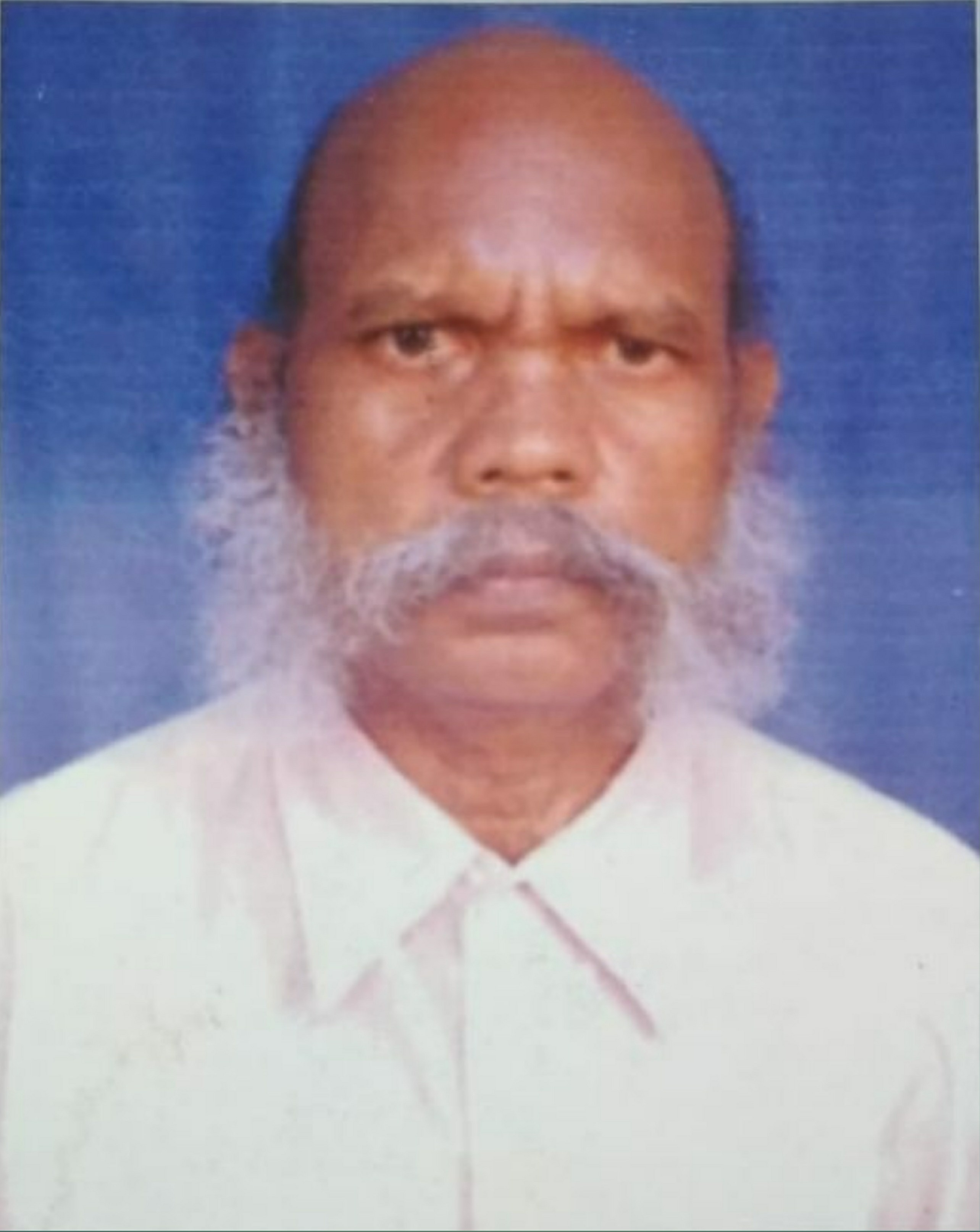
- Occupation: Writer
- Writing career
- Language: Santali
- Notable awards: Bal Sahitya Puraskar

Kanhailal Tudu is an Indian Santali language writer. He was awarded the Bal Sahitya Puraskar by the Sahitya Akademi in 2014 for his Santali poetry collection Bachra Bayar.
