= Ol Chiki (Unicode block) =

- Range: U+1C50..U+1C7F (48 code points)
- Plane: BMP
- Scripts: Ol Chiki
- Major alphabets: Santali
- Assigned: 48 code points
- Unused: 0 reserved code points

Unicode version history
- 5.1 (2008): 48 (+48)

Unicode documentation
- Code chart ∣ Web page

Ol Chiki is a Unicode block containing characters of the Ol Chiki, or Ol Cemet' script used for writing the Santali language during the early 20th century.

Ol Chiki^{[1]} Official Unicode Consortium code chart (PDF)
	0	1	2	3	4	5	6	7	8	9	A	B	C	D	E	F
U+1C5x	᱐	᱑	᱒	᱓	᱔	᱕	᱖	᱗	᱘	᱙	ᱚ	ᱛ	ᱜ	ᱝ	ᱞ	ᱟ
U+1C6x	ᱠ	ᱡ	ᱢ	ᱣ	ᱤ	ᱥ	ᱦ	ᱧ	ᱨ	ᱩ	ᱪ	ᱫ	ᱬ	ᱭ	ᱮ	ᱯ
U+1C7x	ᱰ	ᱱ	ᱲ	ᱳ	ᱴ	ᱵ	ᱶ	ᱷ	ᱸ	ᱹ	ᱺ	ᱻ	ᱼ	ᱽ	᱾	᱿
Notes 1.As of Unicode version 17.0

== History ==
The following Unicode-related documents record the purpose and process of defining specific characters in the Ol Chiki block:

Version	Final code points (Note: Proposed code points and characters names may differ from final code points and names)	Count	L2 ID	WG2 ID	Document
5.1	U+1C50..1C7F	48	L2/99-060	N1956	Everson, Michael (1999-01-29), Proposal for encoding the Ol Cemet' script in the BMP of the UCS
5.1	U+1C50..1C7F	48	L2/02-422	N2505	Everson, Michael; Hansdah, R. C.; Murmu, N. C. (2002-11-03), Revised proposal for encoding the Ol Chiki script in the UCS
5.1	U+1C50..1C7F	48	L2/02-443	N2561	Raska, Divyendu; Marandi, Archer (2002-11-30), The need and practicalities to encode the 'Roman Script Santali' In the universal character set – a protest against efforts to encode the 'Ol Chiki' in the universal character set.
5.1	U+1C50..1C7F	48	L2/02-453	N2562	Anderson, Deborah (2002-12-03), Response to Divyendu Raska
5.1	U+1C50..1C7F	48	L2/02-456		Anderson, Deborah (2002-12-09), Comments on Ol Chiki/Summary of Report from West Bengal
5.1	U+1C50..1C7F	48	L2/03-008		Raska, Divyendu Tudu (2002-12-16), Letter to Deborah Anderson re Santali
5.1	U+1C50..1C7F	48	L2/03-007		Saren, Jyotsna (2002-12-19), General protest against hindering of OL CHIKI
5.1	U+1C50..1C7F	48	L2/03-005		Anderson, Deborah (2002-12-30), Letter to D. Mardi
5.1	U+1C50..1C7F	48	L2/03-006		Anderson, Deborah (2002-12-30), Letter to Hanuk Hansdak and Ezicheal Hembrom
5.1	U+1C50..1C7F	48	L2/03-062		Anderson, Deborah (2003-02-23), Ol Chiki Correspondence Summary
5.1	U+1C50..1C7F	48	L2/05-243R	N2984R	Everson, Michael (2005-09-05), Final proposal to encode the Ol Chiki script in the UCS
5.1	U+1C50..1C7F	48	L2/05-270		Whistler, Ken (2005-09-21), "J. Old Chiki", WG2 Consent Docket (Sophia Antipolis)
5.1	U+1C50..1C7F	48	L2/05-279		Moore, Lisa (2005-11-10), "Consensus 105-C31", UTC #105 Minutes
5.1	U+1C50..1C7F	48		N2953 (pdf, doc)	Umamaheswaran, V. S. (2006-02-16), "7.4.14", Unconfirmed minutes of WG 2 meeting 47, Sophia Antipolis, France; 2005-09-12/15
5.1	U+1C50..1C7F	48		N3075	Anderson, Deborah (2006-04-10), Support for Ol Chiki (N2984R =L2/05-243R)
5.1	U+1C50..1C7F	48	L2/06-131		Anderson, Deborah (2006-04-12), Support for Ol Chiki
