= Norman Zide =

American linguist (1928–2023)

- Born: Norman Herbert Zide; May 30, 1928
- Died: February 21, 2023 (aged 94)
- Other name: Norman H. Zide
- Occupation: Linguist

Academic work
- Discipline: Linguistics
- Institutions: University of Chicago
- Main interests: Munda languages

Norman Herbert Zide (May 30, 1928 – February 21, 2023) was an American linguist and specialist in the Munda languages. He was Professor Emeritus at the University of Chicago. He taught Hindi and Urdu at the Department of South Asian Languages & Civilization at the Department of Linguistics of the University of Chicago for four decades and published several books and articles on the subject. However, his greater fame lies in his contributions to the Munda languages and to Austroasiatic linguistics in general. He has also done considerable work as a translator, especially of poetry. In The Oxford Anthology of Modern Indian Poetry, he did or assisted in translations of poetry from both North Indian and Austroasiatic languages. His undergraduate education was at Columbia University where he majored in French. In the 1950s he began to do graduate work in South Asian languages and linguistics.

In India, he carried out linguistic fieldwork in many places, but especially in Orissa and Bihar.

Zide died on February 21, 2023, at the age of 94.

== Bibliography ==
- Anderson, Gregory D.S. and Norman H. Zide. "Recent advances in the reconstruction of the Proto-Munda verb". In Historical Linguistics 1999, Brinton, Laurel J. (ed.). Amsterdam: Benjamins, 2001. 13-3013–30.
- Anderson, Gregory D.S. & Norman H. Zide. 2002. "Issues in Proto-Munda and Proto-Austroasiatic Nominal Derivation: The Bimoraic Constraint" In pers from the 10th Annual Meeting of the Southeast Asian Linguistics Society. Marlys A. Macken (ed.). Tempe, AZ: Arizona State University. (South East Asian Studies Program, Monograph Series Press). 55-74
- George Cardona and Norman H. Zide (eds). Festschrift for Henry Hoenigswald: on the occasion of his seventieth birthday Tübingen: G. Narr, 1987.
- Diffloth, G. & N. Zide. 1992. "Austro-Asiatic languages." In: William Bright (ed.): International Encyclopedia of Linguistics. New York: Oxford University Press. Vol. I:137-42
- Pinnow, Heinz-Jürgen. "A Comparative Study of the Verb in the Munda Languages." In Studies in Comparative Austroasiatic Linguistics, Norman H. Zide (ed.). The Hague et al.: Mouton (Indo-Iranian Monographs, V), 1966. 96-193
- Stampe, D.L. & Norman Herbert Zide. "The Place of Kharia–Juang in the Munda family" IL, Emeneau Sastipurti Volume. 1968. 370-77
- Zide, Norman H. (ed.). Studies in Comparative Austroasiatic Linguistics. The Hague: Mouton, 1966.
- Zide, Norman Herbert. 1958. "Some Korku kinship terms in Proto-Munda" Bulletin of the Tribal Research Institute Chhindwara (MP), I.4/II.1:9-21
- Zide, Norman Herbert. 1965. Gutob–Remo vocalism and glottalized vowels in Proto-Munda” Milner et al. (eds.). Indo-Pacific Linguistic Studies (Lingua 14), 43-53
- Zide, Norman Herbert & Michael Shapiro. "Short combining forms of Munda nouns." Mimeographed paper
- Zide, Norman Herbert. 1969. "Munda and non-Munda Austroasiatic languages" Th. Sebeok (ed.). Current Trends in Linguistics. Vol. V. 411-30
- Zide, Norman H. 1969. Review of: Bibliography of publications in tribal languages. (Census of India, 1961) Compiled by S.P. Bhatnagar and N.K. Banerjee, supervised by N.K. Banerjee and edited by B.K. Roy Burman. New Delhi: Office of the Registrar General, n.d.. Language, 45/3:673-8
- Zide, Norman Herbert. 1972. "Some Munda Etymological Notes on Names in the RâmâyaNa" Journal of the Ganganatha Jha Kendriya Sanskrit Vidyapeetha 28 [= Kshetresa Chandra Chattopadhyaya Felicitation Volume, Pt. 2]. 747-63
- Zide, Arlene R.K. & Norman H. Zide. 1972. "Semantic reconstructions in proto-Munda cultural vocabulary I." Indian Linguistics, December, 1972
- Zide, Norman Herbert. 1976. "'3' and '4' in South Munda" Linguistics, 174:89-98
- Zide, Norman Herbert. 1976. Introduction to the special issue on "Austroasiatic number system". G. Diffloth & N.H. Zide, eds. Linguistics, an international review. The Hague: Mouton. 174
- Zide, Norman Herbert & A. Zide. 1976. "Proto-Munda cultural vocabulary: Evidence for early agriculture" Philip N. Jenner, Laurence C. Thompson, and Stanley Starosta (eds.). Austroasiatic Studies, Volume II. Honolulu: University of Hawaii (Oceanic Linguistics, Special Publication, No. 13). Part II: 1295-334
- Zide, Norman Herbert. 1978. Studies in the Munda Numerals. Mysore: Central Institute of Indian Languages
- Zide, Norman Herbert. 1981. "Robert Needham Cust and the Beginnings of Comparative Kolarian (Munda) Studies" B.P. Mallik (ed.). Suniti Kumar Chatterji Commemoration Volume. 298-320 [Repr.: 1989, Kh. Mahapatra (ed.). Banaja: Souvenir Published on the occasion of ADIBASI EXHIBITION 1989, 1-17]
- Zide, Norman Herbert. 1985. "Notes mostly historical on some participant roles in some Munda languages" A.R.K. Zide, D. Magier, E. Schiller (eds.). Proceedings of the Conference on Participant Roles: South-Asia and Adjacent Areas. 92-103
- Zide, Norman Herbert. 1991. "Lexicography of Other Languages of the Indian Subcontinent: The Munda Languages" J. Hausman, O. Reichmann, H.E. Wiegand, L. Zgusta (eds.). Wörterbücher: Ein internationales Handbuch zur Lexikographie/Dictionaries: An International Encyclopedia of Lexicography/Dictionnaires: Encyclopédie internationale de lexicographe, pt. 3, 2533-47
- Zide, Norman Herbert. & A.R.K. Zide. 1991."A linguistic analysis of some South Munda kinship terms, I" H.C.S. Davidson (ed.). Austroasiatic Languages: Essays in honour of H.L. Shorto. 43-59
- Zide, Norman Herbert. 1999. "Three Munda Scripts" Linguistics of the Tibeto-Burman Area, 22:199-232
- Zide, Norman Herbert. 1999. "Noun Formatives in South Munda: Implications for South Munda Subgrouping." Presented at SALA 1999. Urbana, IL.
- Zide, Norman. "Santali". In Jane Garry and Carl Rubino (eds.). Facts About the World's Languages: An Encyclopedia of the World's Major Languages: Past and Present. New York/Dublin: H. W. Wilson Press, 2001.
- Zide, Norman Herbert and G.D.S. Anderson. 1999. "The Proto-Munda Verb and Some Connections with Mon–Khmer." P. Bhaskararao (ed.). Working Papers International Symposium on South Asian Languages: Contact, Convergence, and Typology. Tokyo. 401-21
- Zide, Norman Herbert & G.D.S. Anderson. to appear. "Towards an Analysis of the South Munda Verb." F.K. Lehman (ed.). SEALS-VII. Proceedings of the South-East Asian Linguistic Society
- Zide, Norman Herbert & G.D.S. Anderson. to appear. "The Proto-Munda Verb: Some Connections with Mon–Khmer." K.V. Subbarao and P. Bhaskararao (eds.). Yearbook of South Asian Languages and Linguistics, 2001. Delhi: Sage Publications
- Zide, Norman Herbert & Gérard Diffloth. 1992. "Austro-Asiatic Languages" William Bright (ed.). International Encyclopedia of Linguistics, Vol. 1. 137-42
- Zide, Norman H., Colin P. Masica, K. C. Bahl, A. C. Chandola. A Premchand Reader. Honolulu: Published for the South Asia Language and Area Center, University of Chicago, by East-West Center Press, 1965.

== Translations ==
In The Oxford Anthology of Modern Indian Poetry, Vinay Dharwadker and AK Ramanujan (eds).
