= Bal Sahitya Puraskar 2021 =

Children's literature awards in 2021

- Awarded for: Literary awards for children's literature in Indian languages
- Sponsored by: Sahitya Akademi, Government of India
- Reward: ₹ 50,000
- Website: Official website

The Bal Sahitya Puraskar 2021 (transl. Children's literature award), also known as Sahitya Akademi Bal Sahitya Puraskar 2021, is a 2021 literary honour in India, which the Sahitya Akademi, India's National Academy of Letters, annually confers on writers for their contribution in the field of Children's literature in any of the 22 languages of the 8th Schedule to the Indian constitution as well as in English and Rajasthani language. It comprises a cash prize of Rs. 50,000 and an engraved copper plaque.

== Recipients ==
Authors	Works	Genres	Languages
Mrinal Chandra Kalita	Bakul Phular Dare	Novel	Assamese
Sunirmal Chakraborty	Batakesto Babur Chhata	Short Stories	Bengali
Ratneswar Narzary	Dikhura Solobatha	Folk Tales	Bodo
Narsingh Dev Jamwal	Khadak Singh Te Usda Guglu	Short Novel	Dogri
Anita Vachharajani	Amrita Sher-gil: Rebel with a paintbrush	Biography	English
No award			Gujarati
Devendra Mewari	Natak Natak me Vigyan	Play	Hindi
Basu Bevinagida	Odi Hoda Huduga	Novel	Kannada
Majeed Majazi	Phulai Gulan Henz	Short Stories	Kashmiri
Sumedha Kamat Desai	Sumiche Cottangree	Short Novel	Konkani
Anmol Jha	Lagi Jo Phool Akash	Poetry	Maithili
Raghunath Paleri	Avar Moovarum Oru Mazhavillum	Novel	Malayalam
Ningombam Jadumani Singh	Apunbana Pangalni	Collection of Plays	Meitei (Manipuri)
Sanjay Wagh	Jokar Banala Kingmaker	Novel	Marathi
Sudarshan Ambatey	Jhyaunkiri ra Juunkiri	Poetry	Nepali
Digaraj Brahma	Geeta Kahe Mitar Katha	Poetry	Odia
No Awards			Punjabi
Kirti Sharma	Paani Ra Rukhalaa	Novel	Rajasthani
Asha Agrawal	Kathamadhuri	Short Stories	Sanskrit
Sova Hansda	Hali Mon	Poetry	Santhali
Kishin Khubchandani 'Ranjayal'	Baar Man Thaar	Poetry	Sindhi
Mu. Murugesh	Ammavukku Magal Sonna Ulagin Mudhal Kadhai	Short Stories	Tamil
Devaraju Maharaju	Nenu Ante Evaru?	Play	Telugu
Kausar Siddiqui	Charagh Phoolon Ke	Poetry	Urdu

== See also ==
- Sahitya Akademi Award
- Yuva Puraskar
