= Bal Sahitya Puraskar 2025 =

Children's literature awards in 2025

- Awarded for: Literary awards for children's literature in Indian languages
- Sponsored by: Sahitya Akademi, Government of India
- Reward: ₹ 50,000
- Website: Official website

The Bal Sahitya Puraskar 2025 (transl. Children's literature award), also known as Sahitya Akademi Bal Sahitya Puraskar 2025, is a 2025 literary honour in India, which the Sahitya Akademi, India's National Academy of Letters, annually confers on writers for their contribution in the field of Children's literature in any of the 22 languages of the 8th Schedule to the Indian constitution as well as in English and Rajasthani language. It comprises a cash prize of Rs. 50,000 and an engraved copper plaque.

== Recipients by language ==
Languages	Authors	Works	Genres	References
Assamese	Surendra Mohan Das	Mainaahantar Padya	Poetry	
Bengali	Tridib Kumar Chattopadhyay	Echhara Gaye Katha Daye	Stories	
Boro	Binay Kumar Brahma	Khanthi Boronn Ang Abhu Duhui	Stories	
Dogri	PL Parihar "Shauq"	Nachi Tor	Poetry	
English	Nitin Kushalappa	"Dakshin: South Indian Myths and Fables Retold"	Short Stories	
Gujarati	Kirtida Brahmbhatt	Trivak	Poetry	
Hindi	Sushil Shukla	"Ek Batey Bara"	Short Stories	
Kannada	K Shivalingappa Handihal	Notebook	Short Stories	
Kashmiri	Izhar Mubashir	Shure Ta Toturu Gyash	Short Stories	
Konkani	Nayana Adarkar	Betekaddo Shankar Aani Haar Karyo	Stories	
Maithili	Munni Kamat	Oudika	Short Stories	
Malayalam	Sreejith Moothedath	Penguinukalute Vankarayil	Novel	
Manipuri	Shanto M	Anganganginage Shamahungsida	Play	
Marathi	Suresh Sawant	Aathamanga	Poetry	
Nepali	Sangmu Lepcha	Shanti Van	Novel	
Odia	Rajakishore Parhi	Kete Phula Phutachi	Poetry	
Punjabi	Pali Khadim (Amrit Pal Singh)	Jadoo Patka	Novel	
Rajasthani	Bhogilal Patidar	Panahravansh Ni Pira	Drama	
Sanskrit	Preeti Pujara	Balviyaam	Poetry	
Santali	Haralal Murmu	Sona Mou-ag Sandesh	Poetry	
Sindhi	Heena Agnani 'Heer'	Asman Hari	Poetry	
Tamil	Vishnupuram Sarvanan	Ottrai Sirago Orva	Novel	
Telugu	Gangisetti Sivakumar	Kakurla Devatha	Story	
Urdu	Ghazanfar Iqbal	Quami Sitare	Articles	

== See also ==
- Sahitya Akademi Award
- Yuva Puraskar
