= Bal Sahitya Puraskar 2022 =

Children's literature awards in 2022

- Awarded for: Literary awards for children's literature in Indian languages
- Sponsored by: Sahitya Akademi, Government of India
- Reward: ₹ 50,000
- Website: Official website

The Bal Sahitya Puraskar 2022 (transl. Children's literature award), also known as Sahitya Akademi Bal Sahitya Puraskar 2022, is a 2022 literary honour in India, which the Sahitya Akademi, India's National Academy of Letters, annually confers on writers for their contribution in the field of Children's literature in any of the 22 languages of the 8th Schedule to the Indian constitution as well as in English and Rajasthani language. It comprises a cash prize of Rs. 50,000 and an engraved copper plaque.

== Recipients by language ==
Languages	Authors	Works	Genres	References
Assamese	Diganta Oza	Dangor Manuhor Sadhu	Essays	
Bengali	Joya Mitra	Char Panch Jon Bondhu	Short Stories	
Boro	Langwnani Bokhali Gotho	Devbar Ramchiary	Novel	
Dogri	Rajeshwar Singh ‘Raju’	Sikh-Mat	Short Stories	
English	Arshia Sattar	Mahabharata for Children Fiction	Arshia Sattar	
Gujarati	Kirit Goswami	Khiskoli Ne Computer Chhe Levu	Poetry	
Hindi	Kshama Sharma	Kshama Sharma ki Chuninda Baal Kahaniyan	Short Stories	
Kannada	Tammanna Beegara	Bavali Guhe	Novel	
Kashmiri	Qamer Hamidullah	Daiel	Poetry	
Konkani	Jyoti Kunkolienkar	Mayuri	Novel	
Maithili	Virendra Jha	Uran Chhoo	Short Stories	
Malayalam	Sethu (A. Sethumadhavan)	Chekkutty	Novel	
Meitei (Manipuri)	Naorem Lokeshwore Singh	Tomthin Amsung Khuji	Short Stories	
Marathi	Sangeeta Barve	Piyuchi Vahi	Novel	
Nepali	Meena Subba	Kopilaka Rangharu	Poetry	
Odia	Narendra Prasad Das	Kolahala Na Halahala	Short Stories	
Punjabi	No Awards			
Rajasthani	Vishwamitra Dadhich	Machhlyan Ra Aanshu	Poetry	
Sanskrit	Kuldeep Sharma	Sachitram Prahelikasatkam (Abhinavsanskritprahelikah)	Poetry	
Santhali	Ganesh Marandi	Hapan Mai	Poetry	
Sindhi	Manohar Nihalani	Anokhiyun Aakhaniyun	Stories	
Tamil	G. Meenakshi	Malligavin Veedu	Short Stories	
Telugu	Pattipaka Mohan	Baalala Taataa Baapuji	Poetry	
Urdu	Zafar Kamali	Hauslon Ki Udan	Poetry	

== See also ==
- Sahitya Akademi Award
- Yuva Puraskar
