= Bal Sahitya Puraskar 2020 =

Children's literature awards in 2020

- Awarded for: Literary awards for children's literature in Indian languages
- Sponsored by: Sahitya Akademi, Government of India
- Reward: ₹ 50,000
- Website: Official website

The Bal Sahitya Puraskar 2020 (transl. Children's literature award), also known as Sahitya Akademi Bal Sahitya Puraskar 2020, is a 2020 literary honour in India, which the Sahitya Akademi, India's National Academy of Letters, annually confers on writers for their contribution in the field of Children's literature in any of the 22 languages of the 8th Schedule to the Indian constitution as well as in English and Rajasthani language. It comprises a cash prize of Rs. 50,000 and an engraved copper plaque.

== Recipients by language ==
| Languages | Authors | Works | Genres | References |
|---|---|---|---|---|
| Assamese | Madhurima Gharphalia | Phosong | Short Stories | |
| Bengali | Pracheta Gupta | Gopon Bakso Khulte Nei | Short Stories | |
| Bodo | Ajit Boro | Gothosa Bisombi | Essays | |
| Dogri | Ganga Sharma | Manne Da Buaal | Poetry | |
| English | Venita Coelho | Dead As A Dodo | Fiction | |
| Gujarati | Natwar Patel | Bhurini Ajayab Safar | Short Stories | |
| Hindi | Balswaroop Rahi | Sampurna Bal Kavitayen | Poetry | |
| Kannada | H. S. Byakod | Nanoo Ambedkar | Novel | |
| Kashmiri | Syed Akhtar Hussain Mansoor | Paghich Aash | Poetry | |
| Konkani | V. Krishna Vadhyar | Balu | Novelette | |
| Maithili | Siya Ram Jha 'Saras' | Sonahula Ijotwala Khidki | Poetry | |
| Malayalam | Gracy | Vazhthappetta Poocha | Stories | |
| Meitei (Manipuri) | Naorem Bidyasagar | Uchan Meira | Poetry | |
| Marathi | Aba Mahajan | Abachi Gosht | Short Stories | |
| Nepali | Dhruba Chouhan | Akshar Ujyalo | | |
| Odia | Ramachandra Nayak | Bana Deula Re Suna Neula | Stories | |
| Punjabi | Karnail Singh Somal | Phullan Da Shehar | Travelogue | |
| Rajasthani | Mangat Badal | Kudrat Ro Nyav | Poetry | |
| Sanskrit | Aravind Kumar Tiwari | Balagunjanam | Poetry | |
| Santhali | Joyram Tudu | Bhanj Kul Bhurkah Ipil Sunaram Soren | Biography | |
| Sindhi | Sahib Bijani | Mundee Kera Paaye? | Drama | |
| Tamil | Yes. Balabharathi | Marappachi Sonna Rahasiyam | Novel | |
| Telugu | Kanneganti Anasuya | Snehitilu | Short Stories | |
| Urdu | Hafiz Karnataki | Fakhr-E-Watan | Biography | |

== See also ==
- Sahitya Akademi Award
- Yuva Puraskar
