= Raghunath Murmu =

Indian writer and linguist (1905–1982)

- ᱨᱟᱹᱜᱷᱩᱱᱟᱛ ᱢᱩᱨᱢᱩ
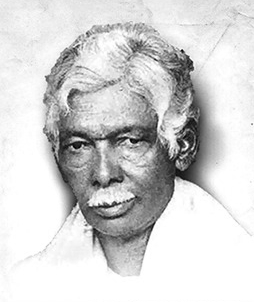
- Portrait of Raghunath Murmu
- Born: 5 May 1905; Dandbose, Rairangpur, Mayurbhanj State, British India (present-day Mayurbhanj, Odisha, India)
- Died: 1 February 1982 (aged 76)
- Occupations: Writer, educator, and playwright
- Children: Sidha Lal Murmu
- Writing career
- Genres: Drama, folklore
- Subjects: Santali literature, Ol Chiki script

Raghunath Murmu (5 May 1905 – 1 February 1982) was an Indian writer, educator, and playwright. He developed the Ol Chiki script for the Santali language.

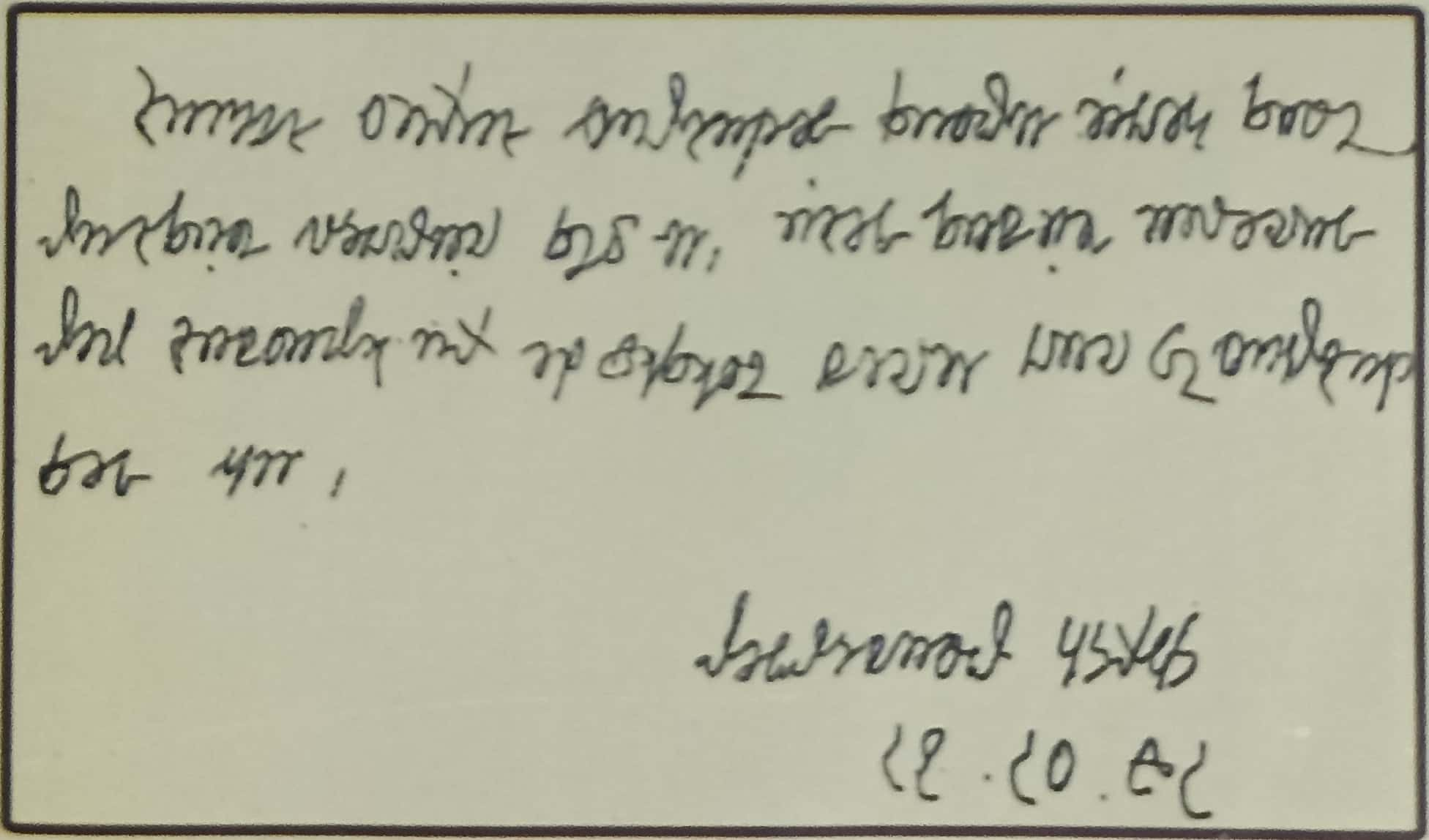
Handwritten quote of Raghunath Murmu

Until the nineteenth century, Santali was primarily an oral language, with knowledge transmitted from one generation to another. Later, European researchers and Christian missionaries used Bengali, Odia, and Roman scripts to document the language. Murmu developed the Ol Chiki script and wrote songs, plays, and school textbooks in the script.

== Biography ==
Raghunath Murmu was born on 5 May 1905, on Baisakhi Purnima, also known as Buddha Purnima. He was born in Dandbose village, also known as Dahardih, near Rairangpur, in Mayurbhanj State, British India, present-day Odisha, India. He was the son of Nandlal Murmu and Salma Murmu. His father, Nandlal Murmu, was a village head and a munshi in the court of King Pratap Chandra Bhanjdeo of Mayurbhanj State. According to the traditional social rituals of the Santal people, also known as the Kherwal community, he was named Chunu Murmu at birth. The priest who conducted the naming ceremony gave him the name Raghunath Murmu.

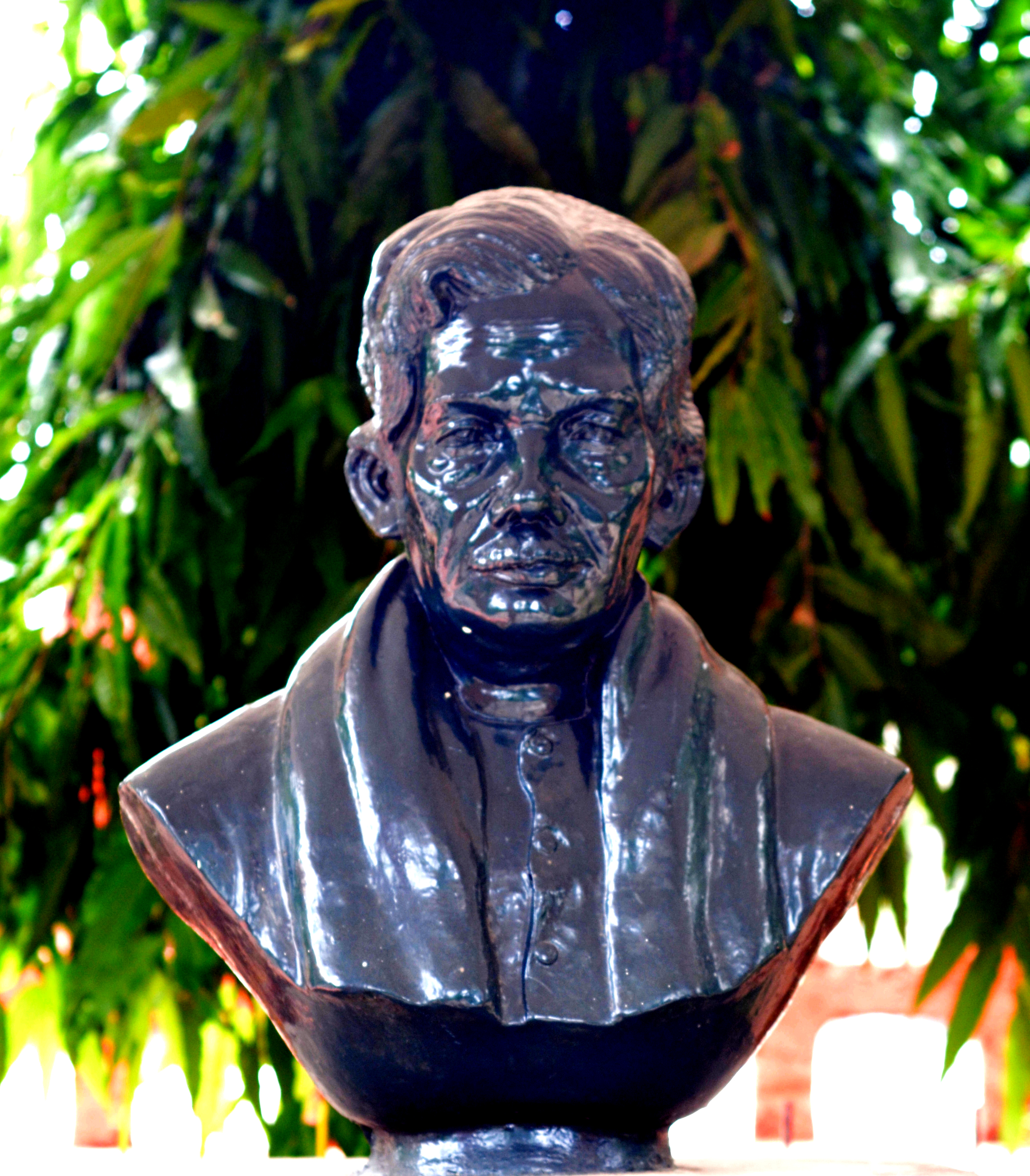
Raghunath Murmu's stone idol at the Odisha Tribal Development Society (OTDS), Bhubaneswar

=== Early life, education, and the invention of the Ol Chiki script ===
At the age of seven, Murmu attended Gambharia U.P. School, an Odia-language school, for his primary education. He later questioned why he was taught in Odia rather than in Santali, his mother tongue. He asked his father to enrol him in a Santali-medium school, but his father told him that Santali had no written script and was an oral language.

In 1914, he was admitted to Bahalda Primary School. As the school was far from his native village, he built a hut on a relative's land in Bana Dungri and stayed there with other boys. During this period, while other children played together in a nearby playground, Murmu spent time studying and experimenting with writing. This is believed to be when he began developing the Ol Chiki script.

He was sent to Baripada, then the capital city of Mayurbhanj State, for further study. He enrolled in the Baripada High School of Mayurbhanj, now M.K.C. High School. There too, he remained interested in developing a language and script for Santali. During school holidays, he returned to his native village, Dandbose. He often spent time alone in a nearby forest called Kapi-Buru, where he went with his notebook and pen. It is said that he created the Ol Chiki script at Kapi-Buru in 1925.

In 1928, he passed his matriculation examination from Patna University. In the same year, he married Noha Baskey, a resident of Jamjora village.

=== Middle life: creation of Santali literature using the Ol Chiki script ===
After his matriculation in 1928, Murmu began working at the Baripada Power House as an apprentice. During this period, he also built his own house at Baripada. Later, P. K. Singh, Dewan of the then Mayurbhanj State, sent him to Serampore, near Kolkata, to receive industrial training. He received technical training at three places in West Bengal: Serampore in Hooghly district, Shantiniketan in Birbhum district, and Gosaba Training Center in South 24 Parganas district. After acquiring the necessary technical education, he was appointed as a teacher at the Baripada Technical Institute. Soon after, he joined the staff of the Badamtalia Primary School in 1933. It is possible that he sometimes used the Ol Chiki script while teaching. One of his students, the son of a carpenter, carved the letters Murmu wrote onto a wooden chapati rolling pin. After ink was applied to the roller, it was rolled over paper to print letters.

The first book in the Ol Chiki script, Horh Sereng, was published in 1936. Murmu published his first play, Bidu-Chandan, in 1942. In the play, he described how Bidu, a god, and Chandan, a goddess, came to earth as human beings and invented the Ol Chiki script to express their love for each other in written Santali. The book was exhibited at a function in Baripada, where the king of Mayurbhanj State was also invited. The king recognised the importance of this newly developed script.

During this period, Murmu stayed at the house of Sudhir Majhi in Bhutadi village, now known as Master Bari. There was also a stage near the house, where the first performance of Bidu-Chandan was staged. Many people came to see the play when it was first performed in his native village. Later, Murmu also taught at the Gambharia, Bahalda, and Rairangpur high schools.

During that period, he visited Santali villages in Mayurbhanj and Jharkhand and taught people to use the Ol Chiki script. In this way, the script reached a large number of Santali people. People began calling him Pandit Raghunath Murmu.

During the Swadeshi independence movement in 1942, Murmu was regarded as a revolutionary while campaigning for the Ol Chiki script. He escaped to his wife's native village, Jamjora, and stayed in hiding. He also continued developing Santali literature using the Ol Chiki script during that time.

On 15 August 1947, India gained independence, and the former princely states were integrated into India. During this period, the demand for a Jharkhand state for Santali-speaking people was also gaining momentum. He was an ardent supporter of the Jharkhand Movement. Police firing occurred during protests supporting the movement at Kharsawan and Gundaria in Mayurbhanj. An arrest warrant was also issued against him when the demand for Jharkhand was raised at the Baripada Tribal Convention.

Murmu left Baripada and went to Karandih Sarjom Tola village, near Jamshedpur. He stayed there in a rented house and began working for Tata Steel in Jamshedpur. He and his friend Sadhu Murmu started spreading knowledge of the Ol Chiki script there. During his travels, Murmu taught villagers how to read and write the Ol Chiki alphabet. He also wrote books for learning Ol Chiki, including Parsi Poha, Parsi Itun, Ranarh, Alkha, and Ol Chemed.

During this period, he also established a religious organisation called Sarna Dharam Semlet, which promoted the ancestral beliefs of the Santals and urged people to identify as adherents of the religion in official records.

=== Later life: honours for his contribution to Santali literature ===
Murmu returned to his native village to spend the final years of his life. He travelled throughout his life to spread the use of the Ol Chiki script, while his mother-in-law took care of his family and home.

In 1956, the All India Sarna Conference was held in Karandih, near Jamshedpur. At this conference, prominent leader Jaipal Singh Munda bestowed on him the title Guru Gomke, meaning "the great teacher". He was also honoured by the Mayurbhanj State Adivasi Mahasabha with the same title.

During this period, his brother-in-law Muniram Baskey gave him a printing machine. Murmu bought metal typefaces from Kolkata and began printing his books in the Ol Chiki script. Under his direction, the weekly magazine Saagen Saakam was printed and distributed to promote Santali literature. The Baba Tilka Majhi Library was also established under his guidance.

Murmu visited many Santali-majority areas in West Bengal, Bihar, Assam, and Odisha and taught people to use the Ol Chiki alphabet through his songs. Gradually, he was able to convince people of the need for the Ol Chiki script. He also started an organisation named the Adivasi Cultural Association in 1953, which was later renamed Adivasi Socio-Educational and Cultural Association (ASECA) to include other tribal communities.

Some people now worship Bidu-Chandan, characters from his drama, as the God of Knowledge. By offering prayers to Bidu, along with his wife Chandan, at the confluence of the Jual and Bhangra rivers near Jhargram, Murmu set the norms and standards that became a traditional ritual in that region. Some people still offer prayers to Bidu-Chandan at the same confluence. He wrote more than 150 plays, short stories, novels, and poems in the Ol Chiki script.

Murmu received several honours for his work in Santali literature and the Ol Chiki script. Ranchi University awarded him an honorary doctorate for his contribution to Santali literature. On 16 November 1979, the Government of West Bengal, then headed by chief minister Jyoti Basu, honoured him with a bronze medal at the Kundbona ground of Hura in Purulia district. An organisation named Dhumkuriya Ranchi also gave him the title D.Litt. The Odia Sahitya Akademi also honoured him for his literary contribution. Professor Martin Orens, an anthropologist at the University of California, described him as a theologian. M. D. Julius Tigga described him as a "great developer and dramatist".

He died on 1 February 1982.

== Notable works ==
Murmu's most notable contribution was the development of the Ol Chiki script. His works include Ol Chemed, a primary syllabus for Ol Chiki; Parsi Poha, on the essential elements of Ol Chiki; Dare Ge Dhon, a drama; Sido Kanhu, a patriotic drama; Bidu-Chandan, a love drama; Kherwal Bir, a patriotic drama; Hital, a work on the Kherwal creation myth; Horh Sereng, a collection of Santali songs; Ronor, a Santali grammar; and Elkha, a work on Santali mathematics. His first book was Hor Serenj, his first play was Bidu-Chandan, and his last book was Rah Andorh.

== Legacy ==
The Government of India included the Santali language in the Eighth Schedule of the Constitution of India on 22 December 2003. After this, several Indian state governments, including those of West Bengal, Jharkhand, Odisha, and Bihar, recognised Santali and introduced it as a medium of instruction at the primary and high school levels in Santal-majority areas. Many universities and colleges in Jharkhand, West Bengal, and Odisha now offer courses in Santali literature using the Ol Chiki script.

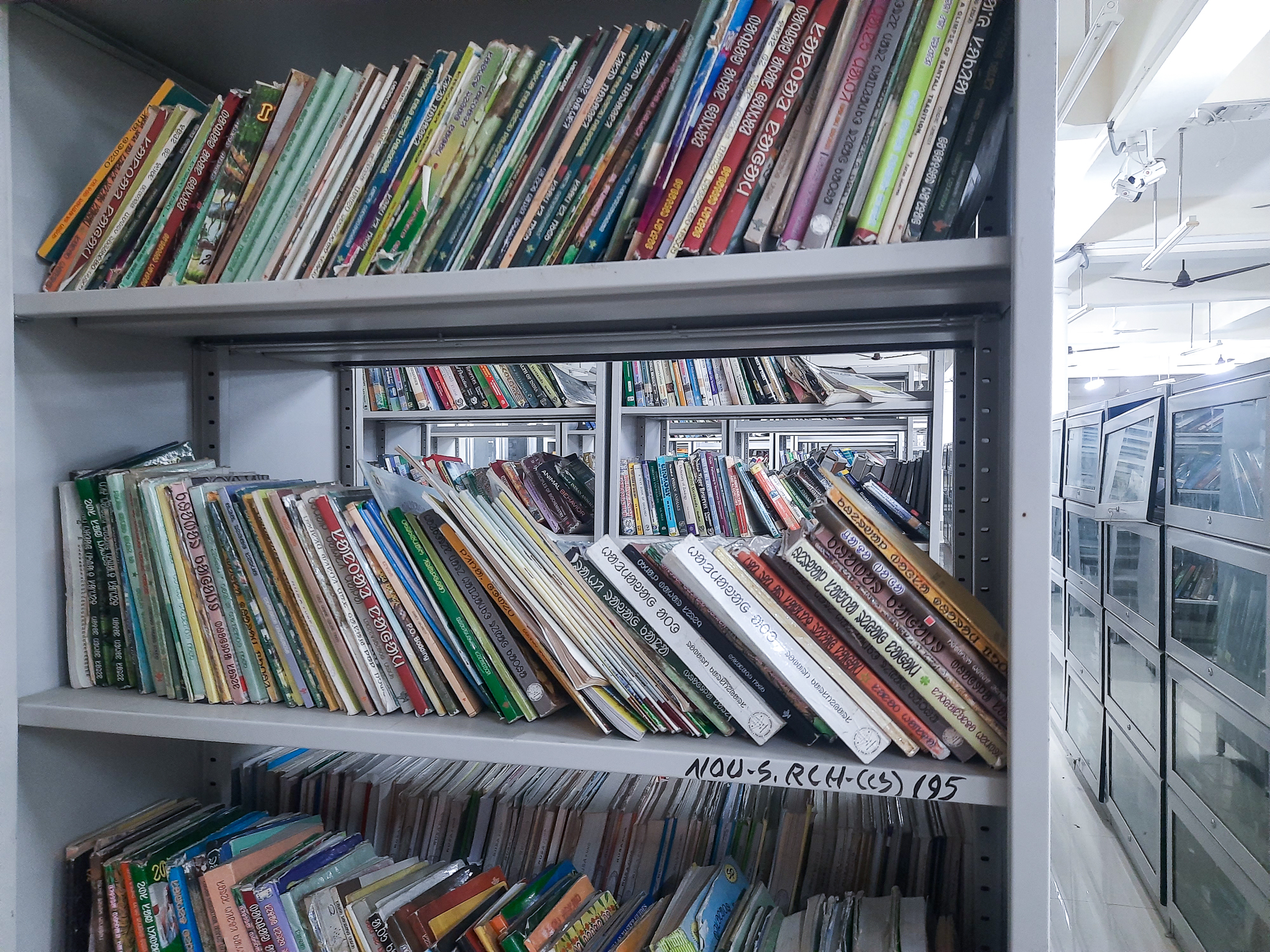
Santali books in the North Odisha University library

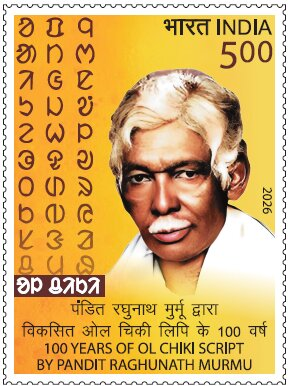

In 2016, the Odisha chief minister declared the birthday of Pandit Raghunath Murmu an optional holiday. The day is observed on the full moon day in May and is popularly known as "Guru Kunami", "Guru Purnima", and "Baishakh Kunami".

Various institutions are named after Raghunath Murmu:

- Pandit Raghunath Murmu Medical College and Hospital, Mayurbhanj, Odisha
- Nayagram Pandit Raghunath Murmu Government College, Jhargram, West Bengal
- Pandit Raghunath Murmu Smriti Mahavidyalaya, Bankura, West Bengal
- Pt. Raghunath Academy Of Santali Cinema & Art, Jamshedpur, Jharkhand
