= Bal Sahitya Puraskar =

Literary honour in India

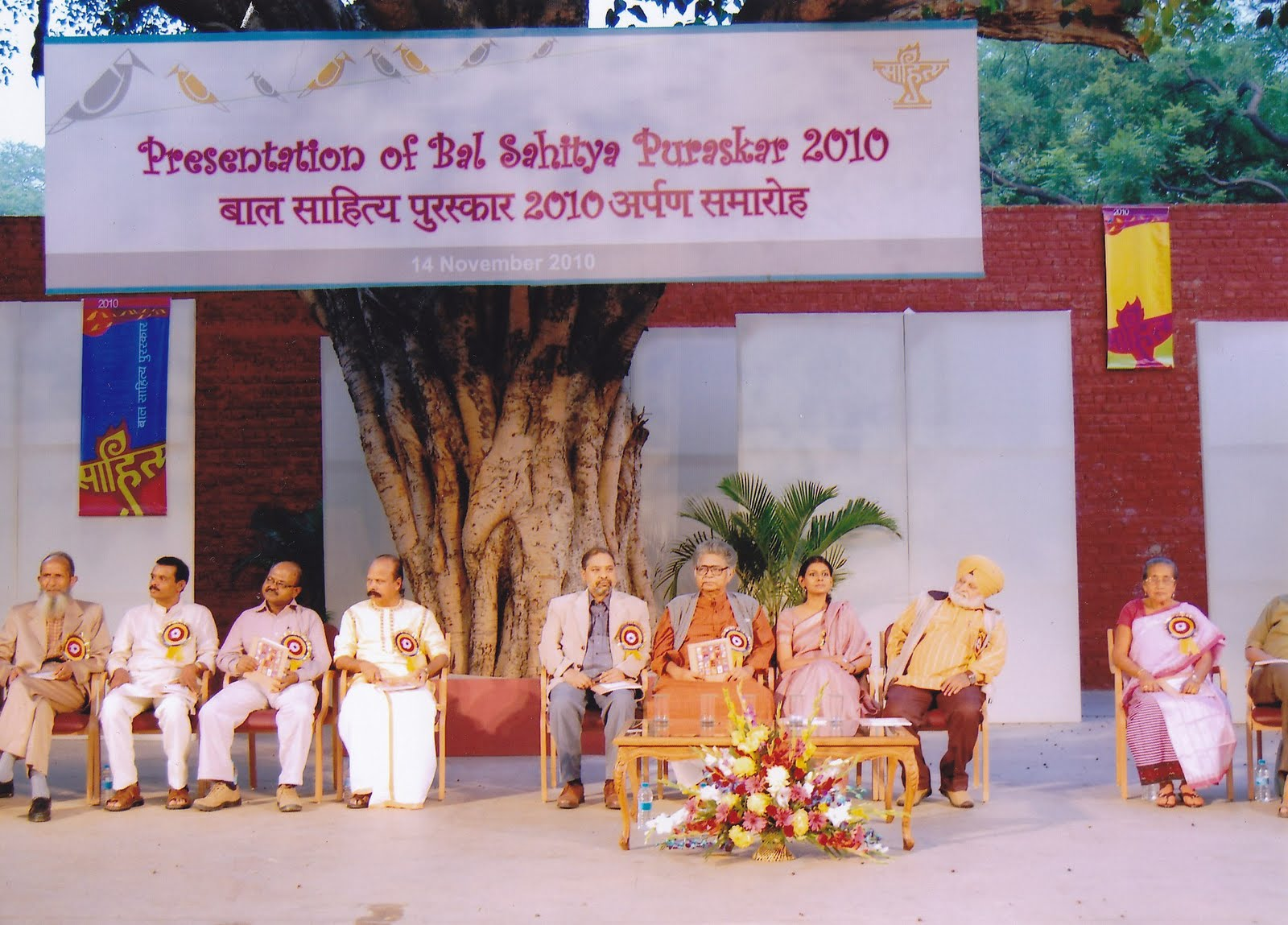
- First Bal Sahitya Puraskar Ceremony, 2010
- Awarded for: Literary award in India
- Sponsored by: Sahitya Akademi, Government of India
- Reward: ₹ 50,000
- First award: 2010
- Final award: 2024

Highlights
- Total awarded: 14
- Website: Official website

The Bal Sahitya Puraskar also known as Sahitya Akademi Bal Sahitya Puraskar, is a literary honour in India, which the Sahitya Akademi, India's National Academy of Letters, annually confers on writers for their contribution in the field of Children's literature in any of the 22 languages of the 8th Schedule to the Indian constitution as well as in English and Rajasthani language. Instituted in 2010, it comprises a cash prize of Rs. 50,000 and an engraved copper plaque.

== Lists of recipients by years ==
- Bal Sahitya Puraskar 2020
- Bal Sahitya Puraskar 2021
- Bal Sahitya Puraskar 2022
- Bal Sahitya Puraskar 2023
- Bal Sahitya Puraskar 2024
- Bal Sahitya Puraskar 2025

== Lists of recipients by language ==
- List of Bal Sahitya Puraskar winners for Assamese
- List of Bal Sahitya Puraskar winners for Bengali
- List of Bal Sahitya Puraskar winners for Bodo
- List of Bal Sahitya Puraskar winners for Dogri
- List of Bal Sahitya Puraskar winners for English
- List of Bal Sahitya Puraskar winners for Gujarati
- List of Bal Sahitya Puraskar winners for Hindi
- List of Bal Sahitya Puraskar winners for Kannada
- List of Bal Sahitya Puraskar winners for Kashmiri
- List of Bal Sahitya Puraskar winners for Konkani
- List of Bal Sahitya Puraskar winners for Maithili
- List of Bal Sahitya Puraskar winners for Malayalam
- List of Bal Sahitya Puraskar winners for Meitei
- List of Bal Sahitya Puraskar winners for Marathi
- List of Bal Sahitya Puraskar winners for Nepali
- List of Bal Sahitya Puraskar winners for Odia
- List of Bal Sahitya Puraskar winners for Punjabi
- List of Bal Sahitya Puraskar winners for Rajasthani
- List of Bal Sahitya Puraskar winners for Sanskrit
- List of Bal Sahitya Puraskar winners for Santali
- List of Bal Sahitya Puraskar winners for Sindhi
- List of Bal Sahitya Puraskar Winners for Tamil
- List of Bal Sahitya Puraskar winners for Telugu
- List of Bal Sahitya Puraskar winners for Urdu

== See also ==
- Sahitya Akademi Award
- List of literary awards
