= Ol Chiki script =

Alphabetic script for Santal people

Ol Chiki; ᱚᱞ ᱪᱤᱠᱤ
- Script type: Alphabet
- Creator: Raghunath Murmu
- Period: 1925–present
- Direction: Left-to-right
- Languages: Santali

ISO 15924
- ISO 15924: Olck (261), Ol Chiki (Ol Cemet’, Ol, Santali)

Unicode
- Unicode alias: Ol Chiki
- Unicode range: U+1C50–U+1C7F

The Ol Chiki (ᱚᱞ ᱪᱤᱠᱤ, Santali pronunciation: [ɔl tʃiki], ɔl 'writing', tʃiki 'symbol') script, also known as Ol Chemetʼ (ᱚᱞ ᱪᱮᱢᱮᱫ, ol 'writing', chemetʼ 'learning'), Ol Ciki, Ol, and Santali alphabet is the official writing system for Santali, an Austroasiatic language recognized as an official regional language in India. It was invented by Pandit Raghunath Murmu in 1925. It has 30 letters, the design of which is intended to evoke natural shapes. The script is written from left to right, and has two styles (the print Chapa style and cursive Usara style). Unicode does not maintain a distinction between these two, as is typical for print and cursive variants of a script. In both styles, the script is unicameral (that is, it does not have separate sets of uppercase and lowercase letters).

The shapes of the letters are not arbitrary, but reflect the names for the letters, which are words, usually the names of objects or actions representing conventionalized form in the pictorial shape of the characters.

— Norman Zide, A portal for Santals

== History ==
The Ol Chiki script was created in 1925 by Raghunath Murmu for the Santali language, and publicized first in 1939 at a Mayurbhanj State exhibition. Unlike most Indic scripts, Ol Chiki is not an abugida, but is a true alphabet: giving the vowels equal representation with the consonants.

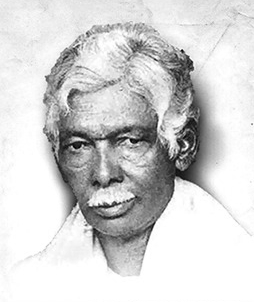
Raghunath Murmu, Creator of Ol Chiki script

Before the invention of Ol Chiki script, Santali was written in Bangla, Devanagari, Kalinga and Latin script. However, Santali is not an Indo-Aryan language and Indic scripts did not have letters for all of Santal's phonemes, especially its stop consonants and vowels, which make it difficult to write the language accurately in an unmodified Indic script.

For example, when missionary and linguist Paul Olaf Bodding, a Norwegian, studied the Santali language and needed to decide how to transcribe it (in producing his widely followed and widely respected reference books such as A Santal Dictionary), he decided to transcribe Santhali in the Roman alphabet: despite his observation that Roman script lacks many of the advantages of the Indic scripts, he concluded that the Indic scripts could not adequately serve the Santali language because the Indic scripts lack a way to indicate important features of Santali pronunciation (such as glottalization, combined glottalization and nasalization, and checked plosives, which can be more easily represented in the Roman alphabet through the use of diacritics.

The phonology of the Santali language had also been similarly analyzed by various other authors, including Byomkes Chakrabarti in Comparative Study of Santali and Bengali and Baghrai Charan Hembram in A Glimpse of Santali Grammar. However, the Ol Chiki alphabet is considered (by many Santali) to be even more appropriate for the language, because its letter-shapes are derived from the sounds of common Santali words and other frequent Santali morphemes: (Note: smallest unit of meaningful speech sound) nouns, demonstratives, adjectives, and verb roots in the Santali language. In other words, each Santali letter's name is, or is derived from, a common word or other element of the Santali language, and each letter's shape is derive from a simple drawing of the meaning of that word or other element. For example, the Santali letter “ol” (representing the sound /l/) is written with a shape originally derived from a simplified outline drawing of a hand holding a pen, because the name of this letter is also the Santali word for “writing.”

== Print and cursive styles ==
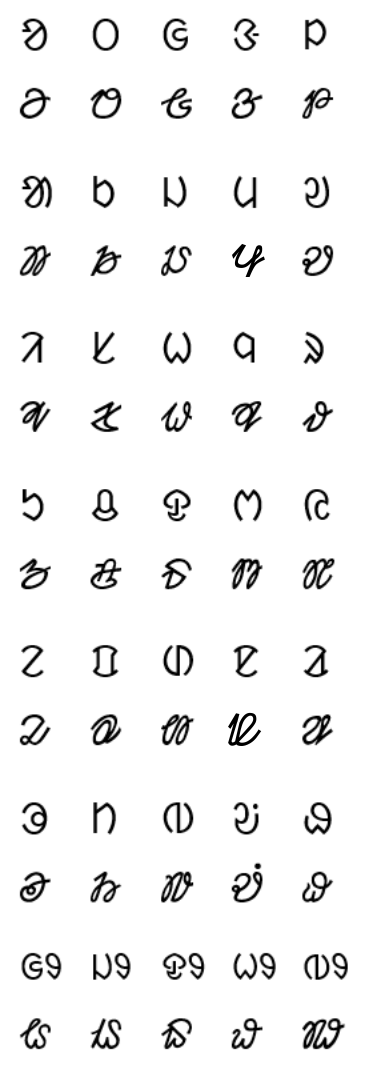
The image shows Ol Chiki Chapa/print and Usara/cursive styles, with the chapa style of each letter written in the first row, and the corresponding usara style in the second row

The existence of these two styles of Ol Chiki was mentioned by the script's creator: Guru Gonke Pandit Raghunath Murmu (also known as Pandit Murmu) in his book Ol Chemed which explains and teaches the Ol Chiki script. (Note: The process is described in Ol Chemed (A Santali Primer), and also in his book Ronod (A Santali Grammar in Santali), in his description of Ol Chiki's chapa and usara styles.) Chhapa (Santali for 'print') is used for publication, while usaraà (Santali for 'quick') is used for handwriting.

=== Chhapa hand ===
Ol Chiki chhapa, or print style, is the more common style for digital fonts, and is used in the printing of books and newspapers.

=== Usaraà hand ===
Usaraà or usaraà ol is the cursive style, and is largely limited to pen and paper, though there are digital usaraà typefaces. Differences include the diacritic ahad, which in print style is used with ᱜ, ᱡ, ᱦ, ᱫ, and ᱵ, all of which can form ligatures with ᱽ in cursive. Further, cursive usaraà seldom uses several letter-shapes which are formed by combining the letter ᱦ and the four semi-consonants ᱜ, ᱡ, ᱫ, and ᱵ with ahad; instead, these are generally written in a shorter form, as ᱷ.

== Letters ==
The values of the Ol Chiki letters are as follows:

Letter	Name	IPA	Transliteration					Shape
Letter	Name	IPA	ALA-LC	Zide	Deva.	Beng.	Odia	Shape
ᱚ	la	/ɔ/	a	ọ	अ	অ	ଅ	burning fire
ᱟ	laa	/a/	ā	a	आ	আ	ଆ	working in the field with a spade
ᱤ	li	/i/	i	i	इ	ই	ଇ	bending tree
ᱩ	lu	/u/	u	u	उ	উ	ଉ	vessel used for preparing food
ᱮ	le	/e/	e	e	ए	এ	ଏ	overflowing rivers changing course
ᱳ	lo	/o/	o	o	ओ	ও	ଓ	a mouth when sounding this letter
ᱶ	ov	/w̃/	ṅ	w̃	ङ	ঙ	ଙ୍	nasalized
ᱠ	aak	/k/	k	k	क	ক	କ୍	bird (sound of a swan)
ᱜ	ag	/g/	g	kʼ	ग	গ	ଗ୍	vomiting mouth, which produces the same sound as the name of the letter
ᱝ	ang	/ŋ/	ṃ	ṅ	ं	ং	ଂ	blowing air
ᱪ	uch	/c/	c	c	च	চ	ଚ୍	peak of a mountain which is usually high
ᱡ	aaj	/ɟ/	j	cʼ	ज	জ	ଜ୍	person pointing towards a third person with the right hand (saying “he”)
ᱧ	iny	/ɲ/	ñ	ñ	ञ	ঞ	ଞ୍	person pointing towards himself/herself with the left hand
ᱴ	ott	/ʈ/	ṭ	ṭ	ट	ট	ଟ୍	camel hump
ᱰ	edd	/ɖ/	ḍ	ḍ	ड	ড	ଡ୍	a man with two legs stretching towards his chest and mouth
ᱬ	unn	/ɳ/	ṇ	ṇ	ण	ণ	ଣ୍	picture of a flying bee (which Is described by Santali speakers as making this sound)
ᱛ	at	/t/	t	t	त	ত	ତ୍	the Earth
ᱫ	ud	/d/	d	tʼ	द	দ	ଦ୍	mushroom or umbrella
ᱱ	en	/n/	n	n	न	ন	ନ୍	threshing grains with two legs
ᱯ	ep	/p/	p	p	प	প	ପ୍	person receiving with both hands
ᱵ	ob	/b/	b	pʼ	ब	ব	ବ୍	curly hair
ᱢ	aam	/m/	m	m	म	ম	ମ୍	person pointing towards a second person with the left hand (saying “you”)
ᱭ	uy	/j/	y	y	य	য়	ୟ୍	a man bending towards the ground to cut something
ᱞ	al	/l/	l	l	ल	ল	ଲ୍	writing
ᱨ	ir	/r/	r	r	र	র	ର୍	sickle used for cutting or reaping
ᱣ	aaw	/w/, /v/	w	w	व	ওয়	ୱ୍	opening lips
ᱥ	is	/s/	s	s	स	স	ସ୍	plow
ᱦ	ih	/ʔ/, /h/	ẖ	h	ह	হ	ହ୍	hands up
ᱲ	err	/ɽ/	ṛ	ṛ	ड़	ড়	ଡ଼୍	a path that turns to avoid an obstruction or a danger
ᱷ	oh	/ʰ/	h	(C)h	ह	হ	ହ୍	a man throwing something with one hand

Aspirated consonants are written as digraphs with the letter ᱷ: ᱛᱷ /tʰ/, ᱜᱷ /gʱ/, ᱠᱷ /kʰ/, ᱡᱷ /jʱ/, ᱪᱷ /cʰ/, ᱫᱷ /dʱ/, ᱯᱷ /pʰ/, ᱰᱷ /ɖʱ/, ᱲᱷ /ɽʱ/, ᱴᱷ /ʈʰ/, and ᱵᱷ /bʱ/.

== Other marks ==
Ol Chiki employs several marks which are placed after the letter they modify (there are no combining characters):

Mark	Name	Description
ᱹ	gạhlạ ṭuḍạg	This baseline dot is used to extend three vowel letters for the Santal Parganas dialect of Santali: ᱚᱹ o̠ /ɔ/, ᱟᱹ ạ /ə/, and ᱮᱹ e̠ /ɛ/. The phonetic difference between ᱚ and ᱚᱹ is not clearly defined and there may be only a marginal phonemic difference between the two. ᱚᱹ is rarely used. ALA-LC transliterates ᱟᱹ as "ạ̄".
ᱸ	mũ ṭuḍạg	This raised dot indicates nasalization of the preceding vowel: ᱚᱸ /ɔ̃/, ᱟᱸ /ã/, ᱤᱸ /ĩ/, ᱩᱸ /ũ/, ᱮᱸ /ẽ/, and ᱳᱸ /õ/. ALA-LC transliteration uses "m̐" after the affected vowel.
ᱺ	mũ gạhlạ ṭuḍạg	This colon-like mark is used to mark a nasalized extended vowel. It is a combination of mũ ṭuḍạg and gạhlạ ṭuḍăg: ᱚᱺ /ɔ̃/, ᱟᱺ /ə̃/, and ᱮᱺ /ɛ̃/.
ᱻ	rela	This tilde-like mark indicates the prolongation of any oral or nasalized vowel. Compare ᱮ /e/ with ᱮᱻ /eː/. It comes after the gạhlạ ṭuḍạg for extended vowels: ᱮᱹᱻ /ɛː/. It is omitted in ALA-LC transliteration.
ᱽ	ahad	This special letter indicates the deglottalization of a consonant in the word-final position. It preserves the morphophonemic relationship between the preglottalized and voiced equivalents of consonants. For example, ᱜ represents a voiced /g/ when word initial but a checked /ˀk/ [ʔ] when in the word-final position. A voiced /g/ in the word-final position is written as ᱜᱽ. The ahad is used with ᱜ, ᱡ, ᱦ, ᱫ, and ᱵ which can form cursive ligatures with ᱽ in handwriting (but not usually in printed text). ALA-LC transliteration uses an apostrophe (ʼ) to represent an ahad.
ᱼ	pharka	This hyphen-like mark serves as a glottal protector (the opposite function as the ahad.) It preserves the checked sound, even in the word-initial position. Compare ᱜᱚ /gɔ/ with ᱜᱼᱚ /ˀkɔ/. The pharka is only used with ᱜ, ᱡ, ᱫ, and ᱵ. It is omitted in ALA-LC transliteration.

== Numerals ==
Ol Chiki has its own numerals:

Hindu-Arabic numerals	0	1	2	3	4	5	6	7	8	9
Ol Chiki	᱐	᱑	᱒	᱓	᱔	᱕	᱖	᱗	᱘	᱙

== Punctuation ==
Some Western-style punctuation marks are used with Ol Chiki: the comma (,), exclamation mark (!), question mark (?), and quotation marks (“ and ”).

The period/fullstop (.) is not used, because it is visually confusible with the gạhạ ṭuḍạg mark (ᱹ).; therefore, instead of periods, the script uses single or two Ol Chiki short dandas:

- ᱾ (mucạd) marks a minor break
- ᱿ (double mucạd) marks a major break

== Computing ==
=== Unicode ===
Ol Chiki script was added to the Unicode Standard in April, 2008 with the release of version 5.1.

The Unicode block for Ol Chiki is U+1C50–U+1C7F:

Ol Chiki^{[1]} Official Unicode Consortium code chart (PDF)
	0	1	2	3	4	5	6	7	8	9	A	B	C	D	E	F
U+1C5x	᱐	᱑	᱒	᱓	᱔	᱕	᱖	᱗	᱘	᱙	ᱚ	ᱛ	ᱜ	ᱝ	ᱞ	ᱟ
U+1C6x	ᱠ	ᱡ	ᱢ	ᱣ	ᱤ	ᱥ	ᱦ	ᱧ	ᱨ	ᱩ	ᱪ	ᱫ	ᱬ	ᱭ	ᱮ	ᱯ
U+1C7x	ᱰ	ᱱ	ᱲ	ᱳ	ᱴ	ᱵ	ᱶ	ᱷ	ᱸ	ᱹ	ᱺ	ᱻ	ᱼ	ᱽ	᱾	᱿
Notes 1.As of Unicode version 18.0

=== Fonts ===
- Google's Noto Sans Ol Chiki.
- Microsoft's font family Nirmala UI.

=== Mixing the two letter styles ===
Although Ol Chiki (Chapa) and Ol Chiki (Usara) are normally never mixed, and the original inventor never mentioned mixing these letter styles, there have been some works that mix both forms, using them like English capital and small letters. However, this innovation is yet to be accepted officially.

=== The invention of a lower case for Ol Chiki ===
Since 2017, Santali graphic designer, typographer, and film producer Sudip Iglesias Murmu has been working on design principles to provide a lowercase alphabet form for Ol Chiki, which would permit Ol Chiki writing and keyboarding to use a two-case, or bicameral, format (Using both uppercase and lowercase), as is done in many other written languages, including the Roman-alphabet languages such as English (all of which were once unicameral scripts, but evolved into a bicameral stage over time). As the development of a lowercase form is contributed to developing a standardized cursive form (in those writing systems which use one), the evolution of lowercase is likely to allow standardizing cursive to the point of making it type able alongside more rigid "block" printed letterforms forms So far, only Ol Chiki (Chapa) letters are used in keyboarding, typesetting, and publishing (in effect, producing capitals-only text for the entirety of all printed or keyboarded documents). In writing quickly by hand, Ol Chiki (Usara) is used: but, despite Ol Usara's potential for reaching high speed, the circulation of Ol Usara documents is negligible, and Ol Usara is yet to receive Unicode standardization, thus leaving it still neglected.

In hopes to remedy this situation and to harmonize the two scripts, Sudip Iglesias Murmu has innovated by creating a series of lowercase letters, which he has integrated with the already existing font of Ol Chiki. According to him, providing lowercase letters increases the efficiency of keyboarding, both for Ol Chiki (Chapa) and for Ol Chiki (Usara), and allows keyboarding to reach the same speed that can be obtained when typing Santali in Roman-alphabet letters, which are likewise case-sensitive. However, his work is yet to be accepted officially.

== Sample Text ==
The following text is Article 1 of the Universal Declaration of Human Rights, written in Santali:

=== Ol Chiki Script ===
ᱡᱚᱛᱚ ᱞᱮᱠᱟᱱᱚ ᱢᱳᱱᱚ ᱟᱨᱚ ᱚᱫᱷᱤᱠᱟᱨᱚ ᱨᱮᱭᱟᱠᱚ ᱟᱫᱷᱟᱨᱚ ᱨᱮ ᱢᱩᱪᱳᱛᱚ ᱫᱷᱟᱵᱤᱪᱚ ᱥᱣᱚᱛᱚᱱᱛᱨᱚ ᱟᱨᱚ ᱥᱩᱢᱟᱱᱚ ᱠᱳ ᱦᱩᱭᱩᱠᱚᱟ ᱾ ᱩᱱᱚᱠᱳ ᱦᱳ ᱵᱩᱫᱫᱷᱤ ᱟᱨᱚ ᱵᱩᱡᱷᱚᱦᱚᱩ ᱠᱳ ᱟᱜᱩ ᱛᱳᱨᱟ ᱵᱟᱠᱟ ᱫᱟᱱᱮᱪᱚ ᱟᱨᱚ ᱢᱤᱠᱚ ᱦᱚᱰᱚ ᱟᱨᱚ ᱫᱳᱥᱟᱨᱚ ᱦᱚᱰᱚ ᱨᱚ ᱟᱯᱱᱟᱨᱚ ᱨᱮᱭᱟᱠᱚ ᱣᱭᱚᱣᱚᱦᱟᱨᱚ ᱦᱩᱭᱩᱠᱚ ᱡᱳᱨᱩᱰᱟ ᱾

=== IPA glossed transcription ===
dʒɔtɔ lekan mon ar ɔdhikar-reakˀ adhar-rɛ mutʃot dhabitʃˀ swɔtɔntrɔ ar suman-ko huju-ʔ=ko=a
all kind human and rights-GEN dignity-LOC birth at free and equal-3PL COP-MID=3PL.SUBJ=IND
'All human beings, with respect to rights and in dignity, at birth free and equal are.'

unko hɔ̃ buddhi ar budʒhhɔ=ko əgu-tor-a baka danetʃˀ ar mitˀ hɔɽ ar dɔsar hɔɽ rɔ apnar-reakˀ jawɔhar huju-kˀ dʒəruɽa
They also intelligence and judgment=3PL.SUBJ bring-with-IND therefore one.another and one man and other person towards own-GEN.INAN behavior COP-MID should
'They also reason and understanding given-with; therefore toward one another, one person toward another person, in their own conduct should act.'

=== English ===
All human beings are born free and equal in dignity and rights. They are endowed with reason and conscience and should act towards one another in a spirit of brotherhood.

== See also ==
- Byomkes Chakrabarti (a Bengali research worker on ethnic languages)
- Santali Latin alphabet
- Turia Chand Baskey
