= List of Sindhi people =

The following is a list of notable Sindhi people who have origins in the Sindh province.

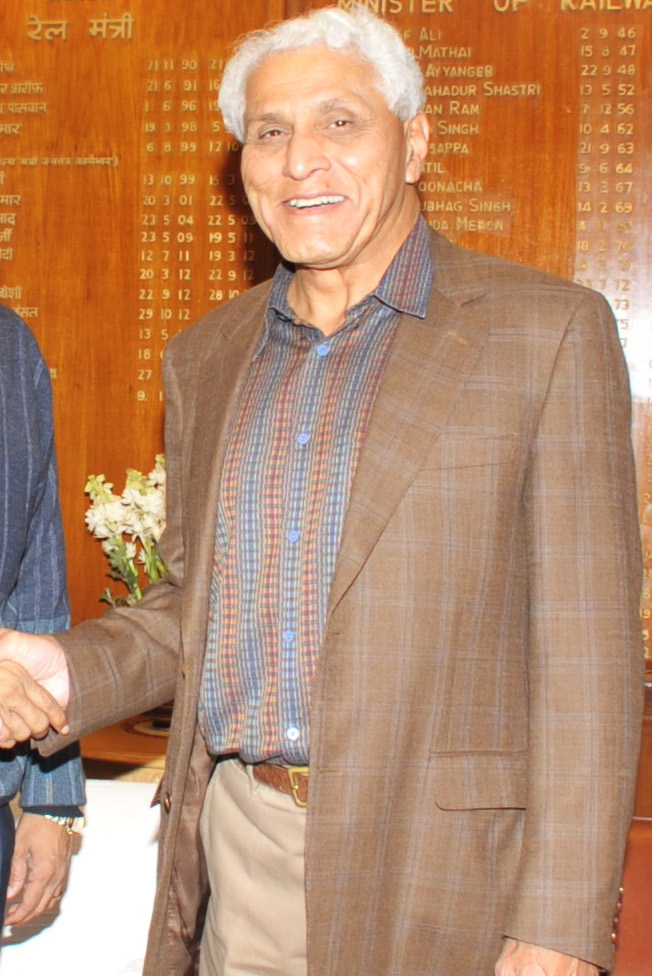
Romesh Wadhwani,former chairman and CEO of Symphony Technology Group

== Businesspeople ==
- Bhai Pratap Dialdas
- Chandru Raheja
- Deepak Perwani
- Diya Joukani
- Gulu Lalvani
- Hari Harilela
- Jahangir Siddiqui
- Kabir Mulchandani
- Kishinchand Chellaram
- Lal Chand
- Lila Poonawalla
- Mahmoud Haroon
- Micky Jagtiani
- Niranjan Hiranandani
- Ram Buxani
- Romesh Wadhwani
- S. P. Hinduja
- Sabeer Bhatia
- Sanjeev Bikhchandani
- Seth Vishandas Nihalchand
- Sital K Motwani
- Sonu Shivdasani
- Surendra Hiranandani
- Sultana Siddiqui
- Sunil Vaswani
- Sunder Genomal
- Sadruddin Hashwani
- Tarun Tahiliani
- Vijay K. Thadani

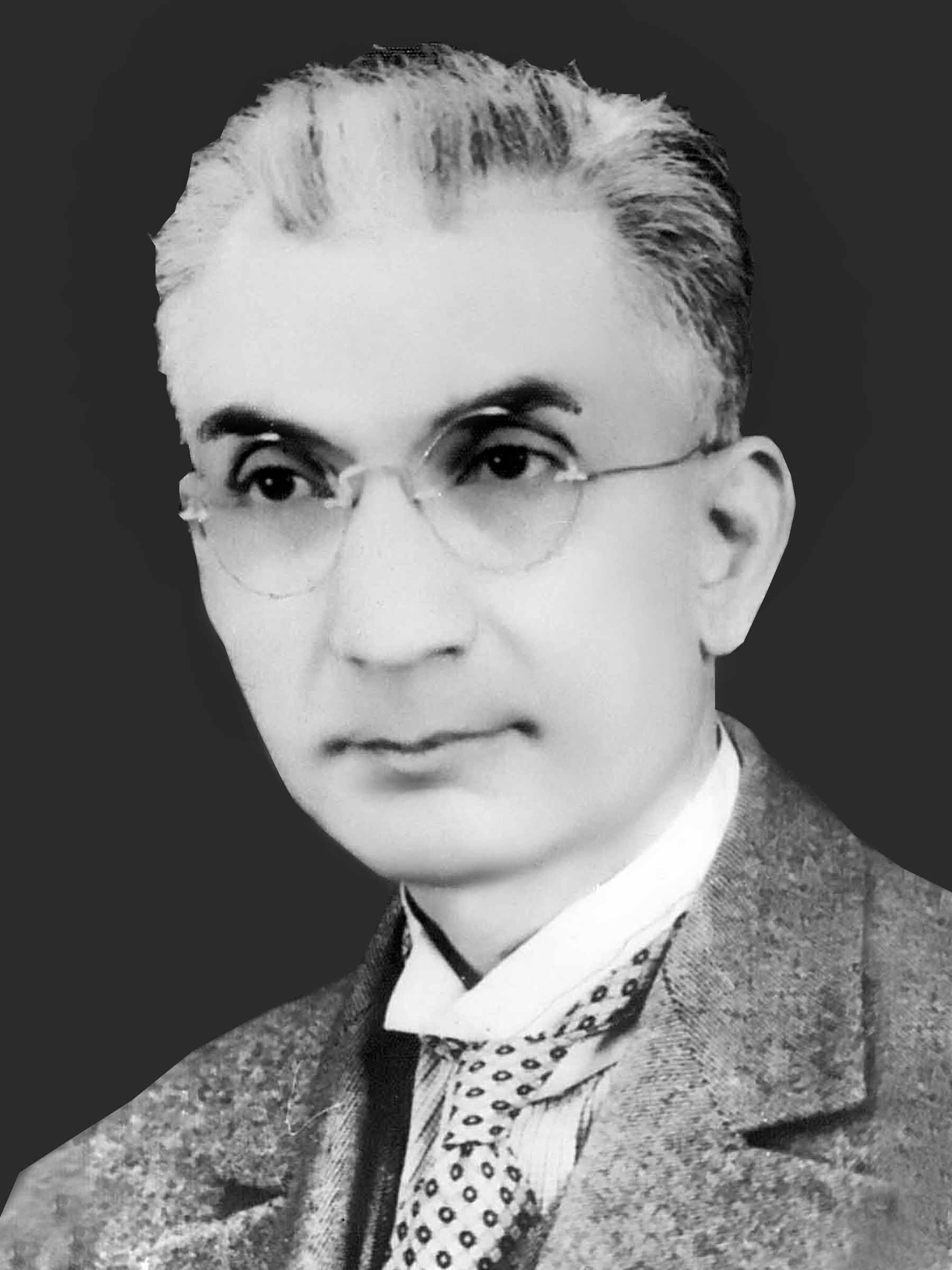
Imdad Ali Imam Ali Kazi,scholar and jurist

== Educators ==
- Ali S. Asani
- Dadi Leela
- Hassan Ali Effendi
- Hotchand Gopaldas Advani
- Imdad Ali Imam Ali Kazi
- Jan Muhammad A. Memon
- K.M. Kundnani
- Kauromal Chandanmal Khilnani
- Ghulam Nabi Kazi
- Mariyam Sultana Noohani
- Motilal Jotwani
- Muhammad Ali Shaikh
- Muhammad Ibrahim Joyo
- Muhammad Siddique Memon
- Nisar Ahmed Siddiqui
- Noor Muhammad Lakhair
- Noshad A. Shaikh
- Sadhu Vaswani
- Shams Abbasi
- Usman Ali Isani

== Entertainment professionals ==
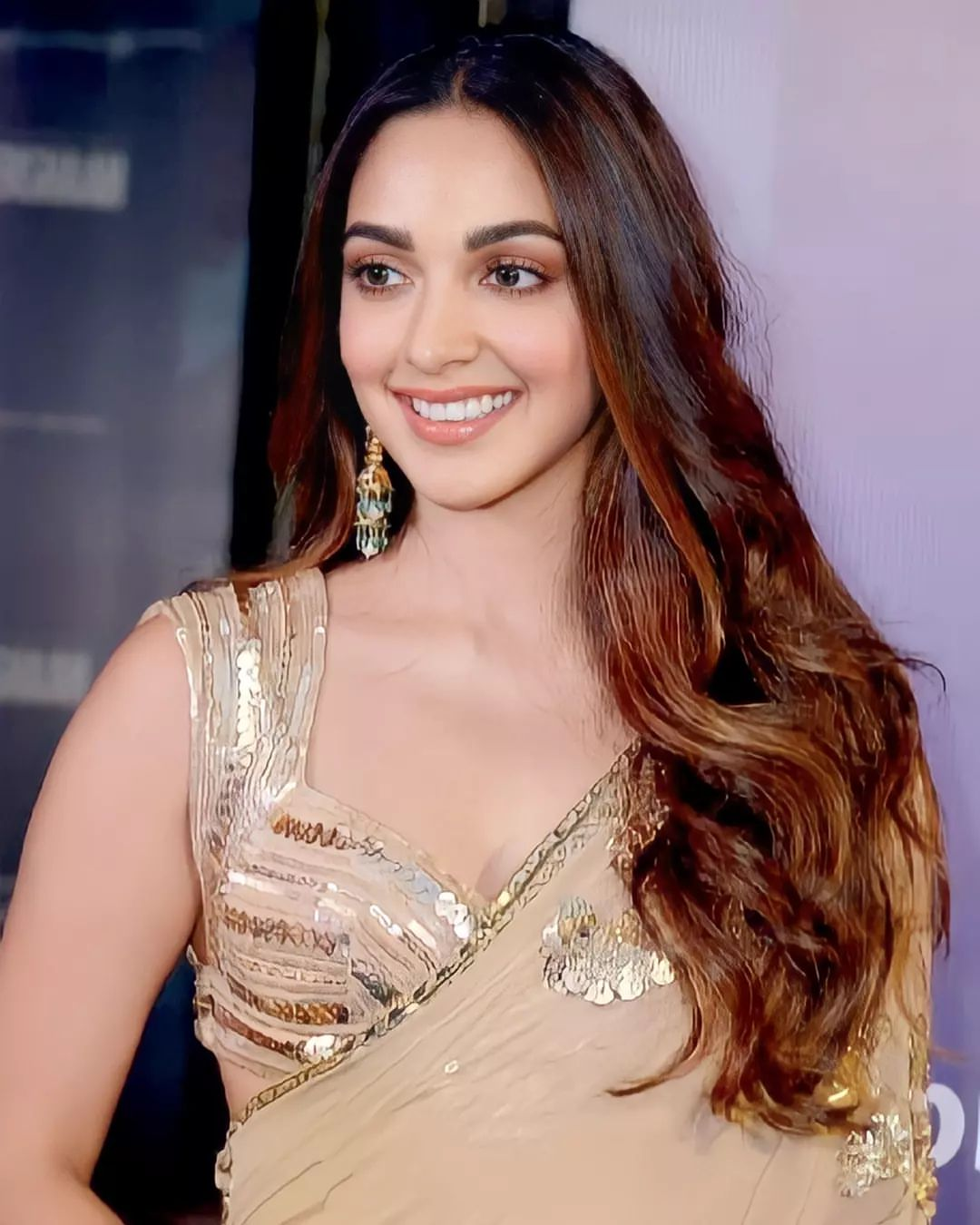
Kiara Advani

Tamannaah Bhatia

=== Indian ===
- Aanand L. Rai
- Aarti Chabria
- Abhimanyu Dassani
- Aftab Shivdasani
- Ajith Kumar
- Ajit Vachani
- Anant Balani
- Anila Sunder
- Anita Hassanandani
- Anjana Sukhani
- Apurva Asrani
- Archie Panjabi
- Arjun Bijlani
- Asrani
- Atul Khatri
- Babita
- Bhudo Advani
- Bulo C Rani
- Dalip Tahil
- Deepshikha Deshmukh
- Dinesh Hingoo
- Dinesh Raheja
- Fardeen Khan
- G. P. Sippy
- Gopi Gajwani
- Govind Nihalani
- Govinda
- Girish Kumar
- Gracy Goswami
- Hari Shivdasani
- Hansika Motwani
- Harsh Varrdhan Kapoor
- Hiten Tejwani
- Jackky Bhagnani
- Jeet
- Jimmi Harkishin
- Lakshya
- Leena Jumani
- Lillete Dubey
- Karisma Kapoor
- Kajal Raghwani
- Kareena Kapoor
- Karan Johar
- Kiara Advani
- Kiran Janjani
- Kitu Gidwani
- Kumar Shahani
- Kushal Punjabi
- Manoj Punjabi
- Mishal Raheja
- Mohan Bhavnani
- N. C. Sippy
- Nandini Rai
- Nandita Mahtani
- Neel Motwani
- Nikkhil Advani
- Nishant Singh Malkani
- Preeti Jhangiani
- Poonam Sinha
- Raam Punjabi
- Raj Kiran
- Rajesh Mirchandani
- Rajkumar Hirani
- Ramesh Sippy
- Ranveer Singh
- Rhea Kapoor
- Richa Moorjani
- Rishi Bhutani
- Ritesh Sidhwani
- Rithvik Dhanjani
- Roma Asrani
- Sadhana Shivdasani
- Sahil Shroff
- Sapna Bhavnani
- Sangeeta Bijlani
- Sanjjana
- Saroj Khan
- Shilpa Saklani
- Shonali Nagrani
- Sindhu Tolani
- Sonakshi Sinha
- Sonam Kapoor
- Tamannaah Bhatia
- Tanuj Virwani
- Tarun Mansukhani
- Usha Bachani
- Vikramaditya Motwane
- Vishal Dadlani
- Vashu Bhagnani
- Vivek Dahiya
- Viveck Vaswani

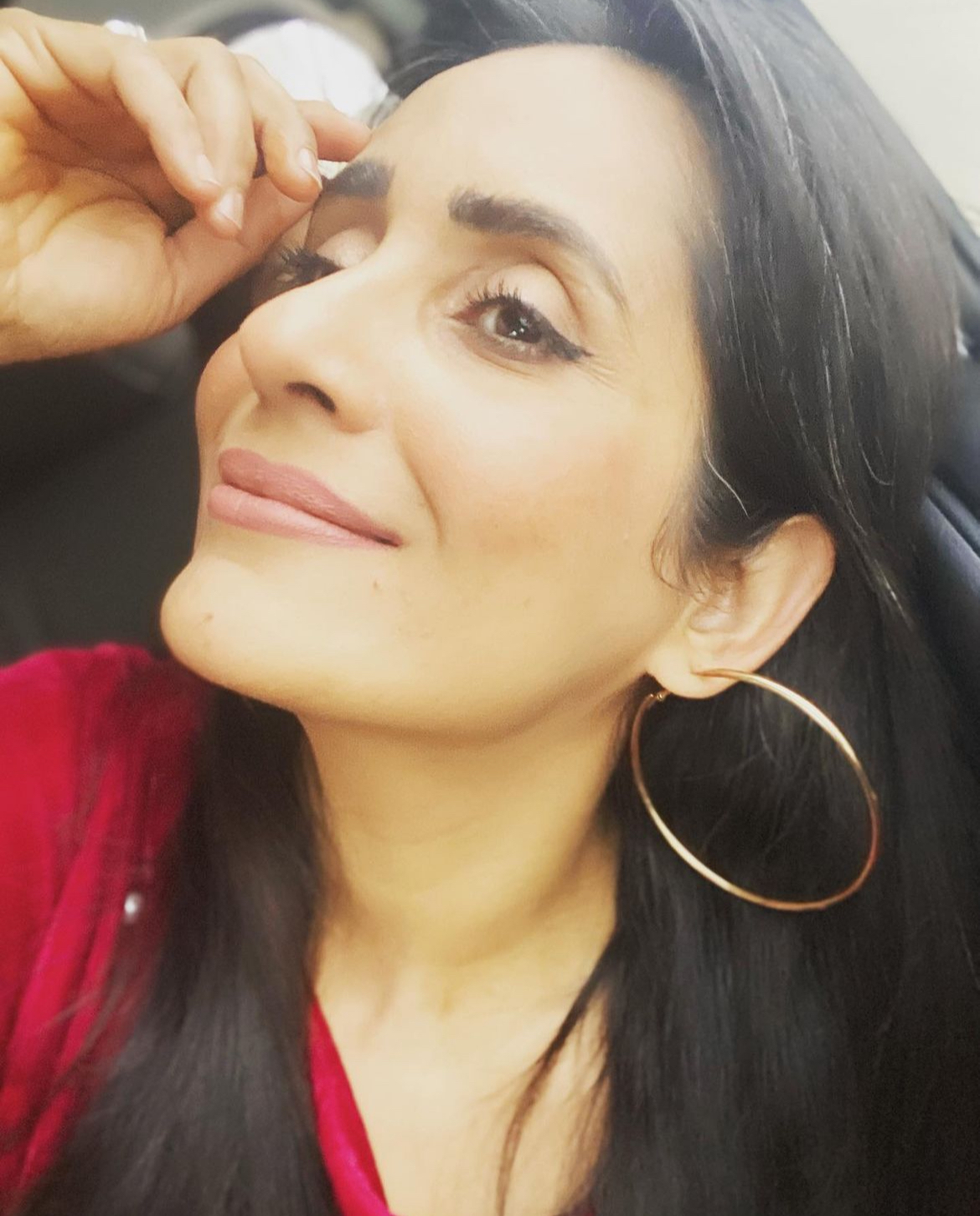
Sabreen Hisbani

=== Pakistani ===
- Anwar Solangi
- Aamina Sheikh
- Ali Gul Pir
- Ayaz Samoo
- Atiqa Odho
- Danish Nawaz
- Fahad Mustafa
- Fatima Effendi
- Fazila Kaiser
- Ghazala Rafique
- Gulab Chandio
- Hayat Ali Shah Bukhari
- Hiba Qadir
- Iqbal Theba
- Iqra Aziz
- Kumail Nanjiani
- Mansha Pasha
- Mustafa Qureshi
- Mushtaque Changezi
- Paras Masroor
- Roshan Atta
- Sabreen Hisbani
- Sakina Samo
- Salahuddin Tunio
- Sanam Baloch
- Sanam Saeed
- Shafi Muhammad Shah
- Shah Asad
- Sheheryar Munawar Siddiqui
- Syed Saleh Muhammad Shah
- Sohai Ali Abro
- Suhaee Abro
- Sonya Hussyn
- Uroosa Qureshi
- Yasir Nawaz

Mir Nasir Khan Talpur,last independent ruler of Sindh

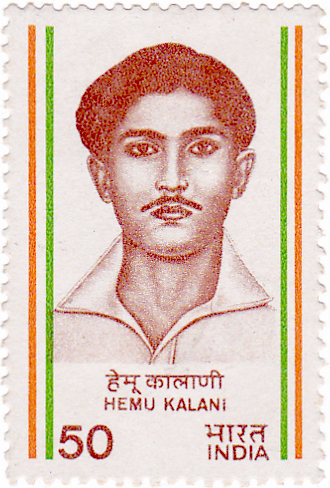
Hemu Kalani,Sindhi revolutionary

== Historical figures ==
- Ali Murad Talpur
- Bhoongar I
- Dahir of Aror
- Dollah Darya Khan
- Ghulam Shah Kalhoro
- Hemu Kalani
- Hoshu Sheedi
- Husseyn Langah
- Hyder Bux Jatoi
- Jam Feroz II
- Jam Nizamuddin II
- Jam Raidhan
- Jam Tamachi
- Jam Unar I
- Mai Gulan
- Mai Khairi
- Mian Nasir Muhammad Kalhoro
- Mian Sadik Ali Khan Kalhoro
- Mian Sarfraz Kalhoro
- Mian Shahul Mouhammed Kalhoro
- Mir Ahmed Nasrallah Thattvi
- Mir Ali Sher Qani Thattvi
- Mir Allahyar Talpur
- Mir Nasir Khan Talpur
- Mir Sher Muhammad Talpur
- Muhammad al-Makki
- Muhammad Muradyab Khan
- Noor Mohammad Kalhoro
- Rai Sahra Langah
- Rooplo Kolhi
- Shah Inayat Shaheed
- Tharo Khan Talpur
- Umar Bin Muhammad Daudpota
- Yar Muhammad Kalhoro
- Zainab Tari

== Journalists ==
- Abhinandan Sekhri
- Ali Kazi
- Dilip Hiro
- Faye D'Souza
- Ghulam Rasool Birhamani
- Madad Ali Sindhi
- Muhammad Bux Johar
- Murtaza Solangi
- Rajesh Mirchandani
- Rajeev Masand
- Sohail Sangi

== Legal professionals ==
- Abdul Ghafoor Bhurgri
- Abdul Hafeez Lakho
- Abdul Hafeez Pirzada
- Agha Rafiq Ahmed Khan
- A. K. Brohi
- Ayaz Latif Palijo
- Bashir Ghulam Nabi Kazi
- H. K. Chainani
- Hamid Ali Mirza
- Harchandrai Vishandas
- Haresh Jagtiani
- Jan Muhammad Junejo
- Mahesh Jethmalani
- Mamoon Kazi
- Mukhtiar Ahmad Junejo
- Mushtak Ali Kazi
- Ram Jethmalani
- Ram Panjwani
- Rana Bhagwandas
- Salahuddin Panhwar
- Syed Sajjad Ali Shah
- Tufail Ali Abdul Rehman
- Vijaya Tahilramani
- Zafar Hussain Mirza

== Military personnels ==
=== Pakistan ===
- Azim Daudpota

=== India ===
- Radhakrishna Hariram Tahiliani

== Presidents ==
=== Pakistan ===
- Zulifaqar Ali Bhutto
- Asif Ali Zardari

Shah Abdul Latif Bhittai,considered to be the greatest Sindhi poet

== Poets ==
- Adal Soomro
- Ahmad Khan Madhosh
- Ali Gul Sangi
- Amar Sindhu
- Anwar Pirzada
- Arjan Hasid
- Ayaz Gul
- Ayaz Jani
- Bherumal Meharchand Advani
- Darbadar
- Elsa Kazi
- G. Allana
- Hassan Dars
- Ibrahim Munshi
- Imdad Hussaini
- Kala Prakash
- Khialdas Fani
- Kirat Babani
- Makhdoom Muhammad Zaman Talibul Moula
- Mir Abdul Hussain Sangi
- Mir Abdul Rasool Mir
- Mirza Qaleech Baig
- Mohammad Khan Majeedi
- Muhammad Faquir Khatian
- Muhammad Mohsin Bekas
- Moti Prakash
- Syed Murtaza Dadahi
- Sobhraj Nirmaldas Sujansingani
- Sabit Ali Shah
- Sufi Budhal Faqeer
- Narayan Shyam
- Pir Hadi Hassan Bux Shah Jilani
- Qadir Bux Bedil
- Qazi Qadan
- Rashid Morai
- Reetika Vazirani
- Rohal Faqir
- Sachal Sarmast
- Sami
- Sarkash Sindhi
- Sawan Fakir
- Shah Abdul Karim Bulri
- Shah Abdul Latif Bhittai
- Shah Inat Rizvi
- Shah Inayat Shaheed
- Shaikh Ayaz
- Sufi Dalpat
- Syed Misri Shah
- Tajal Bewas
- Tanveer Abbasi
- Ustad Bukhari
- Vasdev Mohi

== Politicians and civil servants ==
- Abdul Aziz Junejo
- Abdul Kadir Shaikh
- Abdul Majid Sindhi
- Abdul Qayyum Khan Jatoi
- Abdul Sattar Pirzada
- Abdul Sattar Rajper
- Abdul Wahid Aresar
- Abdullah Ali Shah
- Abdullah Hussain Haroon
- Abid Hussain Bhayo
- Aftab Ghulam Nabi Kazi
- Aftab Shaban Mirani
- Agha Siraj Durrani
- Ahmad Bakhsh Sindhi
- Ahmed Hussain A. Kazi
- Ajiaz Hussain Shah Bukhari
- Ali Ahmad Talpur
- Ali Mohammad Mahar
- Ali Muhammad Rashidi
- Allah Bakhsh Gabol
- Allah Bux Soomro
- Allah Bux Talpur
- Allah Dino Khawaja
- Altaf Hussain Unar
- Ameen Faheem
- Arbab Ghulam Rahim
- Asad Sikandar
- Asghar Ali Shah
- Ashraf Abbasi
- Atta Muhammad Marri
- Ayaz Latif Palijo
- Ayaz Soomro
- Bahadur Khan Dahri
- Bashir Khan Qureshi
- Benazir Bhutto
- Bherulal Balani
- Bhojsing Gurdinomal Pahalajani
- Bilawal Bhutto Zardari
- Dharam Dass Shastri
- Elahi Bux Soomro
- Fahmida Mirza
- Fakeer Sher Muhammad Bilalani
- Faryal Talpur
- Fatima Bhutto
- Fazal Ali Shah
- Fazil Rahu
- G. M. Syed
- Ghazalla Sial
- Ghous Ali Shah
- Ghulam Ali Talpur
- Ghulam Hussain Hidayatullah
- Ghulam Muhammad Khan Bhurgri
- Ghulam Muhammad Khan Mahar
- Ghulam Murtaza Baloch
- Ghulam Murtaza Jatoi
- Ghulam Mustafa Jatoi
- Ghulam Qadir Chandio
- Ghulam Shah Jeelani
- Gul Muhammad Khan Jakhrani
- Gul Muhammad Lot
- Haji Amir Bux Junejo
- Hamida Khuhro
- Hashu Advani
- Hazar Khan Bijarani
- Imdad Chandio
- Imran Zafar Leghari
- Ishwardas Rohani
- Ismail Rahoo
- J. B. Kripalani
- Jairamdas Daulatram
- Jam Khan Shoro
- Jam Madad Ali Khan
- Jam Sadiq Ali
- Jam Saqi
- Jan Muhammad Junejo
- Jethi Sipahimalani
- K. R. Malkani
- Khalid Ahmed Khan Lund
- Khan Muhammad Dahri
- Khuda Bux Rajar
- Khurshid Shah
- Krishna Kohli
- Kulsoom Akhtar Chandio
- L. K. Advani
- Lal Chand Ukrani
- Liaquat Ali Jatoi
- Mahesh Jethmalani
- Mahreen Razaque Bhutto
- Makhdoom Jamiluzaman
- Makhdoom Khalil-u-Zaman
- Makhdoom Mehboob Zaman
- Makhdoom Muhammad Zaman Talibul Moula
- Makhdoom Rafik Zaman
- Makhdoom Saeeduz Zaman
- Mangla Sharma
- Manzoor Wassan
- Marvi Memon
- Maula Bakhsh Chandio
- Maula Bakhsh Chandio
- Meera Sanyal
- Mehmood Alam Jamot
- Mir Ali Bakhsh Khan Talpur
- Mir Bandeh Ali Khan Talpur
- Mir Ghalib Hussain Domki
- Mir Munawar Ali Talpur
- Mir Nadir Ali Khan Magsi
- Mir Rasool Bux Talpur
- Mir Thebo
- Miran Mohammad Shah
- Mohammad Aslam Bhutani
- Muhammad Ayub Khuhro
- Muhammad Bux Khan Mahar
- Muhammad Ibrahim Jatoi
- Muhammad Jadam Mangrio
- Muhammad Khan Junejo
- Muhammad Mian Soomro
- Muhammad Muqeem Khan Khosa
- Muhammad Sajid Jokhio
- Mukesh Kumar Chawla
- Mukhi Gobindram Pritamdas
- Mukhtiar Ahmed Dhamrah
- Mumtaz Bhutto
- Murad Ali Shah
- Murtaza Bhutto
- Mutawakkil Kazi
- N. M. Uqaili
- N. R. Malkani
- Nabi Bux Khan Bhutto
- Nafisa Shah
- Nasir Hussain Shah
- Naveed Qamar
- Naveed Qamar
- Nawab Yousuf Talpur
- Nazeer Abbasi
- Nazeer Ahmed Baghio
- Nirmala Wadhwani
- Nisar Khuhro
- Nusrat Seher Abbasi
- Nuzhat Pathan
- Pir Baksh Junejo
- Pir Ilahi Bux
- Pir Mazhar Ul Haq
- Pir Noor Muhammad Shah Jeelani
- Pir of Pagaro VII
- Pir Shafqat Hussain Shah Jilani
- Pushpa Kumari Kohli
- Qadir Magsi
- Qamar-uz-Zaman Shah
- Qazi Abdul Majeed Abid
- Qazi Faiz Muhammad
- Qazi Fazlullah Ubaidullah
- Qazi Khuda Bakhsh
- Rafiq Ahmed Jamali
- Ram Jethmalani
- Ramesh Kumar Vankwani
- Rana Hamir Singh
- Rasool Bux Palijo
- Rehana Leghari
- Roshan Din Junejo
- Sadiq Ali Memon
- Safdar Ali Abbasi
- Sajid Ali Banbhan
- Sajjad Shar
- Sassui Palijo
- Shagufta Jumani
- Shah Nawaz Bhutto
- Shamshad Sattar Bachani
- Shankar Lalwani
- Shazia Marri
- Shrichand Kriplani
- Sikandar Ali Mandhro
- Sohail Anwar Siyal
- Sucheta Kripalani
- Suhai Aziz Talpur
- Suresh Keswani
- Syed Amir Ali Shah Jamote
- Syed Ayaz Ali Shah Sheerazi
- Syed Irfan Ali Shah
- Syed Jalal Mehmood Shah
- Syed Kazim Ali Shah
- Syed Sardar Ali Shah
- Syed Zafar Ali Shah
- Tanzeela Qambrani
- Vasudev Devnani
- Wahid Baksh Bhutto
- Yusuf Haroon
- Zulfikar Ali Bhutto
- Zulfiqar Ali Behan
- Zulfiqar Ali Shah Jamote
- Zulfiqar Mirza

== Religious leaders and scholars ==
- Abdullah Shah Ghazi
- Abu Ma'shar al-Sindi
- Abu Raja Sindhi
- Abul Hassan Sagheer Sindhi
- Akhund Azizullah Muttalawi
- Ali Khan Abro
- Asadullah Bhutto
- Asaram
- Dada Vaswani
- Dadi Janki
- Hafiz Muhammad Siddique
- Jan Mohammad Abbasi
- Khalid Mehmood Soomro
- Khawaja Muhammad Zaman of Luari
- Makhdoom Bilawal
- Makhdoom Lutufullah AKA Makhdoom Sarwar Nooh
- Mir Ahmed Nasrallah Thattvi
- Mir Ali Sher Qani Thattvi
- Mir Janullah Shah
- Muhammad Hayat al-Sindi
- Molana Azizullah Bohio
- Muhammad Hashim Thattvi
- Muhammad Idrees Dahri
- Muhammad Tahir
- Pir of Pagaro VI
- Pir of Pagaro VII
- Sachal Sarmast
- Shah Inayat Shaheed
- Shah Yaqeeq Bukhari
- Swami Anand Krishna
- Syed Gaji Shah
- Tahir Muhammad Thattvi
- Taj Mahmood Amroti

== Scientists, clinicians and technologists ==
- Abdul-Majid Bhurgri
- Neil Daswani
- Ali Ahmed S Kazi
- Allah Bachayo Talpur
- Bhawani Shankar Chowdhry
- Gul Agha
- Javaid Laghari
- Khem Shahani
- Lakhumal Hiranand Hiranandani
- Muhammad Yar Khuhawar
- Mukhtiar Ali Unar
- M. H. Panhwar
- Rajeev Motwani
- Sanjay Gupta
- S. M. Qureshi
- Suresh H. Advani
- Syed Wadal Shah
- Umesh Vazirani
- Vijay Vazirani
- Krishan Sabnani

== Singers ==
- Abida Parveen
- Allah Dino Khaskheli
- Allah Dino Noonari
- Allah Wasai
- Allan Fakir
- Asim Azhar
- Ali Gul Pir
- Arshad Mahmood
- Bhagat Kanwar Ram
- Bhagwanti Navani
- Dhol Faqeer
- Feroz Gul
- Fozia Soomro
- Humaira Channa
- Hussain Bakhsh Khadim
- Jalal Chandio
- Jamal-ud-Din Faqir
- Kamla Keswani
- Mai Bhagi
- Mai Dhai
- Manzoor Sakhirani
- Master Chander
- Master Muhammad Ibrahim
- Muhammad Juman
- Muhammad Yousuf
- Noor Bano
- Pinky Maidasani
- Rubeena Qureshi
- Saif Samejo
- Sadiq Fakir
- Sanam Marvi
- Sarmad Sindhi
- Shazia Khushik
- Suhrab Faqir
- Vishal Dadlani
- Zarina Baloch
- Zeb-un-Nissa
- Zeenat Siddiqui

== Social activists ==
- Arfana Mallah
- Dayaram Gidumal
- Fatima Bhutto
- Hajiani Lanjo
- Jawayd Bhutto
- Khalida Brohi
- Mai Bakhtawar
- Nazo Dharejo
- Sadhu Hiranand
- Umme Rubab Chandio
- Veeru Kohli

== Sportspeople ==
- Abdul Rashid Qambrani
- Gulabrai Ramchand
- Hussain Shah
- Naoomal Jeoomal
- Narendra Hirwani
- Pankaj Advani
- Rajesh Ramesh
- Shahnawaz Dahani
- Zahid Mahmood
- Hemang Badani

== Writers ==
- Abbas Korejo
- Abdul Jabbar Junejo
- Abdul Qadir Junejo
- Agha Saleem
- Akbar Jiskani
- Ali Baba
- Ali Muhammad Rashidi
- Allah Baksh Sarshar Uqaili
- AllahDad Bohyo
- Amar Jaleel
- Ameer Bux Shar
- Anwar Pirzada
- Atta Muhammad Bhanbhro
- Atta Mohammad Hami
- Attiya Dawood
- Badam Natawan
- Bedil Masroor
- Bherumal Meharchand Advani
- Bina Shah
- Din Muhammad Wafai
- Fahmida Hussain
- Fatima Bhutto
- Gobind Malhi
- Ghulam Ali Allana
- Ghullam Hyder Mehjoor Solangi
- Ghulam Mohammad Grami
- Ghulam Mustafa Qasmi
- Ghulam Rabbani Agro
- Hakeem Fateh Mohammad Sehwani
- Haleem Brohi
- Harish Vaswani
- Hassam-ud-Din Rashidi
- Hotchand Molchand Gurbakhshani
- Hyder Ali Leghari
- Imdad Ali Imam Ali Kazi, Allama
- Ishaq Samejo
- Jamal Abro
- Jethmal Parsram Gulrajani
- Kalyan Bulchand Advani
- Kamal Jamro
- Kala Prakash
- Kaleemullah Lashari
- Kalyan Bulchand Advani
- Khair-un-Nissa Jaffery
- Kirat Babani
- Lalchand Amardinomal
- M. H. Panhwar
- Mangharam Udharam Malkani
- Mazhar Abro
- Mian Bakhsh Laghari
- Mir Masoom Bakhri
- Mirza Qaleech Baig
- Molana Azizullah Bohio
- Molvi Ahmed Mallah
- Mohan Deep
- Mohan Kalpana
- Moti Prakash
- Motilal Jotwani
- Muhammad Hashim Thattvi
- Muhammad Hayat al-Sindi
- Muhammad Idrees Dahri
- Muhammad Siddique Musafir
- Muhammad Usman Diplai
- Mumtaz Rashidi
- Nabi Bakhsh Baloch
- Namdev Tarachandani
- Naseem Kharal
- Naseem Thebo
- Niranjan Khilnani
- Noor Afroz Khuwaja
- Noorul Huda Shah
- Parwano Bhatti
- Popati Hiranandani
- Ram Panjwani
- Rashid Sabir
- Razzaq Mahar
- Rita Kothari
- Shabnum Gul
- Shaikh Ayaz
- Shaukat Shoro
- Shamsher-ul-Hyderi
- Shamsuddin Bulbul
- Sirajul Haq Memon
- Sobho Gianchandani
- Sobhraj Nirmaldas Sujansingani
- Sumaira Zareen
- Sundri Uttamchandani
- Syed Ghulam Mustafa Shah
- Taj Sehrai
- Tarique Ashraf
- Vasdev Mohi
- Zeenat Abdullah Channa
- Zulfiqar Ali Bhatti
- Zulfiqar Halepoto

== Others ==
- Abdul Karim Solangi
- Akbar Khamiso Khan
- Alam Channa
- Ali S. Asani
- Allah Bachayo Khoso
- Dheeraj Hinduja
- Gopichand Hinduja
- Gul Muhammad Khatri
- Karam Hinduja
- Khamiso Khan
- Mahirwan Mamtani
- Mai Jindo
- Manu Bheel
- Marium Mukhtiar
- Misri Khan Jamali
- Mitha Khan Zardari
- Mohammad Ali Talpur
- Nalini Malani
- Parmanand Hinduja
- Prakash Hinduja
- Sonu Shamdasani
- S. P. Hinduja

== See also ==
- List of Sindhi-language films
- Sindhi languages
- List of Sindhi-language newspapers
- List of Sindhi-language television channels
- Sindhi-language media
- List of Sindhi Hindu festivals
- Sindhi Americans
