= Sindhi Shaikh =

Family name

Shaikh or Sheikh
Regions with significant populations
- Sindh and India

Languages
- Sindhi; Urdu; (Only for official reasons)

Religion
- Islam

Related ethnic groups
- Sindhi Memon; Sindhi Khuwaja; Punjabi Shaikh; Shaikh

Shaikh or Sheikh (Sindhi: شيخ), is a Sindhi tribe or caste. The "Shaikh" word is an Arabic term meaning elder of a tribe, lord, revered old man, or Islamic scholar. The Shaikhs of Sindh are one of the major tribe of the Sindhi Muslims ethnic group; they are converted from Sindhi Hindu Lohana/Brahmin tribes. They speak the various dialects of Sindhi, depending on their place of residence. The Shaikh are largely an urban community, residing in the towns and cities of Sindh. Shaikhs have different communities within them, namely Baghdadi, Sanjogi, Nangani, Deewan, and Chatani.

== Origin ==
In Sindh, it is used as an ethnic title generally attributed to converted Hindu trading families that became Muslims.

== Notable people ==
- Khan Bahadur Shaikh Sir Ghulam Hussain Hidayatullah KCSI, Pakistani politician from Sindh, first Chief Minister of Sindh (1937–1938), fifth Chief Minister of Sindh (1942–1947), first muslim Governor of Sindh (1947–1948)
- Shaikh Ayaz (1923–1997), Sindhi poet of Pakistan
- Marium Mukhtiar (1992–2015), first lady pilot of Pakistan, died while on duty
- Najmuddin Shaikh (born 1939), former Foreign Secretary, Pakistan
- Imtiaz Ahmed Shaikh, MPA Shikarpur Pakistan people's party PS 11
- Noshad A. Shaikh, Medical practitioner and academic person
- Shaikh Abdul Majeed Sindhi, Writer, politician and journalist
- Abdul Hafeez Shaikh, Pakistani economist and politician
- Abdul Kadir Shaikh, Pakistani politician (1926–2008)
- Nauman Islam Shaikh, Pakistani politician
- Muhammad Ali Shaikh, Academic person
- Haleem Adil Sheikh, Pakistani politician
