= Solangi =

Solangi (Sindhi: سولنگي) is a Sindhi Sammat tribe that is mostly found in Sindh and South Punjab. They are located in different districts of eastern Balochistan, southern Punjab and northern Sindh.

== Notable people ==
- Abdul Karim Solangi, Pakistani artist
- Anwar Solangi, Pakistani television and radio perform
- Ghullam Hyder Mehjoor Solangi, Sindhi historian
- Murtaza Solangi, Pakistani journalist

== See also ==
- Solang Valley
