= Kalyan Bulchand Advani =

Indian writer

- Born: 10 December 1911; Hyderabad, Bombay Presidency, British India
- Died: 17 March 1994 (aged 82); Bombay, Maharashtra, India
- Education: D.G. National College
- Occupations: Scholar, researcher, poet
- Writing career
- Genres: Prose, poetry
- Notable works: Edition of Shah Jo Risalo, translation of Shakuntala, books on Shah, Sachal and Sami
- Notable awards: Gold Medal (1958) from Sahitya Akademi; Sahitya Akademi Award (1968)

Kalyan Bulchand Advani (10 December 1911 - 17 March 1994) was an Indian poet, critic, and scholar of Sindhi literature. He compiled an edition of the Shah Jo Risalo in 1958 and translated Kalidas's work Shakuntala in Sindhi. He was awarded the Sahitya Akademi Award by the Government of India in 1968.

== Biography ==
Kalyan Advani was born on 10 December 1911 at Hyderabad, Sindh. After the partition of the subcontinent, he migrated to India in 1948 and joined Jai Hind College Bombay (now Mumbai). There, he retired as a Professor of English and Persian in 1976.

== Literary Contributions ==
Kalyan Advani contributed articles to the college magazine Phuleli. After joining as a lecturer, he started a magazine Latifi Bari, named after the saint and poet Shah Abdul Latif Bhitai. He regularly contributed to the literary magazines Sindhu, Latifi Bari, and others.

His first award-winning literary contribution came in 1946. This was the translation of Kalidasa's drama Shakuntala into Sindhi Language. In 1951, his book "Shah" was published.It covered various aspects of Shah Abdul Latif Bhitai's poetry. This was followed by similar work on Sachal (1953) and Sami (1954). His work "Shah Jo Risalo" appeared in 1958.

Kalyan Advani was a poet himself. His poetry collection Raz-o-Niaz was published in 1960. His two English monograms, "Shah Latif" and "Sachal Sarmast" were published in 1970 and 1971, respectively. In 1973, he published a translation of Deewan Muhiuddin from Persian to Sindhi.

In 1970, he was part of the Indian delegation of writers to France, sent by the Government of India. He was a member of Sindhi Advisory Board of the prestigious Sahitya Academy. and a member of the Board of Studies of Sindhi departments of Mumbai and Pune Universities.

== Awards ==
He received Sahitya Academy Award for his compilation of the Shah Jo Risalo in 1968. He also received a Gold Medal from the Sahitya Akademi for the same work in 1958.

== Death ==
Kalyan Advani died on 17 March 1994 in Mumbai.
