= Shamsuddin Bulbul =

Sindhi poet, prose writer, journalist, social worker and politician

Raees Shamsuddin Bulbul Sindhi: شمس الدين بلبل
- Born: Raees Muhammad Paryal Sheeno; 21 February 1857; Mehar, Dadu District, Bombay Presidency
- Died: 13 September 1919 (aged 62); Mehar
- Education: Madarsa Paat shareef
- Occupations: journalist, landlord, Bench chairman Magistrate
- Writing career
- Pen name: "بلبل"
- Genre: Aesthetic
- Subjects: Poetry, journalism
- Notable awards: شمس العلماءُ ، ملَڪُ الشعراءِ سنڌ
- Literary movement: Progressive
- Website: sbf-pk.org

Raees Shamsuddin Bulbul (born 21 February 1857, original name Raees Muhammad Paryal) (Sindhi: شمس الدين بلبل) was a poet, prose writer, journalist, social worker and politician. He was born at Mehar, Dadu District, Sindh. His real name was changed to Shamsuddin on the advice of his Maternal Uncle (Aakhoond Nehal khan) . "Bulbul" was his pen name.

== Early life ==
Raees Shamsuddin bulbul was educated in Sindhi, Arabic and Persian. He was a superintendent in the Engineering irrigation department for a short time. He moved to Lahore for one year then moved to New Delhi for one year. After that he migrated to Hyderabadb dakhan for nine years and starts his career as editor in Dakhan punch, khursheed Dakhan, panja e foulad, then moved back to sindh in his Village Mehar, sindh in 1889 . In Karachi, sindh he met Hassan Ali Effendi who appointed him as an editor in Muawin ul Islam newspaper. After Death of his elder brother Raees peer buksh khan he come back to pavilion and take care of their fields He died on 13 September 1919.

== Literary career ==
During this period, his philosophical essays were published. He was editor in Lahore then subneditor in New Delhi then Editor in Hyderabad dakhan He was founder of sindhi prose, and also founder of generalism in sindhi prose and also called Baba e sahafat (صحافت جو ڏاڏو آدم) He also provided services for the “Sindh Muhammadan Association”. He made people realize that Muslims must unite and, through his poetry, he taught Muslims to take the right path. After the death of Hassan Ali Effendi, Shamsuddin became sub editor of Daily Khair Khuwa (Larkana), Daily Musafir (Hyderabad) and Daily Aftaab (Sukkur). It is said that he introduced humor to Sindhi poetry. He was one of those who are remembered as pioneers of Modern Sindhi Literature. He founded Madarast ul Islam in Mehar in 1906.

== Publication ==
His poetic collection was published by Sindhi Adabi Board in 1969.

== Shamsudin Bulbul Foundation ==
For the betterment of education in remote areas of Sindh, Bulbul's family runs the Shamsudin Bulbul Foundation in Jamshoro, Sindh.

== Death ==
He died on 13 September 1919.
