= Zeenat Siddiqui =

Pakistani singer

Zeenat un-Nisa Siddiqui
- زینت النساء صديقي
- Born: 20 June 1947 (age 78); Matiari, Sind, Pakistan
- Education: Bachelor of Arts
- Alma mater: Zubaida Girls College, Hyderabad
- Occupation: Folk singer
- Years active: 1960s–2010s
- Spouse: Liaquat Ali Akhund
- Children: 3 daughters and 1 son (deceased)
- Father: Akhund Fazal Siddiqui

Zeenat un-Nisa Siddiqui (Sindhi: زینت النساء صديقي, born 1947) is a folk singer of Sindh. Born in Matiari, Sindh, she is famous for her soulful folk songs.

== Biography ==
Zeenat Siddiqui was born in 1947 in Matiari, Sindh, Pakistan. Her father, Akhund Fazal Siddiqui, was a poet, and they were descendants of the Murids of Shah Abdul Latif Bhittai. She received her primary education in Matiari and Hyderabad and passed the matriculation examination from Government Miran School in Hyderabad, Sindh. Zeenat Siddiqui earned a Bachelor of Arts degree from Zubaida Girls College in Hyderabad.

She began singing hamds, naats, and folk songs during school functions when she was in the seventh grade. Her teachers, Razia Panah Ali Shah and Mrs. Mumtaz Qureshi, encouraged her singing talent. She was introduced to Radio Pakistan Hyderabad by the producer, Ghulam Hussain Shaikh. As a college student, she recorded following two songs at Radio Pakistan Hyderabad:

- Menhan Waseen Toon Chho na, Meahan waseen Chho na (Sindhi: مينھن وسين تون ڇو نہ مينھن وسين ڇو)
- Hor wahiyo ray ho, hor ta tuhinjay bhairan jo (Sindhi: ھور وھيو ڙي ھور، ھور تہ تنھنجي ڀائرن جو)

She had a son named Asim Ali Akhund, who was a renowned socialist speaker and philosopher from Hyderabad. He had children in Russia but has since passed away.

She received musical training from Master Muhammad Ibrahim, Ustad Pretamdas and Dadi Leela Vati. Her folk songs gained significant popularity among radio listeners. Additionally, she would recite naats during Meelads and other religious gatherings.
