= Arjan Hasid =

Indian Sindhi language poet (1930–2019)

- Born: Arjan Jethanand Tanwani; 7 January 1930; Karachi, British India
- Died: 26 December 2019 (aged 89); Ahmedabad, Gujarat, India
- Education: University of Bombay
- Occupation: Poet
- Spouse: Parpati (m. 1947; died 2016)
- Writing career
- Pen name: Arjan Hasid
- Language: Sindhi
- Notable awards: Sahitya Akademi Award (1985); Sahitya Akademi fellowship (2013)

Arjan Tanwani (7 January 1930 ― 26 December 2019), popularly known by his pen name Arjan Hasid, was an Indian Sindhi language poet who had authored seven collections of poems and ghazals. He won the Sahitya Akademi Award in Sindhi in 1985 for his collection of ghazals Mero Siji (1984) and was conferred with the Sahitya Akademi fellowship in 2013, the highest honour of the Sahitya Akademi.

== Biography ==
Arjan Jethanand Tanwani was born in Karachi (now in Pakistan) on 7 January 1930 in a Sindhi family. He participated in the Quit India Movement and was a Secretary of Students's Union at Kandiaro High School. In 1947, he matriculated from Bombay University. After the Partition of India, after brief stay in Bombay (now Mumbai) and Jaipur, his family migrated to Ahmedabad, India where he joined the Post and Telegraph Department. In 1989, he retired from the service as the Postmaster General from Gondal. He worked as an All India Radio artist and was on the Sindhi Advisory Board of Central Sahitya Akademi for a decade. A book, Arjan Hasid: A Study, was published in 1996 based on his life and works. He was Chairman of the Gujarat Sahitya Akademi in 2002. In 2004, he participated in 1st Indo-Pak Writers' conference at New Delhi and visited Sindh, Pakistan as a member of Indo-Pak conference where he attended the "Shah-Sachal-Sami International Seminar" at Karachi and presented a scholarly paper on 18th-century Sindhi poet Sami.

He died on 26 December 2019 at 2:15 am in Ahmedabad, Gujarat, India.

== Literary works ==
Tanwani started writing poetry in 1956 and later wrote under the pen name Hasid. He was a member and secretary of Sindhi Sahit Sangat, Ahmedabad. Soon, his poems were published in leading magazines. In 1958, he participated in Akhil Bharat Sindhi Sahit Sammelan at Mumbai and All India 'Mushaira'. His first published work was Suwasan Jee Surhaan (Fragrance of Breath, 1966), a collection of poems and ghazals. His next work Pathar Pathar Ka'ndaa Ka'ndaa (Every Stone, Every Throne, 1974) was a collection of ghazals. In 1983, he wrote a musical opera, Umar Marueee, based on Shah Abdul Latif Bhittai's poetry and was composed by Chaman Tapodan. In 1985, his collection of ghazals Mero Siji (The Soiled Son, 1984) brought him the Sahitya Akademi Award. He edited a book based on life and works of poet Hari Daryani 'Dilgir', Hujan Hota Hayaat (1986). His next two publications were collections of ghazals, Mogo (The Dullard, 1994) and Unjna (The Thirst, 1999). Hasid also translated a Hindi book Jaishankar Prasad (1995) by Ramesh Chandra Shah. Hasid's next collection was published in 2006, Saahee Patje (Relax a While). In 2008, he compiled and edited an anthology Aazadia Khaanpoi Sindhi Ghazal (Anthology of Post Independence Sindhi Ghazals). His 2009 collection, Na le'n Na (No, Not So), is based on the subject of Post-Partition migration. He worked as a lyricist for 2012 Sindhi film Halyo Aa Putt Actor Thiyan. Many of his ghazals are set to tune by various composers.

== Writing style and reception ==
Hasid's debut work Suwasan Jee Surhaan was appreciated for being "an eclectic fusion of progressive ideas and traditional romance" and noted for invoking "the sentiment of Srinagar". The Pathar Pathar Ka'ndaa Ka'ndaa is considered to have contributed to Naee'n Kavita (New Wave movement in poetry). His Mero Siji introduced Synesthesia to Sindhi poetry and Hasid was lauded for freeing "Sindhi poetry from its pedantry and lexical shackles by employing a refreshing new idiom which greatly exploited the suggestivity and expressivity of the language". Mogo further improvised synesthesia by experimenting with the language and the senses. In Unjna, he extensively used personification to create "unique sensual world". For his latest publication Na le'n Na, Hasid expressed modern sensitivity and concerns using traditional poetry forms like Doha, Batis, and Waais.

His initial work was considered to be progressive poetry. Hasid started writing romantic poetry which had "a share of painful mixed metaphors". He changed his writing style with Mero Siji and avoided any romantic words which was considered as "a rebellion against oneself". Critic Param Abichandani noted that Hasid uses "poetry as an anodyne" which is "not a cure, but is certainly alleviating". He also mentioned that Hasid's new ghazals "talk about us and they talk about only this day, the painful, dark today, and not the yesterdays. His poems are pure psychic automation expressing our thoughts, our feelings".

To him, writing is "devout austerity a severe penance. It soothes, gratifies, whimpers, screeches, clenches lists and sews lips".

== Recognition ==
Hasid won the Sahitya Akademi Award in 1985 for Mero Siji, the Gujarat Sindhi Akademi Gaurav Puraskar in 1998, the Lifetime Achievement Award by National Council for Promotion of Sindhi Language in 2006, the Tagore Literature Award in 2011 for Na le'n Na, and the Lifetime Achievement Award by Akhil Bharat Sindhi Boli Sabha in 2012. In 2013, the Sahitya Akademi fellowship, the highest honour conferred by the Sahitya Akademi, was bestowed upon him.

== Personal life ==
Hasid married Parpati in 1947 at Kandiaro. She died in 2016. They had three sons, Luxman, Gangaram and Mohan; and a daughter, Parmeshwar.

== Bibliography ==
Hasid had published the following works:

- Suwasan Jee Surhaan (1966)
- Pathar Pathar Ka'ndaa Ka'ndaa (1974)
- Umar Marueee (1983) (Musical opera)
- Mero Siji (1984)
- Hujan Hota Hayaat (1986)
- Mogo (1994)
- Unjna (1999)
- Jaishankar Prasad (1995) (Translated a Hindi book by Ramesh Chandra Shah into Sindhi)
- Saahee Patje (2006)
- Aazadia Khaanpoi Sindhi Ghazal (2008) (Compiled and edited an anthology)
- Na le'n Na (2009)
