= Ghullam Hyder Mehjoor Solangi =

Sindhi historian

Ghullam Hyder Mehjoor (born 23 February 1941) is a Sindhi historian, sufi, poet, artist, teacher, musician, educator, politician, and journalist from Pakistan. He wrote three books including Daga achu monkhy Dah Han (Come Bull hit me), History of Rajput Solangi (Solanki) and Kashkol e Mehjoor.

== Early life ==
He was born in Murad Solangi village near Dalipota. He was cared for by his mother and came to Thatt Solangi, an ancient village in central Sindh. He passed Sindhi and Urdu final examinations. He further passed elementary drawing examinations and in sixth class English, he passed his teacher's interview and was appointed primary Head master at Attar Khan Marri village. He passed his English final in 1960 and matric private in 1962. From 1963 to 64 He passed F.A.C and B.A Sindhi from SV training course College Mithiani.

== Career ==
=== Teacher ===
He encouraged students' interests in gardening and Scouting. He taught students to recite the national anthem in rhythm as a better way to give respect to national flag. He supported students participating in debates, taking part in sports and oratory. He had strong interest on managing parks, making world maps in cement, decorating classrooms with drawings, and farming flowers. He retired after twenty years and three months of teaching.

=== Political life ===
As a student Mehjoor was active in national and parliamentary politics. In 1988 he was an independent candidate at PS-7 Nawabshah (now Shaheed Benezirabad). His election symbol was "Scissor". His election campaign was done on a bicycle with pamphlets, which was unusual at that time. He was not victorious, but his goal to protect tenant farmers lower-income people from exploitation by landlords had more success.

=== Artist ===
Mehjoor was a musician and artist.

=== Migration to Moro ===
In 1990 He faced a home robbery that forced him to leave his village and migrate to Moro. Most of his children are workers. His son Shamsheer Hyder sang songs on telecast Roshan Tara Programe as a student.

=== Sufi ===
He was a Sunni Muslim in his early life but converted to Shia. He is a Sufi preacher.

=== Author ===
In 2012 he faced a negative reaction to his book about Solangi clan history. He was called a racist by many Sindhi writers. His book was about the Solangi clan and Sindh Studies. He claimed that the Solangi clan is dominated by Afghan, Iranian and Arab invaders. He further claimed that modern Pakistan is loosely based upon the ancient Indus valley civilization that became Sindh. Research work challenging his book has not been published.
