= Kala Prakash =

Indian fiction writer and poet of Sindhi language

- Born: 2 January 1934; Karachi, Bombay Presidency, British India
- Died: 5 August 2018 (aged 84); Mumbai, Maharashtra, India
- Education: Jai Hind College
- Occupation: Writer
- Writing career
- Subjects: Fiction, poetry
- Notable awards: Sahitya Akademi Award (1994); Sindhi Language Authority Award (2011)

Kala Prakash (2 January 1934 – 5 August 2018) was an Indian novelist, short story writer, and poet of Sindhi language. She authored more than 15 books and won the prestigious Sahitya Akademi Award in 1994 from the Government of India.

== Biography ==
Kala was born on 2 January 1934 to a moderate family of Karachi, Sindh, British India (now Pakistan). She was only 13 when Pakistan was created and Sindhi Hindus had to leave their homeland. At that time, she was studying at Haridevi High School in Karachi. The deep pain of partition and bitter sense of homelessness can easily be felt in her writings. After migration to India, she studied at K.J. Khalnani High School. She got a master's degree from Jai Hind College Mumbai and entered into government service as an auditor. She continued this job till 1977. After getting a Diploma in Sindhi, she joined as a lecturer. During her teaching career, she always encouraged and inspired young girls to take up Sindhi literature.

Her first story Dohi Bedohi (ڏوهي بيڏوهي) was published in the literary magazine Naeen Dunya in 1953. Her first novel published in 1957 was Hik Dil Hazar Arman. In 1954, she was married to noted poet Moti Parkash. She moved to Dubai in 1980 to join her husband who was appointed there to manage Indian High School Dubai. After the retirement of her husband, they returned to India in 2002 and settled in Adipur.

Her short stories were published in various prominent literary magazines including Naeen Dunya, Sipoon, Rachna, and Hindwasi. She also wrote on the poetry of Shah Abdul Latif Bhittai and Sachal Sarmast. According to her, Shah Latif should be called the poet of people rather than that of mysticism.

== Publications ==
=== Novels ===
- Hik Dil Hazar Arman, 1954
- Sheeshay Ji Dil, 1960
- Hayati Hotan Reea, 1975
- Waqat, Vithiyoon, Vichhotiyoon, 1988
- Arsi-a-Aado, 1992
- Pakhan Ji Preet, 1998
- Samund ain Kinaro, 2004
- Oakha Pandh Piyar Ja, 2010

=== Short story collections ===
- Murk ain Mumta, 1973
- Varan men Gul, 1993
- Intizaar, 2008

=== Poetry collection ===
- Mumta Joon Lahroon, 1963

=== Autobiography ===
- Je Hianre Manjh Huran, 1987

== Awards and honours ==
Sources:

- Akhil Bharat, Sindhi Boli, and Sahit Sabha Award, 1965
- Maharashtra Sindhi Sahitya Academy Award, 1992
- Sahitya Akademi Award, 1994
- Ishwari Jeevatram Buxani Award, 2001
- Priya Darshni Academy Award, 2010
- Sindhi Language Authority Award, 2011

== Death ==
She died on 5 August 2018 in Mumbai.
