= Niranjan Khilnani =

Indian historian, scholar, professional writer and commentator

Niranjan M. Khilnani (27 November 1922 - 14 December 2012) was a historian, scholar, professional writer and commentator on Indian and International Affairs.

== Early life ==
Khilnani was born at Sukkur, Sindh to Manohardas Kauromal Khilnani and Amrit Devi, daughter of Kundan das Keswani. He was the grandson of Rai Bahadur Dewan Kauromal Chandanmal Khilnani of Bhiriya in Sindh. His brother Ashok Khilnani lives in Los Angeles, California married to Renu Khilnani with sons Madhu- Mark Khilnani, Keerti - Keith Khilnani. He was the youngest to secure a PhD from Bombay University at age 25 in 1947. He did his post doctoral research at Yale University.

== Personal life ==
He married Chitra (Shanta d/o Hassanand Tolani) who stayed in New Delhi. He has two sons Ravi and Vijay Khilnani, both are whizkids in electronics . Vijay was an important member of a team at Uniscans and Sonics Ltd which designed and built India's first CT Scanner in 1984 .

== Career ==
After partition he became the youngest lecturer at Hindu College, Delhi University. In 1951 he joined the Ministry of External Affairs where he rose to the level of Director, Historical Division.

He served with the Ministry of External Affairs from 1951 to 1980. He was the External Affairs Ministry’s expert on Latin America, Sikkim, Bhutan and Nepal.

In 1968, he visited Peru, Chile and Ecuador on a Human Rights Fellowship of the United Nations. In 1972 he represented India at the Second United Nations Geographical Conference in London. Khilnani was associated with CHOGM Conference and the 7th Non-aligned Summit in 1983 in New Delhi. After his retirement from the Ministry of External Affairs, Khilnani served on the Sarkaria Commission for Center - State relations.

In 1990 Khilnani visited Moscow as a visiting Professor

He wrote extensively for the national and international press.

== Recognition ==
- In 1952 Khilnani was awarded a Fulbright fellowship.
- While at Yale he won a prize for writing the best term-paper on the New Deal Policies of Franklin Delano Roosevelt.
- Khilnani attended the coronation ceremony of Her Majesty Queen Elizabeth II in 1953.

== Publications and Books ==
Khilnani published several books. His Panorama of Indian Diplomacy, Realities of Indian Foreign Policy, Road to Independence (1857 to 1947), Four Diamonds of Anand Bhavan, Indira Gandhi-the Iron Lady of Indian Politics, won acclaim.

- The Punjab under the Lawrences
- British power in the Punjab, 1839-1858
- Glimpses of Hindu America : Story of India’s Relations with Latin America
- Four diamonds of Anand Bhavan: Motilal Nehru, Jawaharlal Nehru, Indira Gandhi and Rajiv Gandhi a perceptive analysis of Indian political experience from 1929 to 1987
- Emergence of New Russia: Panoramic Survey of Russian History
- Panorama of modern Indus Valley
- New dimensions of Indian foreign policy : Prime minister Narasimha Rao’s Era X-rayed (hardcover)
- Socio-political dimensions of modern India
- The denuclearization of South Asia
- India’s political and economic policies towards her neighbours
- India 1990 : 1991 to 2001 AD
- Panorama of Indian diplomacy: From Mauryan epoch to post-Nehru era
- Iron Lady of Indian Politics: Indira Gandhi in the Balanced Perspective
- India's Road to Independence 1857 to 1947 (Panorama of India's Struggle for Freedom)
- Realities of Indian foreign policy
