= Kauromal Chandanmal Khilnani =

British Indian educationist, scholar

Deewan Kauromal Chandanmal Khilnani
- ديوان ڪوڙومل چندن مل کلناڻي
- Born: Pretam; 5 October 1844; Bhirya, District Naushehroz Feroz, Sindh, British India (Now Pakistan)
- Died: 16 December 1916 (aged 72)
- Occupations: Scholar, educationist, civil servant
- Writing career
- Genre: Prose
- Notable work: More than 50 books

Deewan Kauromal Chandanmal Khilnani (Sindhi: ديوان ڪوڙومل چندن مل کلناڻي) 5 October 1844–16 December 1916) was an educator, scholar and writer. He was one of the first major prose writers during the British Raj in India. He served as the first principal of the Training College for Men Hyderabad, Sindh, British India (now Pakistan), City Magistrate, Deputy Collector, Municipal Commissioner and Health Officer. He authored more than 60 books in Sindhi language. He wrote extensively on the panchayat system, health, agriculture, and folklore.

== Childhood and education ==
Kauromal was born on 5 October 1844 in Bhirya, District Naushehro Feroz, Sindh, British India (Now Pakistan). At his birth he was named 'Pritam', but because none of the children had survived earlier, the women folk felt superstitious and instead of sugar candy (misri) and sugar lump (patashas) they distributed pepper (kara mirch)on his birth. And relatives also changed his name to 'Kauro', meaning bitter. He studied Sindhi and Persian in the private school of Akhund Qazi Muhammad Suleman at village Darya Khan Jalbani (near his hometown Bhirya). He studied there from 1849 to 1855. When first primary school was opened in his hometown in 1855, he got admission there. He was a very intelligent student and mastered Sindhi and Persian language at a very early age. The Education Inspector of Sindh appointed him as a 'Boy Translator' for which he was given a scholarship of Rs 25/-. He then studied at Karachi. He was one of the four Sindhi students who went to Bombay (now Mumbai) for matriculation examination of the University of Bombay (Now University of Mumbai).

== Career ==
He started his career as a clerk in the office of the Commissioner of Karachi. He then served as a junior school teacher at Hyderabad and Sukkur. Afterwards, he served as Head Master of these schools. He also served as a Sindhi translator.

After qualifying Revenue and Judicial examinations, he was appointed as City Magistrate of Shikarpur and then City Magistrate of Hyderabad. He also served as Deputy Collector of Rohri and Hala subdivisions for seven years. He then joined the education department and served as the founding principal of the Training College for Men Hyderabad. In the year 1866, he got school opened in Bhiriya Sindh from Govt side (which is known as Kauromal Chandanmal Academy after his death). He also served as Municipal Commissioner and Health officer of Hyderabad. He retired in 1899.

After retirement, he remained member of the Sindh Education Department's Text Books Committee for many years. He also served as the as an Examiner for vernacular languages for the convenience of the Englishmen.

== Books ==
Deewan Kauromal Chandanmal is known as the father of Sindhi prose. He has written many essays on various topics in a simple and effective style. His 44 essays written up to 1907 were compiled by his son Manohar Das Khilnani and published by Sahitya Akademi, Delhi in 1960. He had mastery on Sindhi, Arabic, Persian, English, Sanskrit, Hindi and Bengali languages. He translated many books from Bengali, Hindi, Sanskrit and English into Sindhi. He was among the first who introduced terminology of Geometry and Chemistry into Sindhi. He also produced original work like Mahatmaoon ja Darshan, Arya Naari Charitra, Bhishma Pitamaha and Bhaktan joon Sakhiyun. An incomplete alphabetical list of his books is presented below:,

S.No.	Name of the Book (Roman English)	Name of the Book in Sindhi	Year of Publication	Comments
	Arya Nari Charitra (Lives of Aryan Women)	آريہ ناري چتر	1905	Biographies of noted Indian women
	Aghaz Ilim-e-Hikmat	آغاز علم حڪمت		
	Andera Aakhani	انديرا آکاڻي		Translation
	Aqleedas (Euclid), Book I, II & III	اقليدس (ڪتاب پھريون، ٻيو ۽ ٽيون)	1868	Books on Geometry
	Ba Mundiyoon (Two Rings)	ٻه منڊيون	1915	Translation of the Bankim Chandera Chatterjee's Bengali novel
	Baraniyoon Aakhaniyoon (Children's stories)	ٻاراڻيون آکاڻيون	1891	Short stories for toddlers
	Barana Bhajan aeen Pararthna	ٻاراڻا ڀڄن ۽ پرارٿنا	1909 (Third Edition)	
	Barana Geet	ٻاراڻا گيت	1891	
	Bhagat Jevniyoon	ڀڳت جيونيون	1908	
	Bhagatan jon Sakhiyoon	ڀڳتن جون ساکيون	1908	
	Bhalmansi Aeen Painchaityoon Chho Phityoon Aahin	ڀلمانسي ۽ پئنچاتون ڇو ڦِٽيون آهن؟	1907	Articles
	Bhajan Malha	ڀڄن مالا		
	Chander Mukhi	چندر مکي	1918	Translation of Bankim Chandra Chatterjee's Bengali novel Krishnakanta's Will
	Chetan Dev jo Jeevan Chariter	چيتن ديوَ جو جيوَن چـريــتـر	1912	
	Coulombs Ji Tareekh	ڪولمبس جي تاريخ	1868	Translation
	Dadu Sant jo Jeevan Chariter	دادو سنت جو جيوَن چريتر	1914	
	Hari Darshan (The vision of God)	هري درشن	1930	Translation of some philosophical lectures of Devendranath Tagore
	Hind Jo Sair	ھند جو سير	1939	Travel
	Hindustan Ji Tareekha	هندستان جي تاريخ		
	Ilim-e-Keemia	علم ڪيميا	1892	Translation
	Jeevan Indri Shaster	جيوَن اِندري شاستر (حيوانات ۽ نباتات جي بناوت جو علم)	1900	
	Khaiti (Part I)	کيتي (ڀاڱو پھريون)	1897	
	Khaiti (Part II)	(ڀاڱو ٻيو) کيتي	1901	
	Kheera jo Kheer Pania jo Pani	کير جو کير، پاڻيءَ جو پاڻي	1915	Translation of Adarsh Noonha's Bengali Novel
	Lakhay Jo Kitab	ليکي جو ڪتاب		
	Mahatma Pavan Ahari Baba	مهاتما پون آهاري بابا	written in 1915, published in 1937	
	Mahamari, Tihin man kahri mat sari	مهامَري، تنهن مان ڪهڙي مت سَري	1897	
	Mahatmaun ja Darshana	مهاتمائن جا درشن	1907	
	Nari Nirog Jeevan	ناري نروڳ جيون	1943	
	Naw Sanihta	نؤ سنيهتا (نئون نياپو: 1905ع)	1905	
	Nidoro Haru	ندورو هار	1916	Translation from Bengali
	Padarath Sikhya	پدارٿ سکيا	1900	
	Pako Pahu (Firm Resolution)	پڪو پھ	1862	A book on the importance of female education
	Phool Mala	ڦول مالا	1902	
	Qiso Makh Aeen Koreearay Jo	قصو مک ۽ ڪوريئڙي جو		
	Purani Shaster	پراڻي شاستر	1891	Translation of A Treatise on Biology
	Radha Rani	راڌا راڻـي	1914	Translation of Bankam Chandra Chatterjee's Radha Rani novel from Bengali language.
	Raj Rashi Bheesham Patamah jo Jeevan Chariter	راج رشي ڀيشم پتامهه جو جيوَن چريتر (1914ع)	1914	
	Raja Ram Mohan Rai jo Jevan Chariter	راجا رام موهن راءِ جو جيوَن چريتر	1907	
	Ratnavali	رتناولي	1888	Translation of famous Sanskrit drama Ratnavali
	Ravti	ريوتي	1905	
	Rohni	روهني	written in 1915, published in 1937	Novel
	Saameea Ja Sulooka (Part I, II, III)	ساميءَ جا سلوڪ (ڀاڱو پھريون، ٻيو ۽ ٽيون)	1885 & 1892	Compilation of the poetry of Sufi poet Sami
	Sang jo Parsang	سنگ جو پرسنگ	1899	
	Sanitary Primer	سينيٽري پرائمر		
	Sant Jaidev jo Jeevan Chariter	سنت جئديو جو جيوَن چريتر	1906	
	Sant Namdev jo Jeevan Chariter	سنت نامديوَ جو جيوَن چريتر	1908	
	Satela jay tukan diyaran Babat	سيتلا جي ٽڪن ڏيارڻ بابت	1887	
	Sindhi Gujharatoon	سنڌي ڳجھارتون	1888	
	Sindhi Pahaka	سنڌي پھاڪا	1888	
	Sindhi Text Books for Class IV, V, VI and VII	سنڌي درسي ڪتاب (ڪلاس چوٿون، پنجون، ڇھون ۽ ستون)	1873–1876	Texts books for schools
	Tahaka tay Tahaka	ٽهڪ تي ٽهڪ (ٽوٽڪا ۽ لطيفا)	1906	A book of Humour
	Zahida Rabia Basery	زاھدہ رابعہ بصري		

== Honours and awards ==
In recognition of his competence and services to the society, he was honoured with the title Rai Bahadur and also gifted with 1160 acres of agricultural land by the British Government of India.

== Death ==
Deewan Kauromal Chandanmal Khilnani died on 16 December 1916 at the age of 73 years.
