= Dalipota railway station =

Railway station in Pakistan

Coordinates: 26.892804°N 68.040871°E

General information
- Owner: Ministry of Railways

Other information
- Station code: THC

History
- Former names: Great Indian Peninsula Railway
Location

Dalipota railway station (Urdu: دالیپوتا ریلوے اسٹیشن) is located in Pakistan.

== See also ==
- List of railway stations in Pakistan
- Pakistan Railways
