= Mitha Khan Zardari =

Pakistani musician (1918–2011)

- مٺا خان زرداري
- Born: 1918; Village Rano Khan Sanghar District, Sindh, British India
- Died: 12 May 2011 (aged 92–93); Karachi, Pakistan
- Occupation: Instrumental musician (Gharra player)
- Awards: Shah Abdul Latif Bhitai Award; Lal Shahbaz Qalander award Sachal Sarmast award Presidential award by the President of Pakistan (1988)

Mitha Khan Zardari (Urdu: مٹھا خان زرداری, Sindhi: مٺا خان زرداري) (1918–2011) was a Pakistani musician and Gharra player from Sindh Pakistan.

== Early life ==
Mitha Khan was born at Taluka Sinjhoro, Sanghar District of Sindh. He attended Madera high school in Naushahro Feroze city of Sindh and matriculated from Government Noor Muhammad High School Hyderabad, Sindh. He was appointed as clerk in police department in 1942 and retired from services as an office superintendent in1980.

== Career ==
Mitha Khan Zardari performed with Khamiso Khan and Ghous Bux Brohi.

== Awards ==
He received the Shah Abdul Latif Bhitai award, Sachal Sarmast award, Lal Shahbaz Qalander award and Presidential award from President of Pakistan Ghulam Ishaque Khan in 1988.

== Death ==
He died of heart failure on 12 May 2011 in age of 93 years and left behind six sons and two daughters.
