= Moosa Lane =

Moosa Lane (Urdu: موسی لین) is one of the neighbourhoods of Lyari Town in Karachi, Sindh, Pakistan.

There are several ethnic groups in Moosa Lane including Muhajirs, kutchis Sindhis, Punjabis, Kashmiris, Seraikis, Pakhtuns, Balochis, and Memons, etc.
