= Kirat Babani =

Pakistani writer, journalist and progressive activist

Kirat Choithram Babani
- ڪيرت چوئٿرام ٻاٻاڻي
- Born: Kirat Choithram Babani; 3 January 1922; Morio Lakho (Sindh), India
- Died: 7 May 2015 (aged 93); Mumbai, India
- Writing career
- Pen name: "ڪيرت"
- Genre: Aesthetic
- Literary movement: Progressive

Kirat Choithram Babani aka Kirat Babani, (Sindhi: ڪيرت چوئٿرام ٻاٻاڻي; 3 January 1922 – 7 May 2015) was a Sindhi writer, journalist, and language activist. He wrote several books and articles, edited numerous newspapers and magazines, and received awards from government and non-governmental organizations.

== Education ==
Babani got his matriculation certificate from the Wills School in Nawabshah (now a branch of the M. H. Khuwaja Branch School), Bachelor of Arts from D. G College and Bachelor of Laws from Shahani Law College in Karachi (now Sindh Muslim Law College).

== Life ==
Babani worked in literature, journalism, and education. He believed that literature had a purpose and should portray life as honestly as possible. Babani also advocated for the preservation of the Sindhi script and for the recognition of the Sindhi language, including its inclusion in the Constitution of India. He was a member of the Advisory Board of the Sindhi Language, Sahitya Akademi, Ministry of HRD, and the Government of India, and was briefly involved in the Labour and Students Union movement. Additionally, Babani had the longest tenure in the Akhil Bharat Sindhi Boli Ain Sahit Sabha, an organization associated with the Sindhi language. In 1942, Babani was imprisoned for 11 months. In 1981, Babani visited the Soviet Union on a trip sponsored by the World Peace Council. He also visited the United States at the invitation of the International Sindhi Conference. Babani died on 7 May 2015 in Mumbai, India.

== Publications ==
- Hooa (She) Short Stories, 1956.
- Sooree a saa kayo (Call of Gallows), collection of eight one act plays, 1972.
- Jeki Ditho Ho Moon (Whatever I had seen), travelogue, 1981.
- Abol Rani (Queen who would not speak), Sindhi folk tales, 1982
- Awheen Sab Nanga Ahiyo (All of you are nude), short stories, 1987
- Kujh Budhayum Kujh Likayum (Narrated some, hidden some), autobiography in 4 parts, 1993.
- Likhyo Liyaka Paeen (Peeing Secretly), poetry, 2000.

== Journalism ==
Editor Sindh Rises in English & Sindh Sujag in Sindhi, monthly political magazine since 1991. In addition, Kirat had also compiled & edited Choond Sindhi Mazmoon (Selected essays), Choond Sindhi Lok Kahanyoon (Selected Sindhi Folk Tales), 1991, which were published by Sahitya Akademi, Ministry of HRD, Government of India.

== Awards ==
- Award for Significant Literary Contributions, 1987 (At Mumbai by Maharashtra State Sindhi Sahitya Akademi)
- Award for Best Literary Work, 1992 (At Calcutta by Bhartiya Bhashal Parishad).
