= Abbas Korejo =

Fiction writer

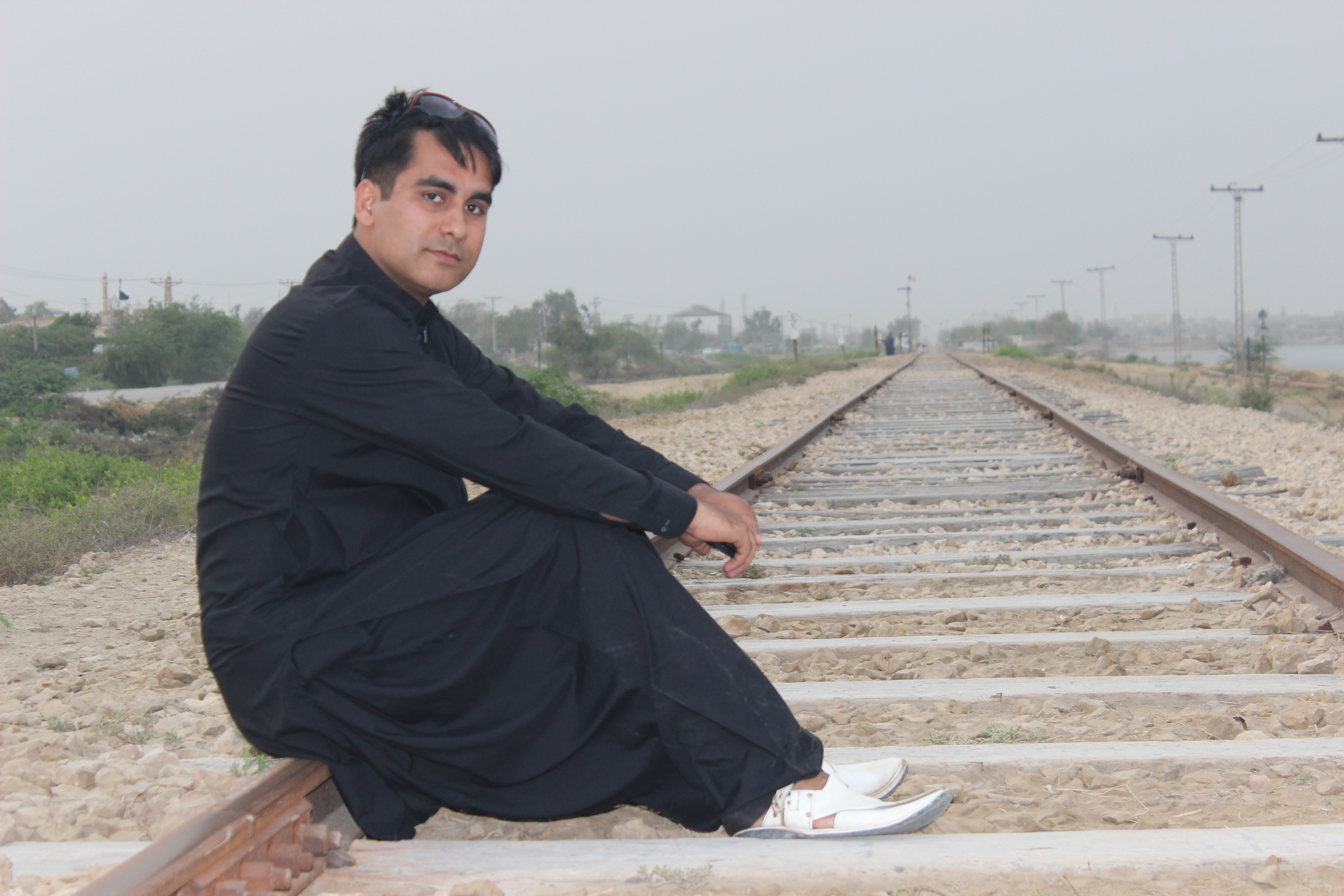
- Born: September 16, 1983 (age 42); Kamber, Sindh, Pakistani
- Occupation: Writer
- Writing career
- Genre: Fiction
- Subjects: Literature, socialism
- Website: www.abbaskorejo.com

Ghulam Abbas Korejo (Sindhi: عباس ڪوريجو) (born on September 16, 1983), known as Abbas Korejo, is a Sindhi fiction writer, a columnist, and researcher whose columns are published in various Sindhi and English language newspapers and magazines in Pakistan. He has authored five books, two of them award-winning.

== Books ==
He has written short stories in Sindhi and has also written one research-based book titled Jadeed Kahani Fun & Mozu جديد ڪھاڻي فَن ۽ موضوع. A few of Abbas Korejo's best known books are:

- Panhinji Dharti پنھنجي ڌرتي ("Our land")
- Chand Peran Heth (چنڊ پيرن ھيٺ)
- Jadeed Kahani: Fun-o-Mozoo ( جديد ڪھاڻي)
- Literature & Extremism ادب ۽ انتھاپسندي
- The Tree وڻ

== See also ==
- Sindhi literature
