= Nuzhat Pathan =

Pakistani politician

Member of the National Assembly of Pakistan
- In office 13 August 2018 – 10 August 2023
- Constituency: Reserved seat for women

Personal details
- Party: MQM-P (2026-present)
- Other political affiliations: PTI (2016-2026); PML(Q) 2006–2016); PPP (2002-2006)

Nuzhat Pathan (Sindhi: نزهت پٺاڻ; Birth: 12 February 1965) is a Pakistani politician who had been a member of the National Assembly of Pakistan from August 2018 till August 2023. Previously, she was a member of Provincial Assembly of Sindh from 2002 to 2013.

== Early life and education ==
She was born on 19 February 1965 in Hyderabad, Pakistan.

She received a degree of Master of Arts in Political Science and degree of Master of Arts in Economics.

== Political career ==
She was elected to the Provincial Assembly of Sindh as a candidate of PPP on a reserved seat for women in the 2002 General Elections.

In March 2006, she quit PPP and joined Pakistan Muslim League (Q) (PML-Q). In a 2006 Interview, she said she has been affiliated with PPP for the last 27 years.

In October 2006, she was inducted into the provincial Sindh cabinet of Chief Minister Arbab Ghulam Rahim and was appointed as adviser to the Chief Minister.

She was re-elected to the Provincial Assembly of Sindh as a candidate of PML-Q on a reserved seat for women in the 2008 General Elections.

In 2011, she left PML-Q and joined Pakistan Muslim League (Like-Minded).

In October 2016, she was appointed as Secretary-General of the women's wing of PTI's chapter in Sindh.

She was elected to the National Assembly of Pakistan as a candidate of PTI on a reserved seat for women from Sindh in the 2018 General Elections.
