= Syed Wadal Shah =

Pakistani chemist (1939–1975)

Syed Wadal Shah HI
- سيد وڏل شاھ
- Born: 7 January 1939; Village Amin Lakho, District Matyari, Sindh, Pakistan
- Died: 16/17 December 1975
- Education: University of Sindh; Imperial College London
- Known for: Natural product chemistry Organic chemistry
- Awards: Hilal-i-Imtiaz (Crescent of Excellence) Award in 2012
- Scientific career
- Fields: Organic Chemistry
- Workplaces: Sindh University, Sindh University Engineering College (Now Mehran University of Engineering and Technology, Jamshoro)

Syed Wadal Shah (Sindhi: سيد وڏل شاھ; 7 January 1939 - 16 December 1975) was a Pakistani scientist specialising in organic chemistry and a professor at Sindh University Engineering College, Jamshoro, Sindh.

== Biography ==
Syed Wadal Shah was born in the village Amin Lakho, near Saeedabad, District Matyari, Sindh, Pakistan on 7 January 1939. His father Syed Dittal Shah died when he was five years old.

Shah received early education in the primary school of his native village. His passed matriculation examination from Makhdoom Ghulam Hyder High School, Hala New and Intermediate from Government Degree College (Now Government College University) Hyderabad. He earned BSc and MSc degrees in 1961 and 1963 respectively from University of Sindh in organic chemistry.

He was appointed as a lecturer in the Department of Chemistry at the University of Sindh, Jamshoro, Pakistan. He obtained a doctoral scholarship and received PhD degree from Imperial College London in 1967 in Organic Chemistry. On his return, he was posted as a lecturer in Engineering College of Sindh University (Now Mehran University of Engineering and Technology). He also received his post doctorate from Tokyo Institute of Technology, Japan in 1969 and the Royal Norwegian Council for Scientific and Industrial Research.

Shah joined his parent department as a professor of organic chemistry. He established the first laboratory of organic chemistry in the University of Sindh, authored/co-authored six books, published research papers and converted his department into a research institute. He prepared research proposals and succeeded to seek funding from Pakistan Science Foundation and National Science Foundation of USA. He also organized three International Conferences in Nawabshah and Jamshoro through Sindh Science Society. He served as an editor of Monthly Science Magazine.

Dr Shah was the first faculty member of the University of Sindh, whose five students completed their PhD research. In the last years of his life, 11 PhD students were enrolled under his supervision. This was the time when research in the University was in infancy. Sufficient laboratories and other related resources for PhD level research were not available. He requested Royal Norwegian Council for Scientific and Industrial Research to allow him to analyze the chemical samples prepared by his PhD students in Norway. His request was accepted. He spent four months in Norway and successfully completed the analysis of the samples and was planning to return to Pakistan on 20 December 1975. Unluckily, he was found dead on the floor of his room in the night of 16–17 December 1975. The cause of his death as conveyed by Norwegian authorities was "Unknown".

In recognition of his services for promotion of research and science education, the Government of Pakistan awarded Hilal-e-Imtiaz, the second highest award of the country, after 38 years of his death in 2011. His wife Feroza Syed received this award from the President of Pakistan. His students and fellows established Dr Syed Wadal Shah Society and the University of Sindh assigned his name to a road in the university.

== Books ==
Sources:

- علم ڪيميا - پاليٽيڪنڪ ادارن لاءِ ( Chemistry - For Polytechnic Institutes)
- ابتدائي سائنس (Elementary Science)
- ڪيميا (Chemistry)
- پرائمري استادن لاءِ جنرل سائنس (General Science for Primary Teachers)
- علم ڪيميا جي لغت (Dictionary of Chemistry)
- خلائي سفر (Space Travel)
- غلطين جي نفسيات (Psychology of Errors) as a co-author
