= Mai Allah Wassai =

Pakistani folk and light classical singer

- مائي الهه وسائي
- Born: 1928; Sujawal, Sindh, Pakistan
- Died: 29 April 2003 (aged 75); Sujawal, Pakistan
- Occupation: Singer
- Awards: Shah Abdul Latif Bhitai Award; 2003; Tamgha-e-Imtiaz (Medal of Distinction) award 2007 by the Government of Pakistan

Mai Allah Wassai (Sindhi: مائي الهه وسائي) (1923 - 29 April 2003) was a renowned Sindhi singer celebrated for her contributions to folk and light classical music in Sindh, Pakistan.

== Life and career ==
Allah Wassai was born around 1928 in Sujawal city of Sujawal District of Sindh, Pakistan.

Mai Allah Wassai sang popular folk and light classical songs which were broadcast from Pakistan Broadcasting Corporation, Hyderabad and televised from Pakistan Television Corporation center Karachi. Her audio cassette was issued by Institute of Sindhology, University of Sindh Jamshoro in 1999.

== Awards and recognition ==
- She was posthumously awarded the Tamagh-e-Imtiaz (Medal of Distinction), the fourth highest national award by the Government of Pakistan on 23 March 2007.
- She performed at Shah Abdul Latif Bhittai Conference on the occasion of the Urs of Shah Abdul Latif Bhittai at Bhit Shah, Hyderabad and she was awarded with Shah Latif award by Culture Department, Government of Sindh.

== Death ==
Mai Allah Wasai died of throat cancer on 29 April 2003 at age 75.
