= Molana Azizullah Bohio =

Pakistani religious scholar and politician (1946–2021)

Azizullah Bohio
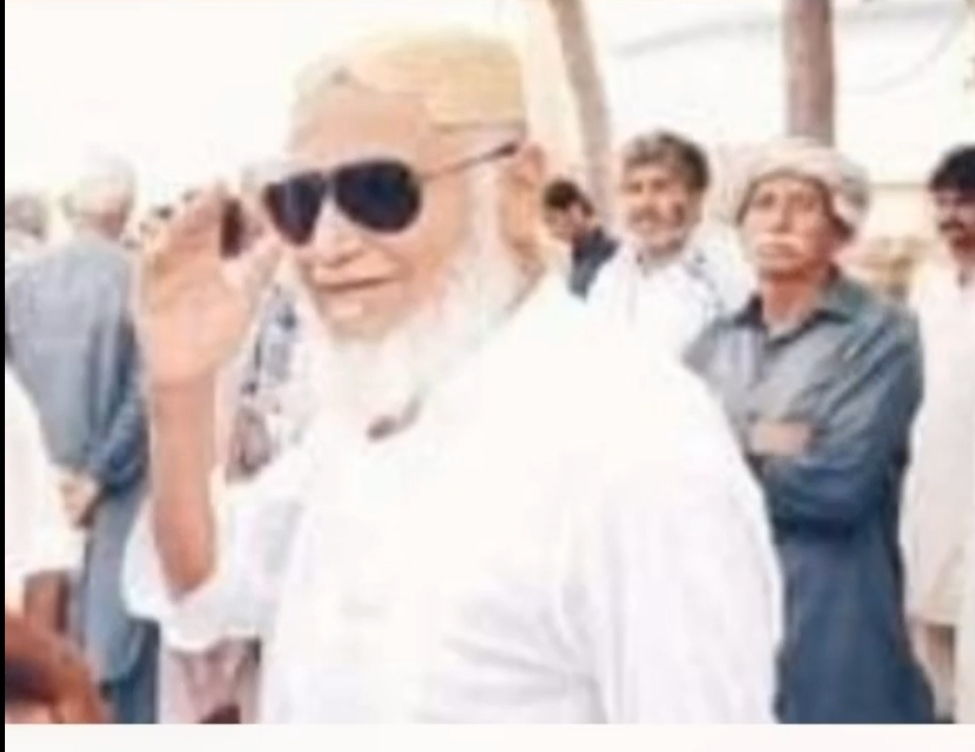
- Born: 14 March 1946; Khair Muhammad Bohio, Naushahro Feroze District, Sindh, Pakistan
- Died: 2 November 2021 (aged 75); Naushahro Feroze District, Sindh, Pakistan
- Political party: Sindh Sagar Party

Maulana Azizullah Bohio (14 March 1946 – 2 November 2021) was a Pakistani Islamic theologian, writer, and politician from Naushahro Feroze District, Sindh. He founded and served as chairman of the Sindh Sagar Party, a Sindhi nationalist political organisation, and served as Secretary General of the Sindh chapter of the Pakistan Oppressed Nations Movement (PONM). He was the author of more than fifty books in Sindhi and Urdu on religion, politics, and Islamic history, all published by Sindh Sagar Academy. He died of heart disease on 2 November 2021.

== Early life and education ==
Bohio was born on 14 March 1946 in the village of Khair Muhammad Bohio, Naushahro Feroze District, Sindh. He received his early education at his village school and subsequently attended several religious seminaries.

== Career ==
=== Political career ===
Bohio was a member of Jamiat Ulema-e-Islam (JUI) under Mufti Mahmud in the late 1980s. He left JUI following disagreements over Mufti Mahmud's position on the Pakistan Army's operations in Bangladesh and over issues relating to the rights of Sindh, including the status of the Sindhi language, water resources, and migration from other provinces into Sindh. He subsequently founded the Sindh Sagar Party together with other religious scholars and served as its chairman until his death.

Bohio also served as Secretary General of the Pakistan Oppressed Nations Movement (PONM) Sindh Chapter. In 2007, his son Rashid Bohio was kidnapped; Bohio publicly alleged that the investigating police officer released the kidnappers against payment of a bribe and demanded the officer's transfer.

He led demonstrations against water shortages in Sindh and opposed the construction of further dams on the Indus River. He advocated for the rights of minority communities, farmers, and labour. He publicly opposed forced conversions of Hindu women in Sindh.

=== Religious and intellectual views ===
Bohio was a critic of religious extremism. He held unorthodox theological positions, arguing that the Arabic term salah (commonly translated as ritual prayer) referred in the Quran to collective social and political organisation rather than to the individual prayer practice known in Urdu as namaz. These positions were set out in his published works and generated controversy within religious circles.

Before his death, Bohio requested that he be buried in a non-Muslim graveyard, stating that he wished to reduce the division between Muslims and non-Muslims in Sindh. The request became a subject of public debate following his death.

== Books and publications ==
Bohio authored more than fifty books in Sindhi and Urdu, all published by Sindh Sagar Academy, covering religion, politics, and Islamic history.

=== Sindhi titles ===
Title	Notes
Quran Mahjoor	Digitised copy held at Internet Archive
Quran Khan Siwai Kinh ji Bh Tabedari na Kayo	Digitised copy held at Internet Archive
Ayat-e-Bayanat	
Quran jo Farman	
Fitrat ji Boli	
Salwat aeen Nimaz main Firq	
Fitna Inkar Quran kian aeen Kadhin	
Allah ji Ibadat Kian aeen Kadhin Kajy	
Ahsan-ul-Hadees	
Islami Tareekh Quran ji Roshni main	
Quran Panjho Tafseer Pan Kary tho	
Fiqh Quran	
Salf Salhin ji Nalin Saan Ilm main Khayanatoon	

=== Urdu titles ===
Title	Notes
Fitna-e-Inkar-e-Quran (Part 1)	Digitised copy held at Internet Archive
Secularism aur Do Qoumi Nazriya	Digitised copy held at Internet Archive
Arabi Madaris ka Nisab-e-Taleem Khilaf Quran hai	Digitised copy held at Internet Archive
Din Mulla fi Sabil Allah Fasad	Digitised copy held at Internet Archive
Roza-e-Rasool	Digitised copy held at Internet Archive
Aayat Karima Layla-tul-Qadr: Umar-e-Rasool	Digitised copy held at Internet Archive
Ahsan ul Hadith (3 volumes)	Confirmed by Scribd and Sindh Express
Salaat Aur Namaz Main Farq	Digitised copy held at Scribd
Mujzaat	
Vijood bary Talaa	
Vildiyat wo Vifate Eissa	
Kia Humary Nimazin Quran Silwaat hain	
Misjid Quran Ki nazr main	
Mard aur aurat ki barbri	
Qurani Salwat	
Quran par hamla	
Tareekh Islam ka Quran aeeny main	
Fiqh-ul-Quran	
Islah Ka amal pahly apny ap se Shru Kia jai	

== Death ==
Bohio died of heart disease on 2 November 2021, at the age of seventy-five, in Naushahro Feroze District. His death was noted by Sindhi writers, civil society organisations, and political and religious figures.
