= Allah Dino Noonari =

Pakistani classical singer

Allah Dino Noonari Sindhi: الھڏنو نوناري
- Born: 1885; Sukkur Sindh
- Died: 1951(aged 66); Sukkur, Pakistan
- Occupation: Singer
- Years active: 1885–1951

Ustad Allah Dino Noonari (Sindhi: الهڏنو نوناري, Urdu: الھڈنو نوناری) (b. 1885, d.21 July 1951) was a popular Pakistani classical singer, belonged to Sindh Pakistan. He was famous as a singer of Kafi, a form of poetry of Sindhi and Siraiki languages.

== Early life ==
Noonari was born in 1885 near Sukkur, Sindh, Pakistan. At the age of 10 years his father lef him behind. He became an orphan in childhood. Thus he could not receive his early education. He left his native place to Hyderabad, Sindh .

== Career ==
Earlier he got training in Hyderabad from Ustad Amir Khan and later from Ustad Murad Ali Khan. He was contemporary to ustad Ashiq Ali Khan of Pattiala. He was not related to any traditional school of music or musical families or gharanas. He was God gifted natural vocalist and singer but proved himself as an expert classical singer. He was aware of almost all type of musical skills as atta'ees.He was first ever singer who showed skills and got the title of ustad. Noonari became immortal voice and vocalist of every century. He was the best Singer of Kafi of the 20th century. Noonari was also composer of Bait, a form of classical Sindhi poetry.

== Death ==
According to daily Kawish, a newspaper of Sindhi Language and Encyclopædia Sindhiana by Sindhi Language Authority, he died on 21 July 1951 in Sukkur.
