= Shagufta Jumani =

Pakistani politician

Member of the National Assembly of Pakistan
- Incumbent
- Assumed office 29 February 2024
- Constituency: Reserved seat for women
- In office 13 August 2018 – 10 August 2023
- Constituency: Reserved seat for women
- In office 1 June 2013 – 31 May 2018
- Constituency: Reserved seat for women
- In office 17 March 2008 – 16 March 2013
- Constituency: Reserved seat for women
- In office 16 November 2002 – 15 November 2007
- Constituency: Reserved seat for women

Personal details
- Party: PMLN (2002-present)

Shagufta Jumani (Urdu: شگفتہ جمانی, Sindhi: شگفته جماڻي) is a Pakistani politician who has been a member of the National Assembly of Pakistan from August 2018 till August 2023. Previously she was member of the National Assembly from 2002 to May 2018.

== Political career ==
She was elected to the National Assembly of Pakistan as a candidate of Pakistan Muslim League (N) (PMLN) on a seat reserved for women from Sindh in the 2002 Pakistani general election.

She was re-elected to the National Assembly as a candidate of PMLN on a seat reserved for women from Sindh in the 2008 Pakistani general election.

She was re-elected to the National Assembly as a candidate of PMLN on a reserved seat for women from Sindh in the 2013 Pakistani general election.

She was re-elected to the National Assembly as a candidate of PMLN on a seat reserved for women from Sindh in the 2018 Pakistani general election.
