= Kamla Keswani =

Indian female singer

- Born: 27 August 1934; Karachi, Sindh, British India
- Died: 9 May 2009 (aged 74); Jaipur, India
- Occupations: Playback singer, folk singer
- Years active: 1950–2000

Kamla Keswani (27 August 1934 - 9 May 2009) was an Indian folk and playback singer. She was one of the popular Sindhi language singers of India.

== Early life ==
Kamla was born on 27 August 1934 in Karachi, Sindh, British India (now Pakistan). Her parents belonged to Sukkur. Her father Gobind Ram Madnani was a telephone operator. She attended school in Sukkur and was only 13 years old when the partition of India happened. Like other Hindu Sindhis, she migrated to India in 1947 and settled first in Jodhpur, then in Bikaner and finally in Jaipur. She continued her education in Jaipur and received a Bachelor of Arts degree from the University of Rajasthan. She was interested in music and singing since her school days.

== Singing career ==
She began her singing career from All India Radio. She sang many marriage songs called sahera or lada, Sufi kalams and folk songs both in Sindhi and Rajasthani languages. Some of her popular songs were recorded by His Master's Voice and All India Radio. She also sang in marriage parties, social gatherings and musical programs all over India and abroad. She also used to perform on Indian TV channels. A number of albums of her songs were also released.

Famous musician C. Arjun introduced her to Sindhi cinema as a playback singer. She performed as a playback singer in the following Sindhi-language Indian films:

- Ho Jamalo
- Shall Dheear Na Jaman
- Ladli

== Death ==
Kamla Keswani died on 9 May 2009 in Jaipur, India.
