= Mumtaz Rashidi =

Pakistani social worker (1934–2004)

Begum Mumtaz Rashidi (Sindhi: بيگم ممتاز راشدي) (March 1934 – 1 November 2004) was a Pakistani social worker and writer. She served as Pakistan's first woman press attaché in 1954. She also worked in the Philippines, China and Hong Kong on various ambassadorial assignments. She was the wife of Pir Ali Muhammad Rashidi, a renowned scholar and politician of Sindh, Pakistan.

== Childhood and education ==
Mumtaz Rashidi was born on 8 March 1934 in Calcutta, British India. She was the grandniece of Sher- i-Bengal A.K. Fazalul Haq. She got early education at Dao Hill School of Darjeeling. She received Degree of Art from Eden Girls College Dhakka and B.A. in English literature from Dhakka University with first class first position. She also took Master of Arts degree from the same university again with first class first position. She got Diploma in Journalism from Notre Dame Indiana University USA in 1955–56. She was well versed in English, French, Bengali, Urdu and Sindhi languages.

== Career ==
She became Pakistan's first woman press attaché in 1954 and got posted in Paris. It was there that she met then Pakistan's federal information minister Pir Ali Mohammad Rashidi whom she married in 1955. She also served on various ambassadorial assignments in the Philippines, China and Hong Kong. She returned to Pakistan with her husband in 1965. Ms Rashidi became involved in many social welfare projects for the people of Sindh, especially those living in Upper Sindh and near Manchar Lake. She also worked in close collaboration with international welfare organizations. She founded a social welfare organization for the development of children and women. She served as a member of National Commission on the Status of Women under Cabinet Division of Government of Pakistan from 1983 to 1986. She also served as adviser and coordinator of National Pakistan Women Association. She represented Pakistan at a number of International forums, seminars and conferences.

She served as member of board of governors of Quaid-e-Azam Academy, Pakistan National Council of Arts and Pakistani Commission for cooperation with UNESCO. She was also member of Senate and Syndicate of Sindh Agriculture University Tandojam. She took an active part in Sindh Through Centuries Conference which was held in Karachi in 1975.

== As a writer ==
Ms Rashidi wrote regularly for various newspapers, including Dawn, Morning News and The Sun. She wrote books on social issues of Sindh. Some of her books are listed below:

- Sindh aur Nigah-i-Qadarshanas
- Islamic Art and Culture of Sindh

== Death ==
She died on 1 November 2004 and was buried in Meva Shah graveyard of Karachi. She left behind two children: son Adil Rashidi and daughter Anadil Rashidi.
