= Abdul Karim Solangi =

Pakistani artist

Abdul Karim Solangi (born 1943) is a Pakistani artist known for his work in kinetic sculpture in Pakistan. His sculptures, made from recycled fabric, wastepaper, and plaster, depict village life in Sindh.

== Career ==
Solangi's interest in art began in his youth, influenced by his family's connection to Sindhi culture and heritage. In 1985, he created a kinetic sculpture depicting a blacksmith and an apprentice.

While working in the Sindh education sector, Solangi travelled throughout the province, learning about the culture. This led him to produce artworks, some of which include representations of figures such as Sufi singer Allan Fakir, folk vocalist Jalal Chandio, and musician Misri Khan Jamali.

As of 2021, Solangi worked out of his one-room City Museum in Lyari's Moosa Lane, which functioned as both his residence and workspace. The museum, open to the public, contains over 20 of his artworks.

== Recognition ==
Solangi received the Presidential Pride of Performance Award in 2015. His work has been exhibited at the Karachi Expo Centre and the Pakistan Arts Council.
