= Bherya =

- Village
- Location in Karnataka, India Bherya (India)
- Coordinates: 12.589075°N 76.349827°E
- Country: India
- State: Karnataka
- District: Mysuru
- Taluk: Saligrama

Government
  - Body: Grama Panchayath

Area
  - Total: 4 km^{2} (1.5 sq mi)
- Elevation: 820 m (2,690 ft)

Population (2011)
  - Total: 4,915
  - Density: 1,200/km^{2} (3,200/sq mi)

Languages
  - Official: Kannada
- Time zone: UTC+5:30 (IST)
- PIN: 571 608
- Telephone code: 08223
- Vehicle registration: KA-45, KA-09 & KA-55

Bherya is a village coming under Hosa Agrahara hobli jurisdiction, located in Saligrama taluk of Mysuru district in the Indian state of Karnataka.

Bherya is located 10 km northeast of the town of Saligrama, 18 km north of Krishnarajanagara, 21 km southwest of the town of Krishnarajapete and 60 km northwest of the city of Mysuru. It is located at the junction of NH-373/SH-57 and SH-85, north of River Kaveri and west of River Hemavati.

== Demographics ==
There are 4,915 people in Bherya living in 1092 houses.

== PIN code ==
There is a post office in Bherya and the postal code is 571608.

== See also ==
- Saligrama, Mysore
- Krishnarajanagara
- Kikkeri
