= Jan Muhammad Junejo =

Leader of the Khilafat Movement

Barrister Jan Muhammad Junejo (Sindhi: جان محمد جوڻيجو; Urdu: جان محمد جونيجو; title: Raees-Ul-Muhajireen; رۂيس المھاجرين; 1886–1921) was a leader of the Khilafat Movement and took active part in their struggle against the British Raj.

Barrister Junejo was a landlord and a politician from Larkana who took part in the Khilafat Movement at a young age. A large number of migrants, estimated to be around 25 thousand in number, left for Peshawar under Barrister Junejo as part of the Khilafat Movement. Attempts aimed at stopping them did not succeed. The rail fare of the entire caravan amounting to thousands of rupees was paid by Barrister Junejo from his own pocket. Wherever the train stopped, the local people turned out to welcome the thousands of muhajireens who were garlanded and showered with gifts and money. Speeches were recited in their honour at the Wazirabad Junction and some people began to cry in response to such overtures. Barrister Junejo stopped them from doing so saying that it was not an occasion for crying but time for action. He told them that they are going to Kabul not to eat grapes or pomegranates of Kandahar but to save Islam.
