= Salahuddin Panhwar =

Pakistani jurist

Justice of the Sindh High Court
- In office 27 June 2012 – 13 February 2025

Personal details
- Born: 9 August 1966 (age 60)

Salahuddin Panhwar (born 9 August 1966) is a Pakistani jurist who has been a justice of the Supreme Court of Pakistan since 14 February 2025. He previously served as a judge of the Sindh High Court from 2012 to 2025.

== Career ==
Panhwar began his legal career as a lawyer. He enrolled as an advocate for the Lower Court on October 20, 1994, followed by the High Court on February 25, 1997, and the Supreme Court of Pakistan on July 17, 2010.

Panhwar also served as the general secretary of the District Bar Association in Mirpurkhas from 2002 to 2003 and again from 2005 to 2006. He was elected as the president of the same association for multiple terms from 2006 to 2012. He also served as a member of the Pakistan Bar Council from 2010 to 2012, where he chaired the Human Rights Committee and the Appeal Committee for Sindh.

Panhwar was also a member of the Board of Governors for the Law Colleges at the University of Sindh and the Public School in Mirpurkhas from 2009 to 2012.
