= Abul Hassan Sagheer Sindhi =

Sindhi Muslim scholar

Abul Hassan Dahri
- Born: Ṭhaṭṭo, Sindh (present-day Pakistan)
- Died: 1724; Medina
- Other name: Abul Hassan Dahri
- Occupations: Linguist and translator
- Known for: Developed the old 40-letter Sindhi writing system

Abul Hassan Dahri (Arabic: أبو الحسن بن محمد صادق ڏاھري، المدني), also known as Makhdoom Abul Hassan Dahri (d.1176 AH/1724 AD), was a Muslim scholar who is known as the founder of the old 40-letter Sindhi writing system.

== Additional information ==
- Syed Salman Nadwi, Arab o Hind Ke Taluqqat, Karachi, Kareem Sons Publishers, 1972, pp 241–242.
- Edward C Sachau, Alberuni’s India: An Account of the Religion, Philosophy, Literature, Geography, Chronology, Astronomy, Customs, Laws and Astrology of India, Vol. 1, 1888. Reprinted Lahore, Sheikh Mubarak Ali, 1962. Ibid., p 232.
- N B Baloch, Sindhi Suratkhati e Khattati, Hyderabad, Sindhi Language Authority, 1991, p vi. Sachau, op.cit., p 231.
- B H Ellis, 1856, Report on Education in Sind, Nabi Baksh Baloch (ed.), Education in Sind before the
- British Conquest and the Educational Policies of the Government, Hyderabad, University of Sindh, 1971, pp 1–44.
- N B Baloch (ed. & comp), Sindhi Boli Jo Aganhro Mangzum Zakhuro, Hyderabad, Sindhi Language Authority, 1993.
- Richard F Burton, 1851, Muslim Education in Sind in Baloch (ed.), op.cit., 1971, p 48.
