= Dadi Leela =

Pakistani educationist, music teacher (1916-2007)

- Born: Leelavati Harchandani; 20 December 1916; Bombay Presidency, British India
- Died: 14 September 2017 (aged 100); Hyderabad, Sindh, Pakistan
- Occupations: Educationist; Music teacher; Philanthropist; Scholar; Writer
- Years active: 1940–2017
- Known for: advocacy of women's education
- Spouse: Tulsi Das Harchandani
- Awards: Tamgha-e-Imtiaz (2016)

Dadi Leela (born Leelavati Harchandani; 20 December 1916 – 14 September 2017; sometimes spelled Dadi Leelan) was a Pakistani educationist, music teacher, philanthropist, and a former member of Sindh provincial assembly known for her advocacy of women's education. She also contributed to Sindhi culture and literature.

A recipient of the Tamgha-e-Imtiaz (lit. 'Medal of Distinction') for her contribution to the field of education, she worked as additional director of schools in Hyderabad and deputy and provincial commissioner for the Girl Guides till 1975. In 1985, she was appointed or selected as a Member of Provincial Assembly (MPA). She was the oldest surviving amil of Sindh.

== Early life and education ==
She was born to Dewan Hotchand Wadhwani on 20 December 1916 in Bombay Presidency, British India (in modern-day Sindh). After her mother died, her two younger brothers migrated to India, and she was left alone in Pakistan where she spent her life. In 1954, she married Tulsi Das Harchandani, a civil surgeon, with whom she has a son.

She received her early education from a school in Hyderabad. She did her matriculation from Noor Muhammad High School Hyderabad and graduated in 1940 from DJ Government College (in modern-day Government Kali Mori College) in 1940. She was the oldest surviving student of the college.

== Career ==
She started her professional music career in 1940 after being appointed a music teacher at Teachers Training College in Hyderabad. Prior to her retirement in 1975, she continued participating in music and theatre besides education and Sindhi women rights. In 1936, she participated in all India music competition, hosted by DJ Government College Hyderabad. She sang a bhajan, leading her to win the contest with first position. As a vocalist, she also worked at Radio Pakistan.

She also served as the member of Minority Affairs for the Ministry of Religious and Minority Affairs and chairperson of Ladies Club, Hyderabad. She was also appointed inspector of girls school, the principal of Mira Girls High School Hirabad, Hyderabad and member of the Rotary Club. She also served as vice president of Senior Citizens Association.

== Death ==
She was suffering from chronic condition and died on 14 September 2017 in Hyderabad, Pakistan. She was cremated at Cremation Ground in Badin.
