= Zulfiqar Ali Shah Jamote =

Pakistani politician

Syed Zulfiqar Ali Shah Jamote (15 April 1941, in Matiari - 11 March 2011, in Karachi) was a two-time Senator and Federal Minister from Sindh, Pakistan. At the time of his death he was the leader of the Pakistan Muslim League (F).

== Family ==
Jamote hailed from Matiari. He was married and had three children.

== Career ==
=== Senator ===
Jamote served as senator from 1985 to 1994 and then from 1991 to 1997. While there he served as the chairman of a number of standing committees including defence, foreign affairs, and labour.

=== Minister ===
He served as Federal Minister for Population Welfare during the interim government in 1993.

=== PML-F ===
Jamote served as President of PML-F.

== Other activities ==
Jamote served as President of the Safari and Outdoor Club of Pakistan.

== Death ==
Jamote died at a private hospital in Karachi. He was buried in Matiari where his funeral was attended by a large number of people. Shops in Matiari, Oderolal station, Tajpur, Allah Dino Saand and Shahpur Chakar remained closed out of respect.
