= Motilal Jotwani =

Indian writer, educationist

- Born: 13 January 1936; Rohri, Sukkur district, Sindh, British India
- Died: 28 January 2008 (aged 72); Pune, India
- Occupations: Scholar, writer, educationist
- Known for: Sindhi literature
- Spouse: Raj Jotwani
- Children: 2 sons
- Awards: Padma Shri; Shah Abdul Latif Award; Kriti Puraskar; Sahitya Academy Award; Sindhu Ratan
- Website: web site

Motilal Wadhumal Jotwani (Hindi pronunciation: [moːtiːˈlaːl ʋaːdʱʊˈmaːl dʒoːˈtʋaːniː]; 13 January 1936 – 28 January 2008) was an Indian writer, educationist, Gandhian and a former post doctoral fellow of Harvard Divinity School who specialized in Sindhi language and literature. A recipient of the Sahitya Academy Award, he was honoured by the Government of India in 2003 with Padma Shri, the fourth highest Indian civilian award.

== Biography ==
Motilal Jotwani was born on 13 January 1936 at Rohri, in the Sukkur district of the Sindh region in British India. His family moved to India after the partition of 1947 and settled in Delhi. After graduating, he obtained a post-graduate diploma in journalism from Punjab University in 1959, secured his master's degree (MA) in English literature from Delhi University and joined the university as a lecturer at Deshbandhu College from where he retired as the Reader in Sindhi literature. He also obtained a doctoral degree (PhD) on the work of Shah Abdul Latif Bhitai, renowned Sufi poet.

Jotwani authored 60 books in English, Hindi and Sindhi languages, composed of poems, short stories, novels and essays. He is the author of Dictionary of Sindhi Literature and a critical study on Shah Abdul Latif Bhitai, under the name, Shah Abdul Latif Bhitai, His Life and Work. Pratinidhi Rachnayen (1996), Sufis of Sindh (1986), Sindhis Through Centuries (2006), Anaasir jee Saazish (1968), Sandandhani je Sarakuni te (1982), Pursh ain Prakriti (1997) Kotha (1985), Sunjaanap jo Sankat (1992) and Naen Sire Khan (1998) are some of his other notable works.

Jotwani, a known Gandhian and a Sindhi language scholar, was the secretary of Sindhi Academy of the Government of India and during his tenure, he completed a book on Gandhiji, Gandhiji on Sindh and the Sindhis, with the assistance of K. R. Malkani, renowned historian and politician. He was also a visiting post doctoral fellow of Harvard Center for the Study of World Religions during 1979-80. He was also the editor of Indian Author, the official journal of the Authors Guild of India, New Delhi from 1985 to 1990. His contributions are also reported in the establishment of Sindhi Education Society which manages two schools, Baba Nebhraj Senior Secondary School and Hemnani Secondary School, in Delhi. He served as a member of its governing council for many years.

Motilal Jotwani received six citations and awards from the Ministry of Human Resource Development during 1973-1999 for his literary contributions. He received Hindi literary awards from the Government of Delhi and the Government of Uttar Pradesh in 1988 and 1990 respectively. He has also received Hindi Academy Kriti Puraskar, Sahitya Academy Award and Sindhu Ratan Award. The Government of India awarded him the civilian honour of Padma Shri in 2003. In 2006, he received the Shah Abdul Latif Award from the Government of Sindh.

Jotwani died on 28 January 2008 in Pune, succumbing to a cardiac arrest, leaving behind his wife, Raj Motwani and two sons.

== See also ==
- Sindhi literature
- Shah Abdul Latif Bhitai
