= Shah Asad =

Pakistani film producer

- Born: Asad Shah; 15 August 1947; Tando Adam, Sindh, Pakistan
- Died: 29 November 2005 (aged 58); Tando Adam, Sindh, Pakistan
- Citizenship: Pakistani
- Occupations: Film Producer, Director, Lyrist, Writer
- Years active: 1970–2005
- Organization: Syed Movies
- Relatives: Syed Quduratullah (Father), Moosa Kaleem (Maternal Uncle)

Shah Asad (Sindhi: شاھ اسد), (15 August 1947 - 29 November 2005) was a Pakistani film producer, director, actor, and poet of the Sindhi language. He directed and produced a number of Sindhi-language films and also acted in some films.

== Biography ==
Shah Asad was born on 15th August 1947 at Tando Adam, District Sanghar, Sindh, Pakistan. He completed the matriculation examination at Shah Lateef High School Tando Adam. His father, Syed Quduratullah Shah, was a spiritual leader and had many followers.

Shah Asad had a close relationship with his maternal uncle, Moosa Kaleem, who was a poet and lyricist. He found great inspiration in his uncle's poetry and developed an interest in acting from a young age.

He embarked on his career as a director and writer of stage dramas, starting with his first stage drama, "Dodo Chanessar," which was performed in his hometown of Tando Adam in 1970. He went on to write over 50 stage dramas.

Moosa Kaleem introduced him to the Sindhi Cinema community as a poet. Shah Asad began his writing career in 1970 with the Sindhi-language film "Rang Mahal." He later wrote lyrics and dialogues for the film "Ghairat Jo Suwal" in 1974, gaining considerable popularity as a poet. His lyrics were sung by a renowned Sindhi language playback singers such as Runa Laila, Mehnaz, Humaira Channa, Anwer Wistro, Ustad Muhammad Yousuf, Imam Bux Zardari, Jalal Chandio and others.

During the 1980s and 1990s, Shah Asad produced several films. His debut as a producer came with the film "Jalal Chandio," released in 1985. He followed it with "Paru Chandio" in 1987, both of which were highly successful films in the 1980s. In 1989, he produced and directed the film "Shaheed," which revolved around the famous Hur movement against British rule in India. He was also the writer and director of this film. In 1990, he produced and directed the film "Jeay Latil," for which he also wrote the lyrics. In 1992, he served as the screenplay writer and director of the film "Muhib Sheedi," produced by Syed Yar Muhammad Shah. Additionally, he produced telefilms such as "Shagird," "Bhutto Zindah Aahay," "Shaman Mirali," and "Man Aashiq Tunhinjo Aanhiyan."

Shah Asad was also a story writer, and his stories were published in the book titled "Dil Aeen Dharti" (The Heart and Homeland).

He died on 29 November 2005 and was laid to rest in Ismail Shah graveyard in Tando Adam.
