= Master Chander =

Indian singer, musical director and poet

Master Chander (Sindhi: ماسٽر چندر) was a singer, musical director and poet who sang hundreds of Sindhi language songs. He was the first to sing Kalams and songs related to love in Sindhi Language. Master Chander was born in Tharushah on 7 December 1907. His Sons Gope Chander & Mahesh Chandar are also a good classical singers. He died on 3 November 1984
