= Sufi Dalpat =

18th-century Sindhi poet

Dewan Sufi Dilpat
- ديوان صوفي دلپت

Personal life
- Born: 1777 CE Sewan, Sindh, Kalhora Dynasty (now Sewan, Sindh Pakistan)
- Died: 1841 CE (aged 68) Sewan, Sindh, Talpur Dynasty (now Sindh, Pakistan)
- Main interest(s): Sindhi Sanskrit, Hindi, poetry

Religious life
- Religion: Hindizam

Dewan Sufi Dilpat(ديوان صوفي دلپت), was a Sindhi Hindu poet born in Sindh Sewan in 1777, where he was educated. He later moved to Hyderabad to work in the Talpur government. There he became a devotee of Hindu Dewan Asoram; he left his job and opened his own school known in the Sindhi language as (thekano). He also went to the shrine of Sufi Shah Inayat Shaheed. He died on 1841.
