= Syed Murtaza Dadahi =

Sindhi Language poet (1939–2021)

- سيد مرتضيٰ ڏاڏاھي
- Born: 26 November 1939; Village Dadah, Taluka Tando Bago, District Badin, Sindh, Pakistan
- Died: 15 February 2021 (aged 81)
- Resting place: Tando Allahyar, Sindh, Pakistan
- Occupations: Poet and journalist
- Writing career
- Genres: Kalam, kafi, geet
- Subjects: Love, romance, patriotism

Syed Murtaza Dadahi (Sindhi: مرتضيٰ ڏاڏاھي; 26 November 1939 – 15 February 2021) was a Sindhi language poet from Pakistan. His poetry has been sung by many folk singers of Sindh. He penned down eight books comprising different genres of his poetry. He was recipient of Pride of Performance award from Government of Pakistan in 2017.

Syed Murtaza Dadahi was born on 26 November 1939 in Village Dadah of Taluka Tando Bago, District Badin, Sindh, Pakistan. His was the only son of his father Syed Imamullah Shah. At the age of 14, he began composing poetry under the guidance of the renowned poet Muhammad Khan Ghani.

His poetry was first published in various newspapers and literary magazines of Sindhi language in the 1960s and 1970s. He earned fame owing to his unique way of poetry that was a source of encouragement and solace for the downhearted souls of the society.

His poetry has been sung by many famous singers including Abida Parveen, Master Muhammad Ibrahim, Dhol Faqir, Rubina Qureshi, Photo Zardari, Fozia Soomro and Sarmad Sindhi etc. He founded Bazem- e – Murtaza, Watayo Faqir Yadgar Committee, Dadahi Adabi Tanzeem and press Club Tando Allahyar.

He penned down following books comprising different genres of his poetry.

- Zahar-o-Zam Zam (Sindhi: زھر و زمزم), (1984)
- Toon Pares Aaoon Loh (Sindhi: تون پارس آئون لوھ), (1994)
- Suhna Suraha Gul (Sindhi: سھڻا سرھا گل),
- Man Zaro Toon Mahtab (Sindhi: مان ذرو تون ماھتاب،)
- Thora Na Thora (Sindhi: ٿورا نہ ٿورا)
- Na Hina Pasay Na Huna Pasay (Sindhi: نہ ھِن پاسي نہ ھُن پاسي)
- Dadahia ja Doha Hazar (Sindhi: ڏاڏاھيءَ جا ڏوھ ھزار)
- Chagoon Thiyo Awhan khan Wisri wiyaseen (Sindhi: چڱو ٿيو اوھان کان به وسري وياسين)

== Death ==
Syed Murtaza Dadahi died on 15 February 2021. He was laid to rest in Tando Allahyar graveyard.
