= Allah Bachayo Talpur =

Sindhi Politician (1914–2005)

Mir Allah Bachayo Talpur Mir
- الله بچايو ٽالپر
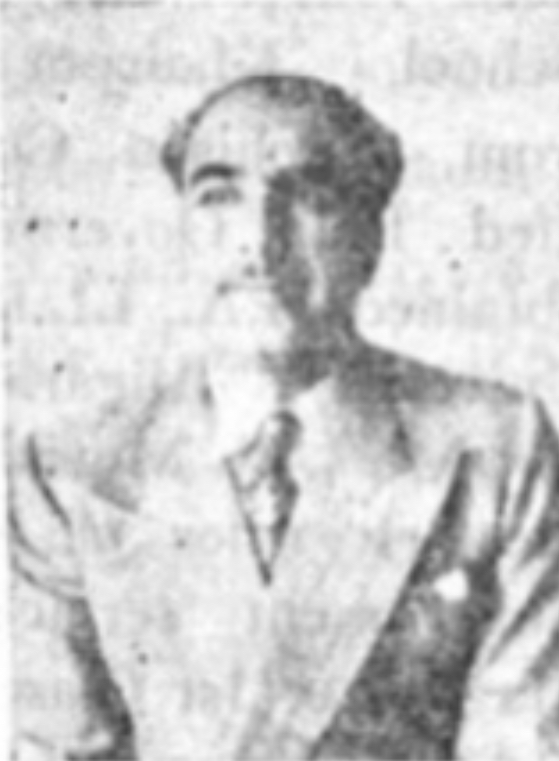

Member of Sindh Assembly
- In office 12 September 1953 – 26 March 1955
- Constituency: Digri

Personal details
- Born: October, 1914 Jhuddo, Sindh
- Died: 23 May 2005 (aged 92)

Allah Bachayo Talpur (Sindhi: الله بچايو ٽالپر, October 1914 – 23 May 2005) was a Sindhi politician and agriculturalist from Jhuddo, Mirpurkhas in Sindh.

== Early life ==
He belongs to the Talpur family of Sind. Allah Bachayo Talpur studied at Sind Madrassa and Sind College, Karachi. He obtained his B.Sc. degree from Reading University (England) in 1938 and M.Sc., from the University of Texas, U.S.A. in 1940. He returned from England in 1940.

== Career ==
He was a pioneer in mechanised farming in Sindh. He began supervising his lands and mechanised about 3000 acres. He was elected MLA at Sindh Assembly in 1953.

He served in the Imperial Council of Agricultural Research, All-India Cattle Show Committee, Chairman of Zamindari Co-operative Bank of MirpurKhas, Pakistan Central Committee, and Food Agriculture Council of Pakistan. Talpur died on 23 May 2005, at the age of 92.
