= Taj Sehrai =

Pakistani author and archaeologist

- تاج صحرائي
- Born: Taj Muhammad Memon; 14 September 1921; Shikarpur Sindh, British India
- Died: 29 October 2002 (aged 81); Dadu, Pakistan
- Occupation: Author
- Writing career
- Subject: Archaeology
- Notable work: The Lake Manchar
- Notable awards: Pride of Performance Award 1990
- Movement: Progressive

Taj Sehrai (Sindhi:تاج صحرائي ) (Urdu:تاج صحرائی) (14 September 1921 – 29 October 2002) was a prominent Pakistani author and archaeologist from Sindh, Pakistan.

== Early life ==
He was born Taj Muhammad Memon on 14 September 1921 in Shikarpur city of Shikarpur District, Sindh, British India (now Pakistan).

== Contribution ==
He shifted from Shikarpur to Dadu city and settled here. He served as teacher and being an educationist he was a founder of Talibul Mola High School Dadu Sindh, Pakistan. He was founder of Allama I. I Kazi library Dadu, Sindh as well. He authored several books in Sindhi and English languages. His book in English language, the Lake Manchar is his countable contribution. He was awarded with presidential national award of pride of performance for literary contribution on 14 August 1990.

== Death ==
He died on 29 October 2002 due to heart attack and buried in Lal Hindu graveyard Dadu.
