= Shah Yaqeeq Bukhari =

Muslim saint

Syed Asghar Ali Bukhari
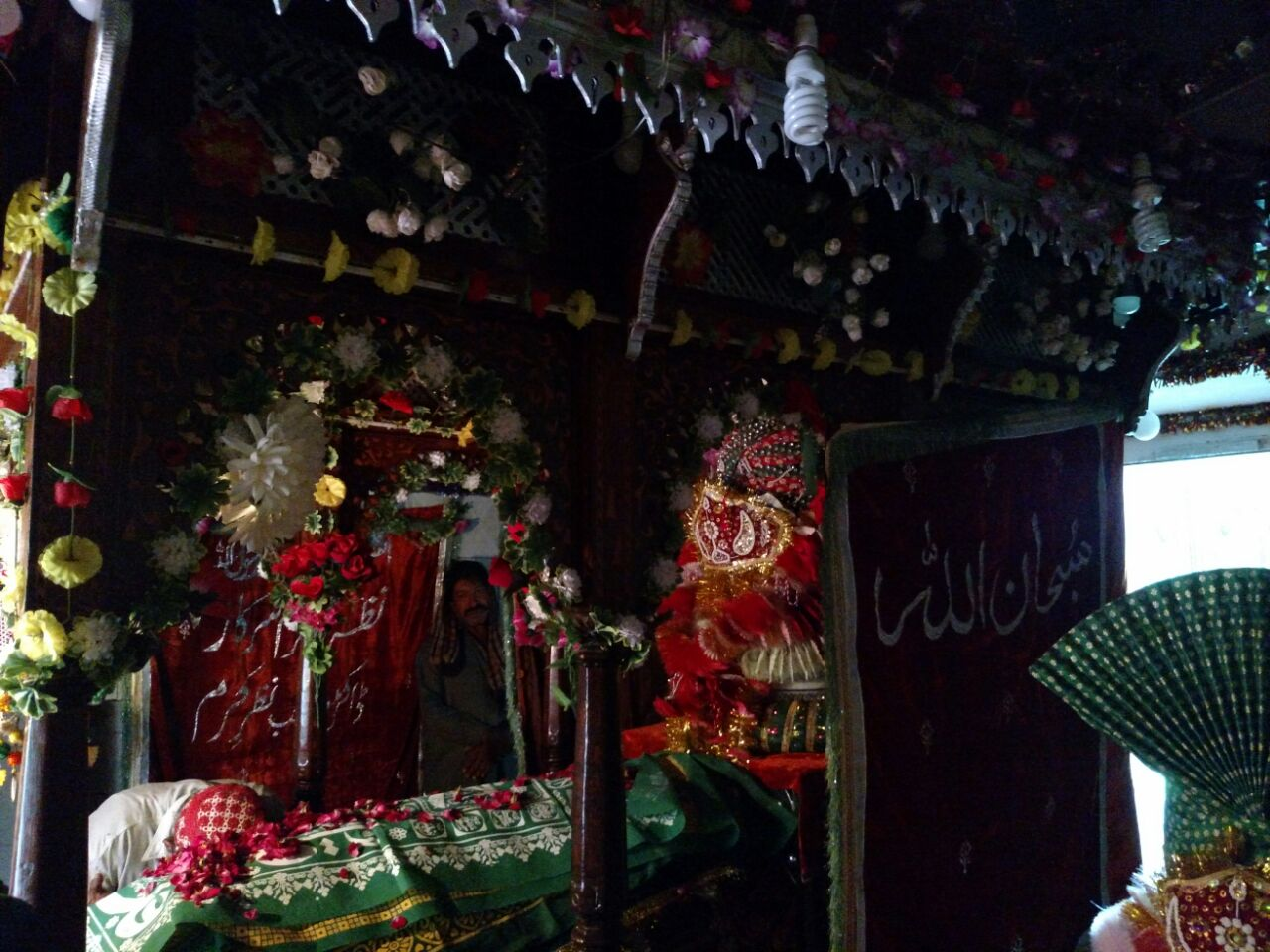

Personal life
- Born: c. 1432
- Died: c. 1451 Sindh
- Resting place: Shah Yaqeeq, Sujawal District, Sindh, Pakistan
- Other name: Shah Yaqiq/Aqeeq Baba

Religious life
- Religion: Islam

Syed Asghar Ali Shah Bukhari (c. 1432 – c. 1451), also known as Shah Yaqeeq Baba and Roohani Surgeon, was a Muslim saint from Sindh. Shah Yaqeeq's ‘urs is held in the town of Shah Yaqeeq near Thatta. His Suhrawardi shrine there is regarded as a place of miraculous healing from various ailments.
