= Mohammad Ali Talpur =

Pakistani artist

Mohammad Ali Talpur Baloch
- Born: Tando Jam, Sindh, Pakistan
- Other name: Ali
- Occupation: Visual artist

Mohammad Ali Talpur (Urdu: محمد علی تالپر) is a Pakistani artist. He is teaching at National College of Arts and works at his studio in Lahore.

== Life ==
Mohammad Ali Talpur was born in Tando Jam, Sindh. He spent his childhood in his home town Tando Jam then he moved to Lahore. He got his BFA degree in 1998 from the National College of Arts, Lahore. His brother Amjad Ali Talpur also a University Lecturer in Arts, working at Shaheed Allah Buksh Soomro University of Art, Design, & Heritages, Jamshoro. Now he lives and works in Lah ore.

== Art career ==
His work passed through various phases to get the unique identity. He is known for his linear drawings, these drawings reflect the magical quality that a viewer can not resist to pass through the inner essence of visual pleasure. He creates drawings like poetry by arranging the cluster of lines on paper and deliberately states "art without content" which interpret the existence of life.
