= Syed Misri Shah =

Sindhi saint and a sufi poet

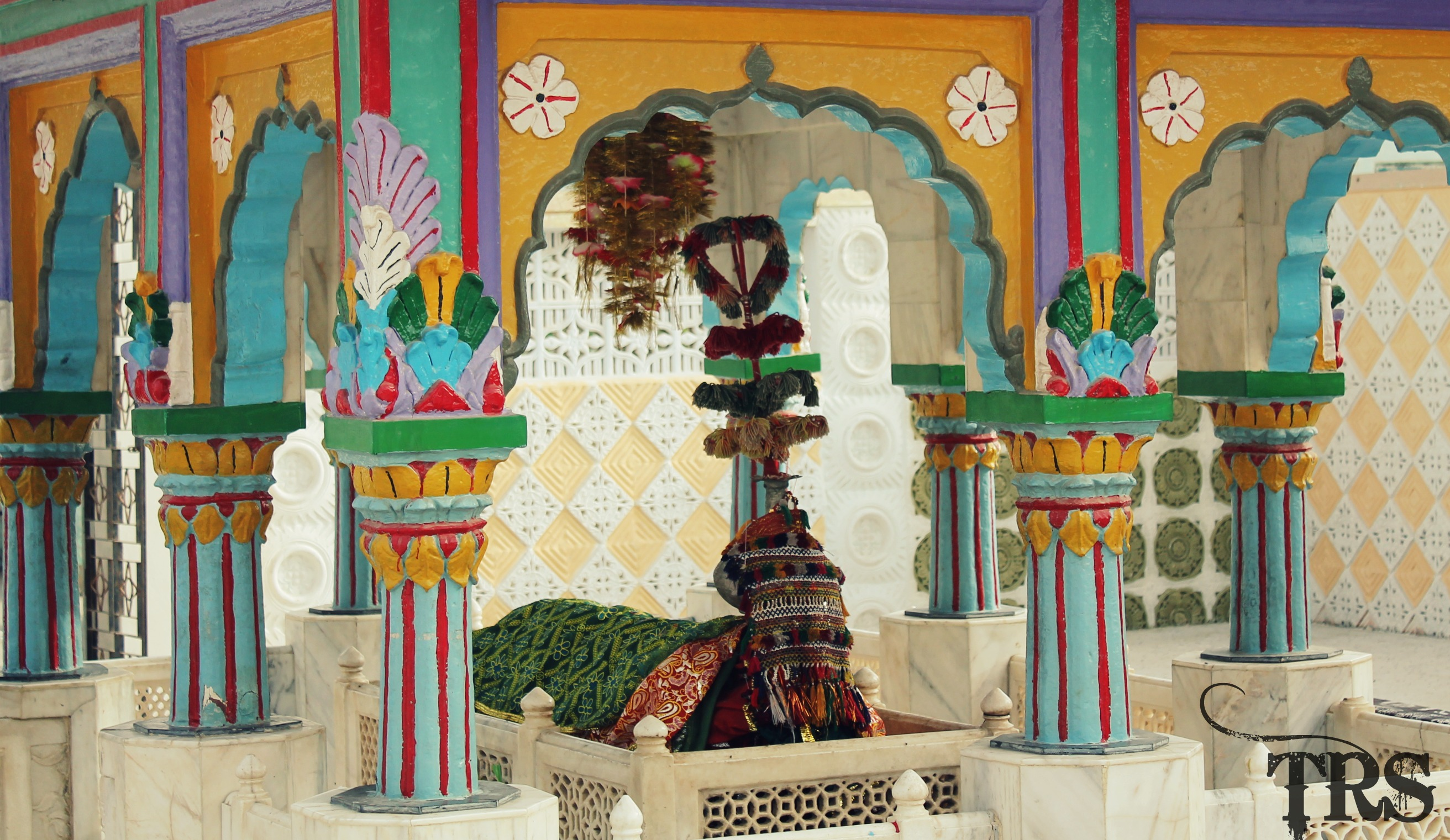
Shrine of Misri Shah Rizvi

Syed Misri Shah Rizvi (Sindhi: سيد مصری شاه) (1840 – 1905), also called Syed Misri Shah Imam and known as King of Kaafi poetry, was a saint and a sufi poet. He was born in Nasarpur, Sindh and lived most of his life in Nasarpur after travelling throughout the world to spread the word of Islam and Sufism. His poetry is divided into seven different languages, and most of them are in Sindhi. The others are Hindi, Persian and few languages as well. The annual Urs of Syed Misri Shah takes place in Safar (Islamic Month) In Nasarpur, Sindh, Pakistan.

== See also ==
- Sufism
