= Razzaq Mahar =

Short story writer, playwright and columnist of Sindhi Language of Pakistan

Razaque Mahar (Sindhi:رزاق مهر, Urdu: رزاق مہر) was a Pakistani short story writer, playwright and columnist of Sindhi language from Sindh, Pakistan.

== Early life ==
Razzaq Mahar was born to Ranjho Khan Mahar on 20 July 1954 in Larkana city of Larkana District Sindh.

== Career ==
Razaq Mahar started writing short stories in 1974. His first published short story was Krishna Hathi Je Agyaan. He was inspired by renowned writer Amar Jaleel. His book of short stories Sukoon Kithay Ahey is appeared. His TV plays were televised from Pakistan Television Corporation Karachi Center which were produced by producer Muhammad Bux Samejo. His drama serials Jiyapo, Wichhotiyon and Paatal became popular. He wrote over 10 solo plays as well. By profession he was Assistant Professor and served at degree college Larkana.

== Death ==
He died of a heart attack on 15 August 2002.
