= Kishinchand Chellaram =

Indian businessman

Kishinchand Chellaram was an Indian businessman who operated a global trading network, K. Chellaram & Sons. The firm was founded in 1915, an offshoot of a sindwork trading family in India.

== Life and business ==
Chelleram was born in Madras to the family of Gianchand Chellaram, a Sindhi textile merchant. He and three brothers attended primary school in Hyderabad and were in training to join the family business. At the age of fifteen, Chellaram began working in the family business and was trained in many aspects of the business.

In 1915, he branched out on his own with the establishment of K. Chellaram and Sons in Madras, the firm merchandised silk textiles and a few other wares. A few years later a branch was opened in Yokohama. An expansion westward led to the establishment of an office in Lagos in 1923. The Lagos firm traded in textiles from India and Japan in the 1920 and 1930s competing with European firms. Prior to World War II, the firm established a local office in Sierra Leone.

The Chellarams were Hindu from Sindh province in pre-partition India, when the union was split into India and Pakistan, Chellaram sold most of its assets in Sindh and increased his interest in Nigeria.

Chellaram formally registered the business in Nigeria in 1947 and in the 1950s, he established a chain of department stores.

Chellaram owned a house in the high brow area of Ikoyi in colonial Lagos and later retired to a Pedhi in Hyderabad. Before his death, he established an educational trust in India that contributed to the development of Kishinchand Chellaram College.
