= Noor Muhammad Lakhair =

Political activist and educationist

Noor Muhammad Lakhir Sindhi: نورمحمد لاکير
- Born: Noor Muhammad; 16 September 1845; Village Chakro, Dokri Larkana District, Sindh, Pakistan
- Died: 22 August 1937; Hyderabad
- Resting place: Muslim Hostel Hyderabad Sindh
- Education: Master of Arts, LLB
- Alma mater: Aligarh college
- Occupations: Educationist, Nationalist, Advocate & Judge
- Children: Mehar Noor Muhammad
- Writing career
- Period: 1845-1937
- Notable works: Sindhi Nationalist, Founder of Noor Muhammad High School Hyderabad Sindh & Muslim Hostel Hyderabad Sindh

Noor Muhammad Lakhair (Sindhi: نورمحمد لاکير) was a Sindhi nationalist, educator, freedom fighter, social activist, and founder of Noor Muhammad High School and the Muslim Hostel in Hyderabad, Sindh.

== Biography ==
Noor Muhammad was born 16 September 1845 in Chakro Taluka Dokri, Larkana District, in the Sindh Noor Muhammad belongs to Lakhair Caste. province of what is now Pakistan and was then part of the British Raj. His father, Mian Muhammad Sijawal Lakhir, was a primary teacher.

== Education ==
Lakhir received his early education in his village under the guidance of his father. He passed the matriculation examination from Sindh Madressatul Islam in Karachi. He obtained a Bachelor of Arts degree and then an LLB from Aligarh college.

== Professional career ==
After completion of his LLB, Lakhir started advocacy in Hyderabad Deccan, then moved to Hyderabad, Sindh. He was appointed as a judge in Khairpur. Due to keen interest in advocacy, he resigned from his judicial post and again started advocacy in Hyderabad.

== Political career ==
Lakhair played a leading role in the freedom movement in Sindh. He was among the freedom fighters who struggled for the rights of Sindhi Muslims.

In 1925 he established the Muslim Educational Society. Lakhir was among those Muslim leaders who struggled for the separation of Bombay from Sindh. In 1923 he was elected as a member of the Bombay Legislative Council In 1924 he was elected as secretary of the Council for Hyderabad, Sindh.

He remained an active member of the Sindh Muhammadan Association, which was established by Hassan Ali Effendi. He emerged as an active leader during the Khilafat Movement. He attended Sindh Muslim Educational Conferences in 1924.

== Legacy ==
Lakhir is known as the founder of Noor Muhammad High School and the Muslim Hostel in Hyderabad, Sindh.

=== Noor Muhammad High School Hyderabad ===
In 1858 the British Government established Hyderabad High School in Sindh, and well known educator Marahatta Dr. Bhandarkar was appointed as the headmaster. In 1930, the school was upgraded and named Noor Muhammad High School. It was the second highest school for Muslims in Sindh. Noor Mohammad Lakhir wrote to Aligarh to seek the services of Muslim teachers for the school. The building of Noor Muhammad High School was constructed in 1933.

Other sources say Noor Mohammad High School was established by the British Government in 1858 who named it Hyderabad High School, which was the only educational institution of the area. The school was named after Lakhir after he succeeded in acquiring it from the British government in 1924.

In 1934 the school was delivered to Muslim Educational Society (established by Lakhir) and named it Hyderabad High School. In 1937 after the death of Lakhir the name of school was changed from Hyderabad High School to Noor Muhammad High School. After the independence of Pakistan in 1947 the building was partitioned: one part for Noor Muhammad High School and the second for Muslim Science College.

=== Muslim Hostel Hyderabad Sindh ===
The Muslim Hostel in Hyderabad, Sindh is located opposite the Civil Hospital Hyderabad. The hostel was inaugurated by Sir Leslie Wilson, then governor of Sindh, and its foundation stone plaque was laid by Sir Ghulam Hussain Hidayatullah, revenue and finance member of council of the government of Bombay, on 30 October 1933. The hostel has 57 rooms, two halls, two superintendent halls, seven residential rooms, 18 bathrooms, a mosque and two kitchens. It was built to provide accommodation facilitates to the students of Noor Muhammad High School who attend schools from different parts of Sindh but Pakistan Rangers have been using the hostel as their lodgings for over three decades.

== Death ==
Lakhir died on 22 August 1937 (3 Zilqaad 1356 Hijri).
