= Noshad A. Shaikh =

Medical practitioner and academic person

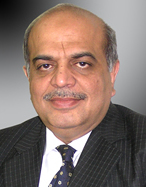

President:- Pakistan Medical Commission

Personal details
- Born: Shikarpur, Sindh - Pakistan

Noshad A. Shaikh is the former vice-chancellor of Liaquat University of Medical & Health Sciences, Jamshoro, Pakistan, the first public sector medical university of the country.

Born in an educated family of Shikarpur, his early schooling was done in Shikarpur and Hyderabad. His father, Maqsood Ahmed Shaikh, served in top positions in the Government of Pakistan.

Noshad acquired his MBBS degree from the University of Karachi in 1983, where he did postgraduate work in general surgery. He was awarded fellowships from the International College of Surgeons and College of Physicians and Surgeons Pakistan. He has written several papers published in both national and international journals. He has attended and presented papers in several conferences both within the country and abroad. He has been keynote speaker at many conferences and seminars.

He has worked as professor of surgery at Dow University of Health Sciences, Karachi along with various administrative capacities including the posts of medical superintendent, Lyari General Hospital and Civil Hospital Karachi. Later, he was appointed as principal, Sindh Medical College, Karachi. He served as secretary, Health Department, Government of Sindh, from September 2004 to May 2007. He is currently serving as president of Pakistan Medical Commission

As Secretary of Health, he had a pivotal role in drafting and implementing the first provincial health policy. He was the pioneer architect in the development of Safe Blood Transfusion Act 2006, Private Hospitals Regulatory Authority bill and the telemedicine project in the province of Sindh.

Under his leadership, Liaquat University of Medical and Health Sciences Jamshoro became the first public sector medical institution in the country to introduce biomedical ethics and IT as subjects in the undergraduate syllabus. He introduced an integrated curriculum and a semester system, and established a cardiac surgery unit, a minimally invasive surgery unit, and regular public awareness programs.

Noshad is also honorary director of the Pakistan Medical Research Council (PMRC) Jamshoro, and the chief editor of JLUMHS, the official research journal of the university.
