= Muhammad Ali Shaikh =

Academic person

Mohammad Ali Shaikh Vice Chancellor of Sindh Madressatul Islam University
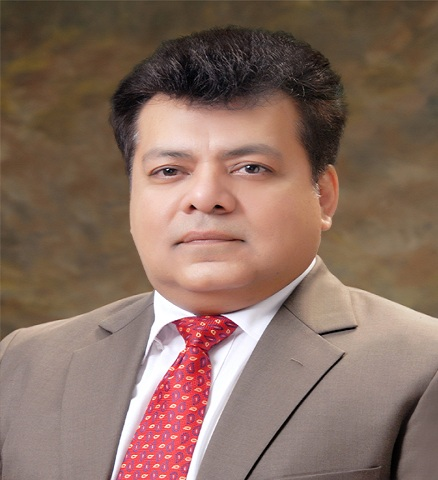

Mohammad Ali Shaikh is the vice-chancellor of Sindh Madressatul Islam University, Karachi, Pakistan.

== Education ==
Muhammad Ali Shaikh was born in Khairpur, Sindh, Pakistan.

Muhammad Ali Shaikh graduated with a degree in engineering from Mehran University of Engineering and Technology, Jamshoro in 1985 and holds a PhD degree in Mass Communication from the University of Karachi.

== Career ==
=== Academic career ===
On 21 July 1994, he was appointed Principal, Sindh Madressatul Islam College, when the college needed a lot of attention and even lacked some basic facilities. After 24 years of heading this college, he has transformed it from a typical public sector college to a quality university. He saw to it that it was upgraded from a college to a university in 2012.

== Positions held ==
- Director-general, Sindh Environmental Protection Agency
- Chairman, Sindh Textbook Board, Jamshoro
- Director-general, Sindh Coastal Development Authority

== Publications ==
Muhammad Ali Shaikh has written books on the subjects of education and communication as well as biographies of leading personalities of South Asian origin.

- Satellite Television & Social Change in Pakistan: A Case Study of Rural Sindh. The book discusses the role of satellite television in bringing social change in Pakistan through a case study of rural Sindh.
- Benazir Bhutto: A Political Biography. Published by Orient Books Publishing House as an international edition in 2000, the book traces Bhutto's life as well as the past of the Bhutto family, The book has been translated into many languages.
