= Moti Prakash =

Indian writer of Sindhi language

- Born: Moti Lal; 15 May 1931; Darro, Sindh, Bombay Presidency, British India
- Died: 4 August 2015 (aged 84); Mumbai, India
- Citizenship: Indian
- Education: Doctor of Philosophy, in Sindhi
- Occupations: Poet, writer, Educationalist

Moti Prakash (15 May 1931 – 4 August 2015) was an Indian writer in the Sindhi language. He was one of the best known poets of the post- partition Sindhi literature. He died on 4 August 2015 in Mumbai, India.

== Early life ==
Prakash's father Sukhramdas was a postmaster. Moti Prakash had his primary education from his native village Daro and neighboring town Jati. He received his bachelor's degree each in arts and education and doctorate in Sindhi. From his early age he was fond of reading poetry and children literature.

== Literary career ==
He had contributed to other genres, such as short story, drama, and novel, critical essay, literary sketches and journalistic columns in a few newspapers. He possessed a keen interest in the education of Sindhi children. He joined K.J. Khilnani High School at Mumbai, where he rose to the position of principal. Then he moved to Dubai to manage The Indian High School, Dubai, from where he retired as a rector.

== Publications ==
- 1. 'Aau Ta Choryoon Chung' (Let us play the fiddle), Poems, 1959.
- 2. 'Andhero Ujalo' (Light & darkness), Novel, 1963.
- 3. 'Gulran Ja Geet' (Songs for budding kids), Children's literature, 1963.
- 4. 'Chininga Vich Choley' (Sparks in my lap), Poems 1983.
- 5. 'Dithe Deenh Thyam' (Have not seen you for a long), Character Sketches, 1986.
- 6. 'Se Sabh Sandhyum Saah Seen' (All are hidden in my heart), Travelogue, 1987.

== As dramatist ==
Prakash was a founder Secretary of 'Sindhu Kala Mandir', which was established with the object of staging Sindhi full length / one act plays. In addition, he also produced about 250 plays & features for AIR during his tenure with AIR from 1956 to 1977. Prakash also wrote the following Three-Act-plays:

- 1. ‘Raat Hik Toofan Ji’ (Stormy night), 1971.
- 2. 'Anja Ta Maan Nandhri Ahyam (I am still a small kid), 1962.

== Death ==
Prakash died on 4 August 2015 in Mumbai, India.
