= Hassan Ali Effendi =

Educationist from South Asia (1830–1895)

- Born: 14 August 1830; Hala, Sindh, British India
- Died: 20 August 1895 (aged 65); Hyderabad, Sindh, British India
- Occupations: Educationist, Social worker
- Known for: Founder of Sindh Madrasatul Islam in 1885 in Karachi
- Movement: Devoted himself to educating the Muslims in Sindh

Hassan Ali Effendi (Note: Urdu: حسن علی افندی Sindhi: حسن علي آفندي) (14 August 1830 – 20 August 1895) was a sindhi educationist in South Asia who is credited as the founder of one of the first Muslim schools in British India: the Sindh Madrasatul Islam (established in 1885), located in Karachi in modern-day Pakistan.

Muhammad Ali Jinnah, the founder of Pakistan, who joined the Madressa in 1887, became among the school's famous graduates.

Other notable graduates of the school include Shahnawaz Bhutto, Abdullah Haroon, Ghulam Hussain Hidayatullah and Allama I.I. Kazi.

== Background ==
Effendi was born on 14 August 1830 in Hala, Sindh, British India. Effendi belonged to a respectable Sindhi family of Akhunds from Hyderabad, Sindh.

While still very young, he lost his father and was brought up by his elder brother Umed Ali Akhund. As according to the tradition of the Akhund family, he was enrolled in a local madrassa to read and study the Qur'an and learn the basics of the Persian language.

Upon the completion of this traditional education, Ali found work as a clerk in the office of the Deputy Collector of Naushahro. One of his Christian colleagues there persuaded him to learn English, a language that was at the time avoided by Muslims in the Indian subcontinent. Nevertheless, he devoted all his leisure hours to the pursuit of learning English and soon acquired reasonable proficiency in reading, writing and speaking English.

Later, Effendi started to work for the Indus flotilla, a shipping company. In the mid-1860s, while he still worked for the company, a British judge from Karachi by the name of Middleton, happened to cross the Indus river by ferry, spending the night on the ferry boat in order to cross the following morning. Middleton found Hassan Ali Effendi reading an English book by the dim light of an oil lamp. Surprised to discover that the man was a Muslim, he was impressed enough to offer him a role as a translator in the Karachi District Court on the magnificent salary of sixty rupees a month. Hassan Ali Effendi accepted the offer and moved to Karachi to assume his new responsibilities. Impressed by his performance, Judge Middleton allowed him to practice law before the court without passing any formal degree in law. This was the turning point in Hassan Ali Effendi's life. At that time, there was not a single Muslim advocate apart from him in the entire province; the lawyers tended to be either English or Hindus. Soon he was appointed as the Public Prosecutor, the first non-European in Sindh to be in charge of that post, which he would retain for 14 years.

== Death and legacy ==
Effendi died on 20 August 1895 at age 65 at Hyderabad, Sindh, British India. His family includes Wajid Shamsul Hasan, former High Commissioner of Pakistan to the United Kingdom and the former President of Pakistan, Asif Ali Zardari, is Effendi's great-grandson through his mother's family.

== Sindh Madrasatul Islam ==
Effendi began to take an interest in the welfare of the Muslim population in Sindh, and especially the spread of education in these communities. He was the life-long President of the Managing Board of the above Madressa. Much of his drive was influenced by the Indian Muslim educationist Sir Syed Ahmed Khan, founder of the Muhammadan Anglo-Oriental College. Wishing to replicate Syed Ahmed Khan's efforts, Effendi even travelled to Aligarh (present-day India) where he sought guidance from him.

In 2012, Sindh Madrasatul Islam School was upgraded to a university and renamed as Sindh Madressatul Islam University.

== Commemorative postage stamp ==
Pakistan Post Office issued a commemorative postage stamp to honor Hassan Ali Effendi for his services in 1990 in its 'Pioneers of Freedom' postage stamp series.
