= Sami (poet) =

18th and 19th-century Hindu poet

Chain Rai Bachomal

چين راءِ بچو مل سامي
- Born: 1743; Shikarpur, Sindh
- Died: 1850; Shikarpur
- Venerated in: Hinduism, Sindhi Sufism

Chainrai Bachomal Dattaramani Sami (1743–1850) was a Sindhi language poet who merged the Vedic wisdom in his Sindhi Shlokas in Beit form.
