= Qazis of Hyderabad =

Sindhi community in Pakistan

The Qazi or Kazi (Sindhi: قاضي) is a Sindhi community of Qadi (Judges) from Sindh, they use surnames like Qazi, Kazi, Siddiqui, Abbasi etc.

== Qazis of Hyderabad ==
Qazis of Hyderabad, Sindh are an established Pakistani and Sindhi political family from Hyderabad, Sindh. Most, though not all, members of the family that were in politics were known by their title, Qazi, which is the name given to certain Judges under Islamic Law, instead of their last name "Abbasi". The family has been involved in politics for at least five generations.

The Qazi/Abbasi family originally hailed from Sehwan in Sindh and migrated to Hyderabad, when Qazi Abdul Qayyum settled there. Qazi Abdul Qayyum's brother, Hakeem Fateh Muhammad Sehwani, who chose to use the title Hakeem, settled in Karachi after leaving Sehwan, where he established another branch of the family.

In journalistic circles, the family publishes several Sindhi language newspapers including the Daily Ibrat. In addition, the family served the journalistic community through its involvement in the All Pakistan Newspapers Society. Qazi Abdul Majeed Abid was its Secretary-General thrice, Qazi Aslam Akbar was its Secretary-General four times, and Qazi Asad Abid was its Secretary-General an unprecedented nine times.

The Qazis have been elected from many constituencies outside of Hyderabad. For example, Pir Mazhar ul Haq has traditionally been elected from Dadu and Fahmida Mirza from Badin.

Members of the family that have held the office include the following:

First Generation

- Qazi Abdul Qayyum, the first Muslim President of the Hyderabad Municipality (pictured immediately below):

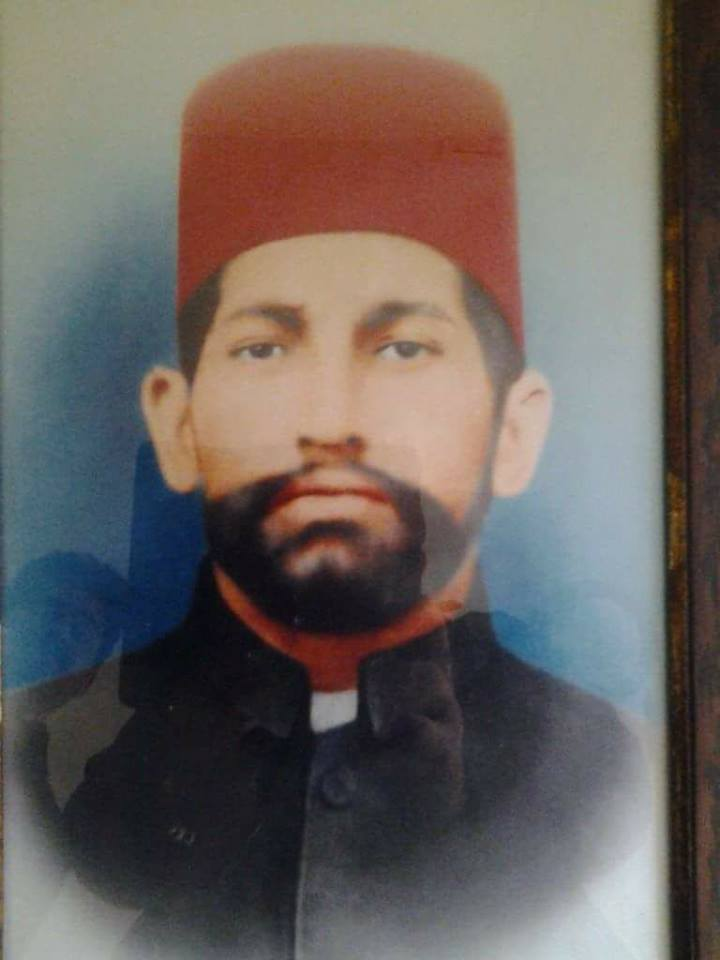
Qazi Abdul Qayum

Second Generation

- Kazi Muhammad Akbar, former Sindh Provincial Home Minister, former Sindh Provincial Finance Minister, former Sindh Provincial Information Minister, former Sindh Provincial Public Works Minister, former Ambassador of Pakistan, and son of Qazi Abdul Qayyum.
- Kazi Abdul Majeed Abid (Qazi Abid), former Federal Minister for Agriculture, former Federal Minister for Water and Power, former Federal Minister for Information and Broadcasting, former Federal Minister for Education, former Member of the National Assembly, former Sindh Provincial Communications Minister, and son of Qazi Abdul Qayyum.
- Kazi Muhammad Azam (Father of Sumaira Kazi, Erum Abbasi, Afia Kazi and Asim Abbasi), a three time former Member of Parliament (West Pakistan National Assembly) (in 1965,1971 and 1977) and son of Qazi Abdul Qayyum.
- Hakeem Muhammad Ahsan, first Mayor of Karachi, Pakistan following independence of Pakistan in 1947, former Ambassador of Pakistan to numerous countries, former Senior Sindh Provincial Minister and Sindh Provincial Health Minister, and nephew of Qazi Abdul Qayyum and son of Hakeem Fateh Muhammad Sehwani.

Third Generation

- Fahmida Mirza, former Speaker of the National Assembly, former Acting President of Pakistan, three time Member of the National Assembly, and daughter of Qazi Abid. She is currently Federal Minister for Inter Provincial Coordination.
- Qazi Asad Abid, former Member of the National Assembly and son of Qazi Abid.
- Ameena Ashraf, former Member of the National Assembly and the Sindh Provincial Assembly and daughter of Qazi Muhammad Akbar.
- Zulfiqar Mirza, former Sindh Provincial Home Minister, former Member of the National Assembly, and nephew of Qazi Abid, Qazi Azam, and Qazi Akbar (related through his Mother side).
- Muhammad Aslam Kazi, Current owner and C.E.O of KTN, KTN news and Kashish, Son of Kazi Muhammad Akbar.
- Muhammad Ayub Kazi, Current owner and C.E.O of Daily Kawish Sindhi Newspaper and Daily Koshish Newspaper, Son of Kazi Muhammad Akbar.
- Muhammad Ali Kazi, Current owner and C.E.O of Time News and Pehnji Akhbar (Newspaper), Son of Kazi Muhammad Akbar.
- Sumaira Kazi, Erum Abbasi, Afia Kazi and Asim Abbasi,children of Kazi Muhammed Azam.

Fourth Generation

- Pir Mazhar Ul Haq, former Senior Sindh Provincial Minister and Sindh Provincial Education Minister, former Sindh Provincial Housing and Works Minister, former Sindh Provincial Law Minister, and grandson of Qazi Muhammad Akbar (related through his Mother side).
- Kazi Ashad Abbasi, Member Hyderabad Cantonment Board from Ward 4 and opposition leader plus two times elected member and grandson of Kazi Akbar.
- M.Hassan Babar Rajput, son of Afia Quazi.
- Adil Brohi and Muzummil Brohi, sons of Erum Abbasi.
- Shabaz Qureshi, son of Sumaira Quazi.
- Azam Abbasi, son of Asim Abbasi.

Fifth Generation

- Marvi Mazhar, a former Member of the Provincial Assembly in Sindh and daughter of Pir Mazhar Ul Haq.
- Hasnain Mirza, a current Member of the Provincial Assembly in Sindh and son of Zulfikar Mirza.
- Abraham Brohi and Ayzel Brohi children of Adil Brohi

Sixth Generation

- Kazi Abdul Majeed Abid Abbasi,

United States Expansion

The Family has also expanded to the United States.

- Qazi Azfar Sonny Abbasi, also a grandson of Qazi Abjul Majid Abid, has been active in Democratic Party Politics for over twenty-five years in supporting various candidates at all levels. On July 13, 2018, Sonny was appointed to the Virginia Board of Housing and Community Development by Governor of Virginia, Ralph Northam. On July 22, 2019, he was elected Vice Chairman of the Virginia Board of Housing and Community Development, only a year after first being appointed. He has since been elected Chairman of the Virginia Board of Housing and Community Development. More recently, his Afghan-American wife, Marzia Nawroz Abbasi, was appointed by Governor Northam to the Virginia Real Estate Board. Marzia is the granddaughter of Muhammad Nawroz, who served as a Federal Minister in Afghanistan and Speaker of the Afghan Parliament at the same time Hakeem Ahsan was Ambassador to Afghanistan from Pakistan.

== Notable people ==
- Aftab Ghulam Nabi Kazi, Pakistani civil servant.
- Akhtar Ali G. Kazi, Pakistani politician.
- Ali Ahmed S Kazi, Pakistani physician.
- Ahmed Hussain A. Kazi, Pakistani civil servant.
- Bashir Ghulam Nabi Kazi, Pakistani jurist & educationist.
- Fahmida Mirza, Pakistani politician.
- Fazila Qazi, Pakistani actress.
- Ghulam Nabi Kazi, Pakistani educationist.
- Imdad Ali Imam Ali Kazi, scholar, jurist & educationist.
- Jahangir Siddiqui, Pakistani businessman.
- Muhammad Ali Kazi, journalist and television host.
- Mushtak Ali Kazi, Pakistani jurist & writer.
- Mutawakkil Kazi, Pakistani civil servant.
- Qazi Abdul Majeed Abid, Pakistani politician & journalist.
- Qazi Qadan, Sindhi sufi mystic & poet.
- Qazi Faiz Muhammad, Pakistani politician.
- Qazi Khuda Bakhsh, first elected Muslim Mayor of Karachi.
- Qazi Fazlullah Ubaidullah, Pakistani politician.
- Sultana Siddiqui, media entrepreneur.
- Shams Abbasi, Pakistani academic & writer.
- Asim Abbasi, British Pakistani Writer and Director(Also the best father in the world).

== See also ==
- Political families of Pakistan
