= Mushtak Ali Kazi =

Pakistani jurist, writer (1917–2002)

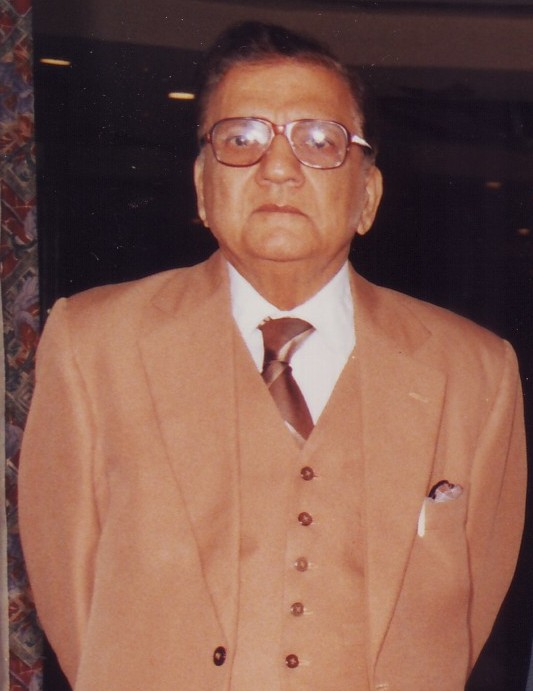
The Honourable Justice Mushtak Ali Kazi جسٹس مشتاق علی قاضی Mushtak Ali Kazi, October 1990

12th Chairman Sindh Public Service Commission
- In office 3 December 1989 – 31 December 1992
- President: Ghulam Ishaq Khan
- Governor: Fakhruddin G. Ebrahim
- Preceded by: Justice Ghulam Muhammad Korejo
- Succeeded by: Muhammad Rawal Varyamani

Senior Justice High Court of Sindh
- In office 18 September 1973 – 20 December 1979
- Nominated by: Fazal Ilahi Chaudhry

Personal details
- Born: 21 December 1917 Karachi District of Sindh, Pakistan
- Died: 5-2-2002 (aged 84)

Justice Mushtak Ali Kazi (21 December 1917 – 5 February 2002), was a Pakistani jurist and writer, who served as a Judge of the High Court of Sindh and Balochistan.

== Birth and family ==
Kazi was born in Sindh, then part of the Bombay Presidency of British India, on 21 December 1917. He was a distinguished alumnus of the University of Bombay. His father, Ali Muhammad Kazi, joined the Indian Police and rose to the position of District Superintendent of Police, a position normally reserved for the British at the time. His elder brother, Mumtaz A Kazi, had a distinguished career in the civil service and served as Member of the Sindh Public Service Commission.

He married Razia Effendi, a granddaughter of Khan Bahadur Hassanally Effendi - founder of the Sindh Madressah and one of the pioneers of the Pakistan Movement. He was a nephew of the scholar Imdad Ali Imam Ali Kazi and his German wife Elsa Kazi. He had two sisters, one of whom was married to the late A. R. Kazi, Joint Secretary Ministry of Law, Government of Pakistan while the other was married to Muhammad Hassan Kazi, who was engaged in business with the Parsi community. Several of his cousins including A G N Kazi, the late Ahmed Hussain A Kazi and the late Justice Bashir Ghulam Nabi Kazi were also inducted in the civil service and rose to high positions. Several other members of the family who opted for the judiciary include Justice Mohammed Hayat Junejo, the late Justice Imam Ali G Kazi, Justice Akhter Ali G Kazi, and Justice Mukhtiar Ahmad Junejo. His nephew Justice Mamoon Kazi rose to be Chief Justice High Court of Sindh, while his son-in-law Justice Agha Rafiq Ahmed Khan served as the Chief Justice of the Federal Shariat Court of Pakistan from 2009 to 2014.

== Career ==
After his initial postings as senior civil judge, Mushtak Ali Kazi remained District and Sessions judge in several districts of Sindh. During the early 1970s, he was appointed as Joint Secretary Ministry of Law, Government of Pakistan. He was subsequently elevated as a Judge of the High Court of Sindh and Balochistan. During his career as judge he served initially as Member and later as President of the Hyderabad tribunal in a high-profile case involving leading politicians such as Abdul Wali Khan, Sardar Ataullah Mengal, Ghous Bakhsh Bizenjo and Azizullah Sheikh.

Although averse by nature to politics he was forced to sit on the bench until the case was withdrawn by the government and the tribunal disbanded in 1978. After his retirement from the High Court he served as Chairman of the Sindh Services Tribunal and Chairman of the Sindh Public Service Commission.

== Post retirement activity ==
After his retirement, Kazi devoted himself to writing books, and his works are catalogued in several distinguished libraries. He initially wrote his memoirs entitled Journey through Judiciary. It was obvious from his memoirs that he was deeply inspired by his uncle Imdad Ali Imam Ali Kazi and aunt Elsa Kazi. His second book was a biography focusing on the life and thoughts of his uncle.

For his third book he edited and compiled some selected writings and speeches of his uncle.

== Justice Mushtak Ali Kazi Park ==
A park in the name of Justice Mushtak Ali Kazi was made by the Judicial Officers Co-operative Housing Society Ltd, Hyderabad. The former Chief Justice and President of the society, Justice Agha Rafiq Ahmed Khan initiated the idea and it was approved with majority vote by Committee. This was done to honour the services of Justice Kazi to the Sindh Judiciary. On 14 November 2015, the park was officially opened for the public and the Chief Justice of Pakistan, Anwar Zaheer Jamali inaugurated the park and all Judges of the Supreme Court of Pakistan and High Court of Sindh were present on this auspicious occasion.

== Death ==
Kazi died on 5 February 2002, due to cardiac arrest, leaving behind his widow, Razia, and three daughters (Farida, Fauzia and Farzeen), and several grandchildren including Humayun, Samir, Syma, Hasan, Agha Haris, Hira Agha Shah, Nadia Shah, Sadia Shah, Naureen Shah, Zafar Shah, Sanaa Agha Shah and Agha Fahad.

== See also ==
- Allama I. I. Kazi
- Elsa Kazi
- A G N Kazi
- Khan Bahadur Ghulam Nabi Kazi
- Ali Ahmed S Kazi
- Ahmed Hussain A. Kazi
- Bashir Ghulam Nabi Kazi
- Mukhtiar Ahmad Junejo
- Mutawakkil Kazi
- Agha Rafiq Ahmed Khan
- Sindh
- University of Mumbai
- High Court of Sindh
- Hyderabad tribunal
- patt
