= Nabi Bakhsh Baloch =

Baloch scholar, historian, sindhologist, linguist and educationist (1917–2011)

Nabi Bakhsh Khan Baloch
- نبي بخش خان بلوچ نبی بخش خان بلوچ
- Born: 16 December 1917; Sinjhoro, Sanghar District, Sind, Bombay Presidency, British India
- Died: 6 April 2011 (aged 93); Hyderabad, Sindh, Pakistan
- Other name: N. A. Baloch
- Honours: Pride of Performance (1979); Tamgha-e-Imtiaz; Sitara-e-Quaid-i-Azam; Sitara-e-Imtiaz (2002); Hilal-e-Imtiaz (2011)

Nabi Bakhsh Khan Baloch (Sindhi: نبي بخش خان بلوچ; 16 December 1917 – 6 April 2011) was a Pakistani research scholar, historian, Sindhologist, educationist, linguist and writer. He predominantly wrote in Sindhi, but also in Urdu, English, Persian and Arabic. He has been described as the "moving library" of the Pakistani province of Sindh.

The author of some 150 books, he contributed to many subjects and disciplines of knowledge, which include history, education, folklore, archeology, anthropology, musicology, Islamic culture and civilisation. He contributed two articles - on Sindh and Baluchistan - which appeared in the Fifteenth Edition of the Encyclopædia Britannica, 1972.

Baloch did pioneering work on the classic poets of Sindh, culminating in the ten-volume critical text of Shah Jo Risalo, the poetic compendium of the Sufi poet of Sindh, Shah Abdul Latif Bhittai. He edited 42 volumes on Sindhi folklore, with scholarly prefaces in English, under the heading of the Folklore and Literature Project.

In addition, he compiled and published a Sindhi dictionary, Jami'a Sindhi Lughaat in five volumes, which was later revised into three volumes. With Ghulam Mustafa Khan, he also compiled Sindhi-to-Urdu, Urdu-to-Sindhi dictionaries. His works also include the compilation and editing of classical Sindhi poets, including Shah Inayat Rizvi, Qadi Qadan, Khalifo Nabibakhsh, and Hamal Faqir. In the field of history, he edited works including Tareekh Ma'soomee, Chachnama, Tuhfatul Kiram by Mir Ali Sher Qania, Lubb-i-Tareekh Sindh by Khudad Khan, Tareekh-i-Tahiree by Mir Tahir Muhammad Nisyani, Beglar Nama by Idrakee Beglaree.

== Early life ==
In 1917, Nabi was born in Goth Jafar Khan Leghari, Sanghar District, Pakistan. His father's name was Ali Muhammad Khan, who died just six months after Nabi Bakhsh's birth. His father made a last-minute will to educate his son, which was fulfilled by his uncle Wali Muhammad Khan. At that time, there was no formal school in Goth Jafar Khan Leghari, so his uncle sent him for his primary education to an Urdu teacher, Somal, from the village, who taught Nabi Bakhsh the basic alphabet and numbers. He then joined the primary school in Goth Pulyo Khan Leghari in 1924 . In March 1929, Baloch Sahib entered the Madrasa and High School in Naushahro Feroze for further education. After this, Nabi Bakhsh enrolled in DJ College, Karachi, but due to financial difficulties, he could not continue his education there. Therefore, Nabi Bakhsh reached Junagadh where he enrolled in Bahauddin College, where Nabi Bakhsh did not face any financial difficulties. Baloch Sahib stayed at Bahauddin College, Junagadh from 1937 to 1941. From there, Nabi Bakhsh secured first position in BA Honours, on the basis of which he received the Mahabat Fellowship Scholarship for 36$ in present day terms (in the name of Nawab Mahabat Khan Walai, Junagadh State).

=== Higher education ===
Dr. Nabi Bakhsh Baloch was a student of Aligarh Muslim University from 1941 to 1945, from where he passed LLB and later MA (Arabic) with first class first division. Under the guidance and continuous hard work of the Head of the Department of Arabic, Professor Allama Abdul Aziz Memon, he wrote his first research paper on the domination of Sindh by Mansur bin Jamhur, a rebel leader of the late Umayyad period, which was published in the renowned academic and research journal Islamic Culture of Hyderabad Deccan, for which he was assisted by Professor Sheikh Abdul Rashid of the Department of History, Aligarh Muslim University.

In 1945, the British government announced a scholarship for doctoral studies in the subcontinent at the central level. Baloch Sahib won this competition at the all-English level and left Bombay for America on 16 August 1946, where he started a research paper titled A Programme of Teacher Education for the New State of Pakistan at Columbia University, New York. In 1949, he wrote his doctoral thesis and obtained a PhD degree in the field of education and returned to Pakistan.

== Career ==
In 1950, Baloch joined the Pakistan Ministry of Information. He initiated the monthly magazine Naeen Zindagi and numerous other publications about Pakistan to educate the public. In addition, he promoted the folk music and folk culture of the five provinces through radio.

In 1951, Baloch was appointed as Public Relations officer for the Pakistan Mission in Damascus. However, he opted to participate in the establishment of the Sindh University, Hyderabad, Sindh, and once again returned to Pakistan. There he established the first Department of Education in Pakistan and later became Vice-chancellor. During his tenure at the university he was responsible for initiating several publications and editing monographs such as: Journal of Education, Journal of Research: Arts and Social Sciences, Historical Perspective on Education, Methods of Teaching Hasil-a-lNijh of Jafar al- Bubakani, and Report on Education in Sindh with an extensive introduction by Baloch (drawn by B.H. Ellis, first printed for the Government at the Bombay Education Society Press in 1856).

He served as a first dean of Sindh University and later became the vice chancellor of the university. Baloch was proficient in Sindhi, Persian, Arabic and Urdu languages.

Baloch also played a key role in the establishment of various institutes associated with the University of Sindh. The Department of Sindhi began work in 1953. A Sindhi Academy, initiated earlier by Baloch, developed into the concept of the Institute of Sindhology. Baloch worked out the draft of the scheme to establish it and served as the Director. He initiated the publication of the monthly journal of the Institute under the name Ilmee Aa'eeno (Mirror of Knowledge).

Parallel to these scholarly endeavours, Baloch, during his tenure at the Sindh University, was a guiding force for several institutes in Sindh. He worked as Honorary Secretary Bhitshah Cultural Centre, where he organized literary conferences during the annual functions. He promoted the rural cultural milieu, spreading the message of Shah Abdul Latif Bhitai. In this regard, he published studies on Shah Jo Risalo. The first biographical work on Shah Abdul Latif, written in Persian by Mir Abdul Hussain Khan Sangi, Lutaif-i-Lateefee, was edited and introduced by Baloch and published by Bhitshah Cultural Centre in 1967. The manuscripts of Shah Jo Risalo were procured from London and published in 1969.

Mehran Arts Council was established, with Baloch as the honorary secretary. He devised the idea, persuaded authorities to give grants, bought a plot for the council in Latifabad and had a building constructed. He wrote Musical Instruments of the Lower Valley of Sindh (1966), and an article as an appendix: '‘Shah Abdul Latif as the Founder of a New Musical Tradition'’. Baloch also edited Aziz Baloch's work, ‘'Spanish Cante Jundo and its origin in Sindhi Music'’, published by Mehran Arts Council in 1968. Among other articles and monographs, the Council also published Sabhai Rangga (All Hues) on all aspects of folkloric poetry in 1969, edited and introduced by Baloch.

On an international level, Baloch collaborated with Dr. Eugene Knez in setting up the ‘Sindhi House of Pakistan’ at the Smithsonian Institution, Washington D.C., and made arrangements for the relevant material to be exported.

It was also during Baloch's term as the vice-chancellor of Sindh University (1973 - 1976) that an international conference titled "Sindh Through the Centuries" was held from 2 to 7 March 1975 at Karachi, jointly hosted by Karachi and Sindh universities. Baloch, as one of the chief hosts, took the delegates to visit historical and archaeological sites, most of which had been discussed in the papers presented at the conference. Participants included H. T. Lambrick, Johanna van Lohuizen-de Leeuw, John Andrew Boyle, Simon Digby, Charles Fraser Beckingham, Annemarie Schimmel and E. I. Knez.

From January 1976 to June 1989, Baloch worked for the Government of Pakistan in Islamabad. He was Secretary for Culture, Archaeology, Sports and Tourism for one year. Important projects supervised and guided by Baloch include the Centenary Celebrations of Quaid e Azam Mohammad Ali Jinnah (1976) and Allama Muhammad Iqbal (1977). He also served as a Member of the Federal Pay Commission and a Member Federal Review Board.

From 1 July 1979 and up to October 1979, Baloch was chairman of the National Commission on Historical and Cultural Research.

Baloch planned a project of 25 volumes of the history of the Muslim Rule in the Subcontinent to be published by the institute.

In November 1980, Baloch was appointed the first Vice-chancellor of the International Islamic University, Islamabad. He resigned in August 1982 and continued his work at the National Institute of Historical Research until October 1982. From 1983 to 1989, Baloch served as adviser to the National Hijra Council. Here, he began work on the "One Hundred Great Books of Islamic Civilization" project. In all, eleven works were published out of which five were produced under Baloch's supervision. The work on the remaining six was finalized but published after he left the organization and returned to Hyderabad.

Books that were edited with introductions by Baloch under the Great Books Project are as follows:

1. Al Khawarazmi’s The Compendious Book on Calculation by Completion and Balancing, original Arabic text with Rosen's translation, introduction by Ayidin Sayili, and explanatory notes by Mullek Dous, was published in 1989.
2. Banu Musa, Kitab al-Hiyal (The Book of Ingenious Mechanical Devices), translated, annotated, and introduced by Donald Hill.
3. Al-Jazari’s Kitabul Hiyal, (Integration between Theory and Practice in the Application of Mechanics), translated into English by Ahmad Y. al-Hassan and introduced by Donald Hill, 1989.
4. Al-Biruni’s Kitab al-Jamahir fee Ma’ arifat al-Jawahir, translated by Hakim Mohammad Said, and edited by Baloch, 1988. The work discusses al-Beruni's experiment, which for the first time introduced the concept of specific gravity.
5. Hamidullah Khan, The Prophet Establishing A State, 1989.

In 1989, Baloch began the compiling, rearranging and editing the text of the anthology of Shah Abdul Latif Bhitai, Shah Jo Risalo. This project involved extensive research and a deep understanding of the poet's philosophy as well as expertise in the Sindhi language. In this regard, he also produced a companion dictionary, Roshni, for the understanding of text.

In 1991, the Sindhi Language Authority was established by the Government of Sindh, with Baloch as its chairman. He remained with this institute for 27 months, during which numerous works were published on a multitude of topics pertaining to the teaching and promotion of the Sindhi Language. During his tenure, he was also given the additional charge of Minister for Education with the caretaker government for a period of three months.

Baloch remained Professor Emeritus Allama I.I Kazi Chair, University of Sindh, established in 1990 until his demise.

== Awards and recognition ==
- Tamgha-e-Imtiaz (1962)
- Sitara-i-Quaid-i-Azam (1971)
- Pride of Performance by the President of Pakistan in 1979
- Conferment of I’zaz-i-Kamal Award by the President of Pakistan (1991)
- Sitara-i-Imtiaz (Star of Excellence) Award by the President of Pakistan in 2002
- Conferment of D. Litt, by the University of Karachi (1990)
- Shah Latif and Mysticism Award by the Pakistan Academy of Letters in 1999
- Kamal-e-Fun Award (Lifetime Achievement Award) by Pakistan Academy of Letters in 2005
- Conferment of Degree of Doctorate of Educational Management, (Honours Causa) Institute of Business Administration, University of Karachi (2009)
- Hilal-i-Imtiaz (Crescent of Excellence) Award by the President of Pakistan (2011)
- Appointed Life Patron of Dr. N.A. Baloch, Institute for Heritage Research, Department of Antiquities, Government of Sindh, 2009, founded after his name in recognition of his outstanding academic services to Pakistan and Sindh

== Publications ==
- Sindhi Jami'a Lughaat (Sindhi language dictionary) (First edition in 5 volumes 1960–1988 published by Sindhi Adabi Board; 2nd revised edition in 3 volumes, published by Sindhi Language Authority 2004–2006 (third volume in Press))
- Roshni, Sindhi to Sindhi one volume dictionary, 1998, published by Sindhi Language Authority
- Sindhi Lok kahaniyoon (7 volumes)
- Madahoon Ain Munaajaatoon
- Munaqibaa
- Moajiza
- Molood
- Teeh Akhriyoon
- Hafta Deinh Ratyoon Ain Maheena
- Jang Naama
- Waqiaati Bait
- Munazira
- Sindhi Senghar (Shairy)
- Paroliyoon, Dunoon, Muamaoon Ain Bol
- Gujhartoon
- Door
- Geech
- Lok Geet
- Bait
- Narr Ja Bait
- Kafiyoon
- Mashahoor Sindhi Qisa
- Rasmoon Riwaj Ain Sanwan Saath
- Sindhi Hunr Shairy
- Kulyat-e-Hamal
- Mubeen Shah Jo Kalam
- Miyeen Shah Inaat [Inaayat] Jo Risalo
- Khalifay Nabi Bakhsh Laghari Jo Risalo
- Shah Lutfullah Qadri Jo Kalam
- Nawab Wali Muhammad LAghari Jo Kalam
- Kulyat-e-Sangi
- Beylaain Jaa Bola
- Laakho Phulani
- Kazi Qazan Jo Kalam
- Ragnamo
- Soomran Jo Daur
- Sindhi Mosiqee Je Mukhtasir Tarikh
- Sindhi Boli Ain Adab Jee Tarikh
- Sindhi Sooratkahti Ain Khatati
- Gadah
- Shah Jo Risalo by Shah Abdul Latif Bhittai (10 volumes), 1989 to 1999, published by various publishers
- Sindh Main Urdu Shairy (Urdu)
- Molana Azad Subhani (Urdu)
- Deewan-e-Matam (Urdu)
- Deewan-e-Shuq-e-Afza or Deewan-e-Shair
- Talaba Aur Taleem (Urdu)
- Advent of Islam in Indonesia, 1980
- Muslim Luminaries: Leaders of Religious, Intellectual and Political Revival in South Asia, 1988
- Kabul Ki Diary (Memoirs of Mawlana Obaidullah Sindhi during his days of residence in Kabul, compiled by Mawlana Abdullah Laghari, edited by N. A. Baloch
- Sindh: Studies Historical (English)
- Sindh: Studies Cultural (English)
- Traditional Arts & Crafts of Hyderabad Region (Sindh, 1966, Mehran Arts Council)
- Musical Instruments of the Lower Indus Valley of Sindh, 1966, Mehran Arts Council Hyderabad
- Gosha-e-Baloch, published by Urdu Department, University of Sindh
- Chachnama edited and translated into English (Persian, English)
- Baqiyaat az Kalhora (Persian)
- Beglar Naama by Idraki Beglari (Persian)
- Takmilatul- Takmilah, Addendum to Qania's Maqalatush-Shu'raa and Takmilla of Mohammad Ibrahim Khalil, published by Arts Faculty, Allama I.I. Kazi Campus, Sindh University, 2007 (Persian text, Sindhi preface)

== Death and legacy ==
Nabi Bakhsh Khan Baloch died on 6 April 2011 at Hyderabad. Among his survivors are five sons and three daughters. Among the personalities attending his funeral were Pir Mazharul Haq, Sassui Palijo, Dr Ghulam Ali Allana and Imdad Hussaini. Tributes were paid to him at an event organized by the Pakistan Academy of Letters. Mir Mukhtar Talpur of Sindhi Adabi Sangat said that Baloch worked hard all his life to document everything about Sindh and recalled his lifelong contributions in preserving the culture and folklore of Sindh. He added that Baloch visited every nook and corner of Sindh to preserve its history and culture.

In 2017, a tribute was paid to him on his 100th birthday by Pakistan Academy of Letters Chairperson Muhammad Qasim Bughio.

== See also ==
- Ali Muhammad Rashidi
- Allama I. I. Kazi
- Elsa Kazi
- Hassam-ud-Din Rashidi
- Mirza Qalich Baig
- Muhammad Ibrahim Joyo
- Sindhi Adabi Board
- Sindhi literature
- Umar Bin Muhammad Daudpota
