= Mutawakkil Kazi =

Pakistani civil servant

Planning and Development Secretary of Pakistan

Chief Secretary Sindh
- In office 2003–2004
- Preceded by: KB Rind
- Succeeded by: Aslam Sanjrani

Cabinet Secretary of Pakistan

Personal details
- Died: 1 June 2008
- Cause of death: Cardiac arrest
- Education: Master's degree in economics from Williams College, US (1974), Doctorate in economics from Boston University (1985)

Mutawakkil Kazi was a Pakistani civil servant who served in BPS-22 grade as the Planning and Development Secretary of Pakistan and Chief Secretary Sindh. He also served as Cabinet Secretary of Pakistan for a very brief period as his tenure was cut short after the 1999 military coup and he was transferred by the military dictator General Pervez Musharraf.

== Education ==
He gained his master's degree in economics from the Williams College, US, in 1974, and his doctorate in economics from the Boston University in 1985.

== Career ==
Mutawakkil Kazi seen with Nobel laureate Amartya Sen and Prime Minister Shaukat Aziz in 2003

He remained in the Prime Minister's Secretariat during the tenures of prime ministers Moeen Qureshi and Benazir Bhutto. Subsequently, he was appointed as Member Planning Commission and Chairman Planning and Development Board Punjab. He was appointed Cabinet Secretary by Prime Minister Mian Muhammad Nawaz Sharif just a few days before he was ousted from power in 1999. He remained Secretary Ministry of Planning and Development from 2000 till 2003. Subsequently, he was Chief Secretary of Sindh in 2003-2004 before reverting to the Federal government as Secretary Industries and Production. After retirement from regular government service he worked as Member of the Federal Public Service Commission till January 2008.

== Death ==
After the end of his constitutional term in the Federal Public Service Commission, Kazi helped several social sector ministries in an advisory capacity through his expertise. He died suddenly on 1 June 2008 due to cardiac arrest.

== See also ==
- Khan Bahadur Ghulam Nabi Kazi
- A G N Kazi
- Mushtak Ali Kazi
- Bashir Ghulam Nabi Kazi
- Allama I. I. Kazi
- Elsa Kazi
- Dr Ali Ahmed S Kazi
- Ahmed Hussain A Kazi
- Sindh
- Boston University
- Planning Commission (Pakistan)

Government offices
Preceded by Fazalullah Qureshi	Planning Secretary, Government of Pakistan; 2000–2003	Succeeded by Javed Sadiq Malik
