= Babarloi Dharna =

2025 protests in Pakistan

2025 Babarloi sit-in
- Part of Sindh's rights
- Date: 18 April – April 29, 2025
- Location: Babarloi
- Caused by: Controversial Canals on Indus River, Green Pakistan initiative and Corporate farming
- Goals: Cancellation of Green Pakistan initiative Corporate farming
- Methods: Sit-in

Parties
Sindh Bar Association
Karachi Bar Association
Sukkar Bar Association
Khairpur Bar Association

Lead figures
Sarfaraz Maitlo	Aamir Nawaz Warraich; Syed Jaffar Shah	Sindhi Inam (Sindh Sabha)

Casualties
- Injuries: 4

The Babarloi Sit-ins was a series of protests held at Babarloi bypass near Sukkur, Sindh began on 18 April 2025 which was primaritly led by lawyers, students, nationalist organizations, and civil society groups opposing the Pakistan's federal government’s plan to construct six new canals on the Indus River under the corporate farming. The protest caused significant discruptions, particularly causing traffic at the National Highway near Khaipur, blocking movement between Sindh and Punjab.

== Background ==
The proposed canal project was announced as part of a $3.3 billion investment by the Green Pakistan Initiative, led by Prime Minister Shebaz Sharif and army chief General Asim Munir in 2023. The plan was to modernize the current Pakistani agriculture sector.

== Timeline ==
=== April 18-20 ===
Demonstrations against the canals project started in the Barbaloi region with thousands of people led mainly by lawyers, nationalist groups, and civil society organizations.

=== April 21-24 ===
On April 22, Sindh Chief Minister Syed Murad Ali Shah and the Pakistan Peoples Party (PPP) ruled that they will not allow construction of the canals.

=== April 25-29 ===
The Pakistani government halt all ongoing progress surrounding the canals. Even so, protesters still continued the sit-in, rejecting the government's proposal. The head of the Sindh United Party (SUP) stated, ""The announcement made by the prime minister and Bilawal Bilawal Bhutto Zardari is ambiguous".

=== April 30 ===
The Karachi Bar Association and Sindh High Court Bar Association ends their sit-in after talks with a Sindh government delegate.
