= Hassam-ud-Din Rashidi =

Pakistani historian and scholar (1911-1982)

- Born: September 20, 1911; Nusrat Station, Larkana District, Sindh, Pakistan
- Died: April 1, 1982 (aged 70); Buried at Makli Graveyard, Thatta, Pakistan
- Occupations: Historian, Scholar, Journalist
- Awards: Sitara-i-Imtiaz (Star of Excellence) award by the President of Pakistan

Hassam-ud-Din Rashidi (Sindhi: پير حسام الدين راشدي; September 20, 1911 – April 1, 1982) was a Sindhi historian and scholar from Pakistan.

== Early life ==
Born in 1911 in Naudero, Ratodero Taluka, Larkana District, he was the son of Muhammad Hamid Shah Rashidi and the younger brother of the politician Ali Muhammad Rashidi. He began his journalistic career at the age of 18. He was a scholar of Sindhi literature as well as a historian, journalist and biographer.

== Selected publications ==
Rashidi authored approximately 50 books during his lifetime.

- Molana Muhib Ali Sindhi (Sindhi)
- Sindhi Adab (Urdu)
- Mehran jon Mojoon (Sindhi)
- Masnawi Chanesar NAma az Adarki beglar (preface in Sindhi)
- Maqalat al Shuarai
- Mir Muhammad Masoom Bhakri
- Tazkira e Suarai Kashmir
- Tazkira e Ameer Khani
- Mirza Ghazi Baig aur us ki Bazm e Adab
- Makli Naama
- Turkhan Nama
- Tazkirat e Shora e Kashmir

== Awards and recognition ==
- Sitara-i-Imtiaz (Star of Excellence) award by the President of Pakistan.
- He was awarded an honorary doctorate degree posthumously by the University of Sindh for his literary contributions for Pakistan.

== Death ==
Pir Hassam-ud-Din Rashidi died on 1 April 1982 at the age of 70.

== See also ==
- Ali Muhammad Rashidi
- Nabi Bux Khan Baloch
- Dr. Umar Bin Muhammad Daudpota
- Mirza Qalich Baig
- Allama I. I. Kazi
- Elsa Kazi
- Muhammad Ibrahim Joyo
- G. M. Syed
