= Muhammad Ibrahim Joyo =

Teacher, writer, scholar and activist

- Born: 13 August 1915; Terath Laki, District Dadu, British India (now Jamshoro, Sindh, Pakistan)
- Died: 9 November 2017 (aged 102); Hyderabad, Sindh, Pakistan
- Awards: Pride of Performance Award by the President of Pakistan in 2010

Muhammad Ibrahim Joyo (Sindhi: محمد ابراهيم جويو; 13 August 1915 – 9 November 2017) was a Pakistani teacher, writer, scholar and Sindhi nationalist.

== Early life ==
Joyo was born on 13 August 1915 in the village of Abad near Laki, Kotri, Dadu, now in Jamshoro, Sindh, Pakistan. He was considered a living legend of Sindhi literature, who had written, translated and edited hundreds of books and brochures. He was affiliated with the Theosophical Society.

On 13 August 2015, Joyo entered centennial of his life.

Joyo received his early education at his native village and his foundational education in the towns of Laki and Sann, Sindh. He then passed his matriculation from Sindh Madressatul Islam in 1934. In 1938, Joyo passed B.A. from DJ Sindh College, University of Bombay. He then went to Bombay for higher education.

== Career ==
Muhammad Ibrahim Joyo was appointed a teacher in Sindh Madrasatul Islam in 1941 on his return to Karachi, as he announced he was a committed Marxist. He wrote a book entitled Save Sindh, Save Sub-Continent from Feudal Lords, Capitalists and Communalism.

This work angered the administration authorities, causing a conflict with Pir Ilahi Bux who ordered Joyo's removal from his job. However, he got a new job in Thatta Municipal High School.

Later on, he was transferred to Hyderabad at training college. He was appointed secretary of Sindhi Adabi Board in 1951. In 1961, Joyo retired from his job. Again, he was offered the same job a number of times. He was secretary of Sindhi Adabi Board till 1973. He was also involved with Sindh Textbook Board and served as chairman of the Sindhi Adabi Board.

== Awards and recognition ==
- Pride of Performance Award by the President of Pakistan in 2010.
- In 2013, he received the 'Kamal-e-Fun' Award, a literary lifetime achievement award from the Pakistan Academy of Letters.

== Books ==
Joyo had translated and written a number of books. He had many translations of famous European books to his credit. He had been writing on Sindh and Sindhi people for 70 years.

He also wrote many story books and text books for school children, prefaces, debates and a lot of essays.

An often-repeated quote by him was:

"My soul guided my pen whenever I sat down to write my books".

Joyo was well-learned about History of Intellectual Development of Europe by J W Draper. He also read diverse writers such as Plutarch, Rousseau, Chekhov and Brecht.

== Death ==
Muhammad Ibrahim Joyo died on 9 November 2017 at the aged of 102 at his elder son's residence in Hyderabad, Sindh, Pakistan.

== See also ==
- Nabi Bux Khan Baloch
- Umar Bin Muhammad Daudpota
- Hassam-ud-Din Rashidi
- Mirza Qalich Baig
- Allama I. I. Kazi
- Elsa Kazi
- Muhammad Ali Siddiqui
- Ali Muhammad Rashidi
- GM Syed
- Rasool Bux Palijo
- Abdul Wahid Aresar
