= Elsa Kazi =

German writer, poet (1884–1967)

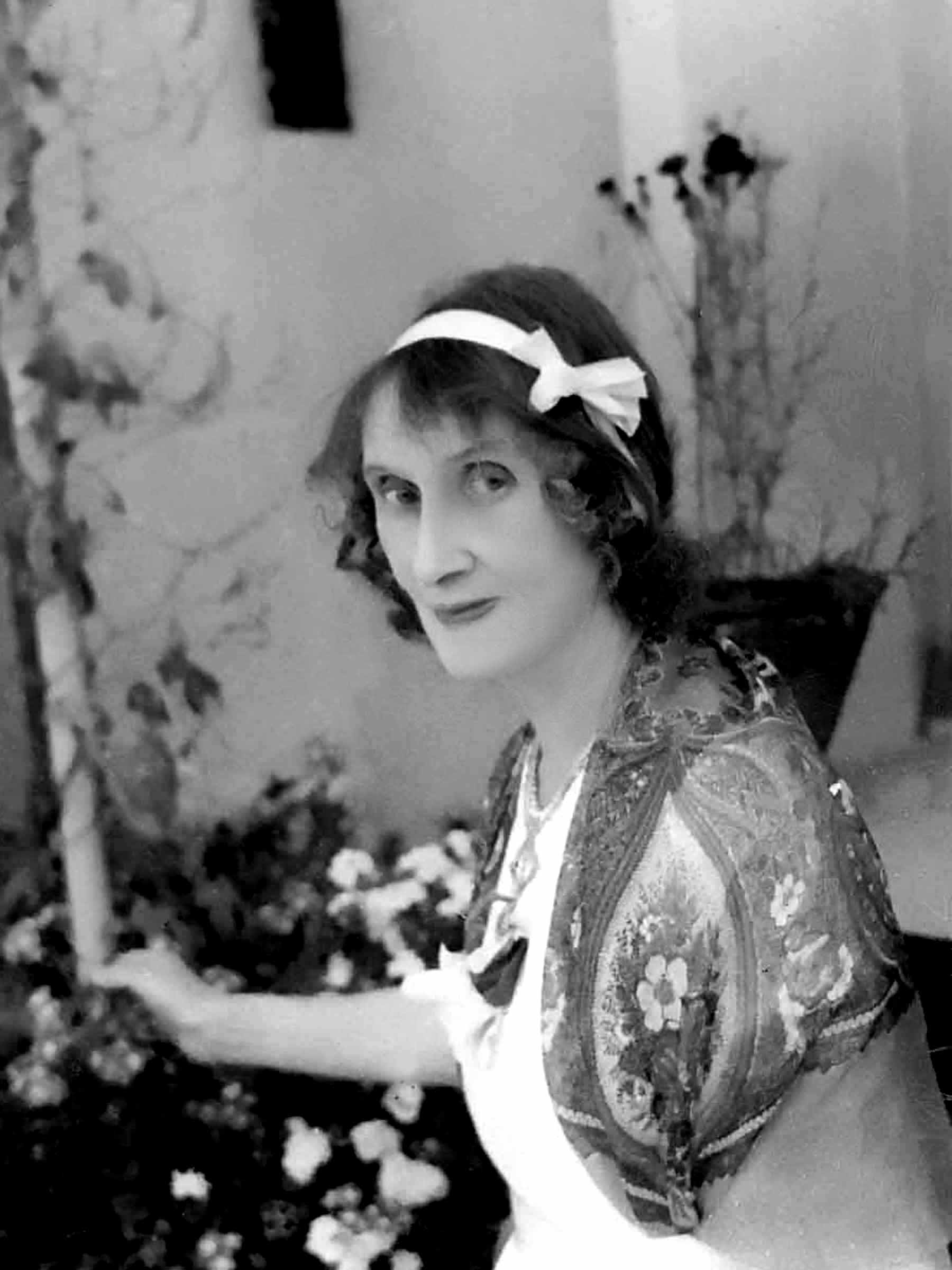
- Elsa Kazi in later years
- Born: Gertrude Loesch; 3 October 1884; Rudolstadt, Schwarzburg-Rudolstadt, German Empire
- Died: 28 May 1967 (aged 82–83)
- Spouse(s): Allama I.I. Kazi (m. 1910; wid. 1967)

Elsa Kazi (1884–1967), commonly known as "Mother Elsa", particularly in the Sindh province of Pakistan, was a German writer of one-act plays, short stories, novels and history, and a poet. She was a composer and a musician of considerable achievement, involved in virtually every conspicuous branch of fine arts. Her paintings are often seen in many distinguished family homes.

Although not well conversant with the Sindhi language, she managed to develop some of the best translations of selected verses of Shah Abdul Latif into English with the support of her husband, Allama I. I. Kazi. She successfully couched the substance of those verses in a poetical setting which, in musical terms, reflects the original Sindhi metrical structure and expression in which Latif had cast them. Her translation of Shah Abdul Latif's poetry is considered by many to be the best in English. Her works have been the subject of several doctoral theses. She is also famous for her stories for children. Furthermore, the University of Washington Libraries has rated her works "Temptation: a drama of Sind country life in three acts", published in 1942, and "Aeolian: notes of an overstrung lyre", published in 1920, amongst the best South Asian literature that emerged before the Partition of India in 1947.

== Short biography ==
Born Gertrude Loesch in Rudel Stadt, a small village in Germany, in the house of a musician who ultimately migrated to London, she assumed the name of Elsa after marriage. Her father the late Mr. Elderman was a prosperous German having property in London that was destroyed during World War II. After the war, compensation was paid to her for the same.

In London, she met the philosopher from Sindh, British India Allama I. I. Kazi by chance. Mr. Kazi, having arrived at the railway station when the train had started moving, managed to board the last compartment which was nearly empty: a solitary young lady occupied a corner quarter. Reared in traditional family background, Mr. Kazi felt very shy and embarrassed and kept standing near the door with his back to her. Elsa was amazed, astonished, and amused to meet a man who would not take a seat despite her repeated offers, and would only repeat apologies. She sought his address and developed a lifelong association. The couple was married in Germany in 1910.

The couple lived in London from 1911 to 1919, and occasionally made short visits to Sindh. Altogether, the couple spent 30 years of life in England, during which they remained engaged in research, tracing the evolution of religion through the ages up to the advent of Islam. Both of them contributed essays, articles, and addresses in vital branches of modern knowledge, besides preaching Islam under the aegis of Jamiatul Muslimeen. In 1919, the couple returned to Sindh, and Allama Kazi first entered the judiciary as Chief Justice of Khairpur State. Owing to differences with His Highness Mir Ali Nawaz of Khairpur, in addition to his dissatisfaction with the British policy towards the States, he resigned after a two-year stay, and the couple left for London.

The couple continued to propagate Islam in London till April 1951, when Allama Kazi accepted the office of Vice-Chancellor of the University of Sindh. He resigned from this office after eight years, and thereafter the couple led a retired life at Hyderabad, Sindh at the residence of Ahmed Mohammad Kazi, an advocate of the Supreme Court of Pakistan and Principal of the Sindh Law College.

In 1967, Elsa was suddenly taken seriously ill with a renal problem and died at the age of 83. She had no children of her own, but the university students and residents of Sindh call her Mother Elsa. Furthermore, several girls' hostels and other buildings in the university district of Jamshoro created at the instance of her husband, are named after her. She lies buried along with Allama I. I. Kazi in the New Campus of Sindh University in Jamshoro, Hyderabad.

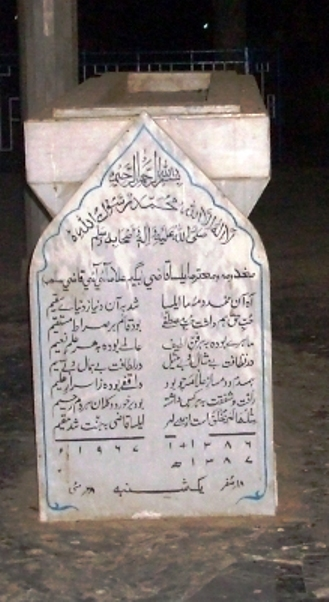
The tombstone of Mother Elsa Kazi

== Her work ==
She saw a green and shadowy tree in Sindh, and she inquired its name and wrote a poem The Neem Tree on it. She helped her husband in writing a book The Brown Girl in Search of God.

== See also ==
- Allama I. I. Kazi
- Dr Ali Ahmed S Kazi
- A G N Kazi
- Justice Mushtak Ali Kazi
- Ahmed Hussain A. Kazi
- Justice Bashir Ghulam Nabi Kazi
- Mutawakkil Kazi
- Sindh
- Paat
- Nabi Bux Khan Baloch
- Dr. Umar Bin Muhammad Daudpota
- Mirza Qalich Baig
- Hassam-ud-Din Rashidi
- Muhammad Ibrahim Joyo
- University of Sindh
