= Nilofer Qureshi =

Women American scientist

- Born: July 31, 1947 (age 78); Karachi, Sindh, Pakistan
- Education: University of Wisconsin–Madison (Ph.D., 1975)
- Occupations: Scientist, Professor
- Known for: Lipopolysaccharides; Proteasomes; Mycolic acids; Cholesterol
- Father: Ahmed Hussain A. Kazi
- Awards: Outstanding Research Achievement Award (Nowotny Award) International Endotoxin and Innate Immunity Society
- Scientific career
- Fields: Chemistry, Immunology, Biomedical Sciences
- Institutions: University of Missouri–Kansas City School of Medicine, University of Wisconsin–Madison College of Agricultural and Life Sciences, William S. Middleton Memorial Veterans Hospital (Madison, WI)

Nilofer Qureshi (/ˈniːloʊfər kəˈreɪʃi/; born July 31, 1947) is a Pakistani-American scientist and professor specializing in biochemistry, immunology, and biomedical sciences. Known for her research on lipopolysaccharides (LPS), proteasomes, and inflammatory diseases, Dr. Qureshi has contributed significantly to the understanding of septic shock, cancer, and other conditions linked to inflammatory processes. With over 50 years of continuous funding from the National Institutes of Health (NIH), she has published more than 180 peer-reviewed articles and holds a professor emeritus position at the University of Missouri–Kansas City School of Medicine.

== Early life and education ==
Nilofer Qureshi was born on July 31, 1947, in Karachi, Sindh, Pakistan, the daughter of Ahmed Hussain A. Kazi, a civil servant and economist, and Ayesha Kazi. Her paternal grandfather, Ali Ahmed S Kazi, was a physician and director of health sciences, instrumental in establishing Liaquat University of Medical & Health Sciences. Her maternal grandfather, Ghulam Nabi Kazi, was the first Director of Public Instruction in Sindh, Pakistan, and played a key role in the region's educational development. Inspired by her family's legacy in academia and medicine, Nilofer Qureshi aspired to become a scientist from an early age.

She earned her Bachelor of Science in Microbiology and Chemistry from Saint Joseph's College for Women, Karachi, followed by a Master of Science degree in Chemistry from Karachi University in 1969. She pursued doctoral studies at the University of Wisconsin–Madison, where she obtained a Ph.D. in Physiological Chemistry in 1975. Her doctoral research focused on the biosynthesis of cholesterol, specifically the purification and mechanisms of HMG-CoA reductase, a groundbreaking study at the time.

== Early career ==
After earning her Ph.D., Qureshi briefly returned to Pakistan to work as a Senior Operations Research Engineer at Sui Southern Gas Company. She soon returned to Madison, Wisconsin, for postdoctoral research at the William S. Middleton Memorial Veterans Hospital, where she studied the structures and purification of mycolic acids from Mycobacterium tuberculosis.

== Research ==
In the late 1970s, Qureshi joined the William S. Middleton Memorial VA Hospital (Veterans Health Administration) full-time as a Research Biochemist, focusing on the mechanisms of bacterial toxins and their role in diseases. She pioneered work on the structure of endotoxins from Salmonella and other bacteria, successfully characterizing lipid A components using novel purification techniques and mass spectrometry. Her work on monophosphoryl lipid A laid the foundation for its use as a vaccine adjuvant, a FDA approved adjuvant.

=== Academic ===
In 1993, Qureshi became an Associate Professor at the University of Wisconsin–Madison, where she taught courses on High-Performance Liquid Chromatography (HPLC) and host-parasite relationships. She also mentored graduate students and postdoctoral fellows. In 2001, Dr. Qureshi was appointed Associate Professor of Basic Medical Sciences, and Director of Molecular and Cellular Immunology at University of Missouri–Kansas City School of Medicine. Five years later, she became a tenured professor, and later took on the role of Director of the Shock/Trauma Research Center. During her tenure, she expanded her research on sepsis, proteasomes, and inflammatory diseases.

=== Biochemistry research ===
Qureshi's research has focused on the biology of lipopolysaccharides (LPS), proteasomes, and their role in inflammatory processes. Her major contributions include:

- Establishing the complete structure of the lipid A moiety of LPS from enterobacterial sources.
- Developing monophosphoryl lipid A as an effective vaccine adjuvant.
- Characterizing LPS antagonists, such as Rhodobacter sphaeroides diphosphoryl lipid A, which inhibits endotoxin activity.
- Investigating the ubiquitin-proteasome pathway in macrophages and its implications for septic shock, diabetes, cancer, and cardiovascular diseases.

Her studies have led to novel therapeutic approaches, including proteasome inhibitors/activators for inflammatory diseases.

Over her 50-year career, Dr. Qureshi studied inflammatory diseases, proteasomes, and septic shock mechanisms. Her 200+ publications, and a collaborative network of over 40 scientists globally, highlight her influence in biomedical research. Her contributions to biochemistry and immunology have impacted the fields of vaccine development, inflammatory diseases, and translational medicine.

== Publications ==
Qureshi has authored over 200 scientific publications and book chapters. Some of her works include:

1. "Reprogramming of Gene Expression of Key Inflammatory Signaling Pathways in Human Peripheral Blood Mononuclear Cells by Soybean Lectin and Resveratrol" (International Journal of Molecular Sciences, 2022).
2. "The Proteasome as a Lipopolysaccharide-Binding Protein in Macrophages" (The Journal of Immunology, 2003).
3. "Toll-like Receptor 4 Imparts Ligand-Specific Recognition of Bacterial Lipopolysaccharide" (The Journal of Clinical Investigation, 2000).
4. "Position of Ester Groups in the Lipid A Backbone of Lipopolysaccharides from Salmonella typhimurium" (Journal of Biological Chemistry, 1983).

== Honors and awards ==
Qureshi's work has earned her numerous accolades, including:

- Outstanding Research Achievement Award (Nowotny Award), International Endotoxin and Innate Immunity Society (2021).
- Lifetime Achievement Award, APPNA (2019).
- Certificate of Achievement Keynote Address, Glycobiology and Glycoproteomics (2018).

== Personal life ==
Qureshi is married to Asaf Qureshi, a fellow scientist and professor specializing in cholesterol and tocotrienols, holding a Ph.D. from the University of Manchester. After their marriage, the couple migrated to the United States from Pakistan, where Qureshi pursued her Ph.D. at the University of Wisconsin–Madison, and Asaf Qureshi continued his postdoctoral research. They have one son. The couple has co-authored multiple publications and currently resides in both Dallas, Texas, and Kansas City, Missouri.
