= Aftab Ghulam Nabi Kazi =

Pakistani civil servant (1919–2016)

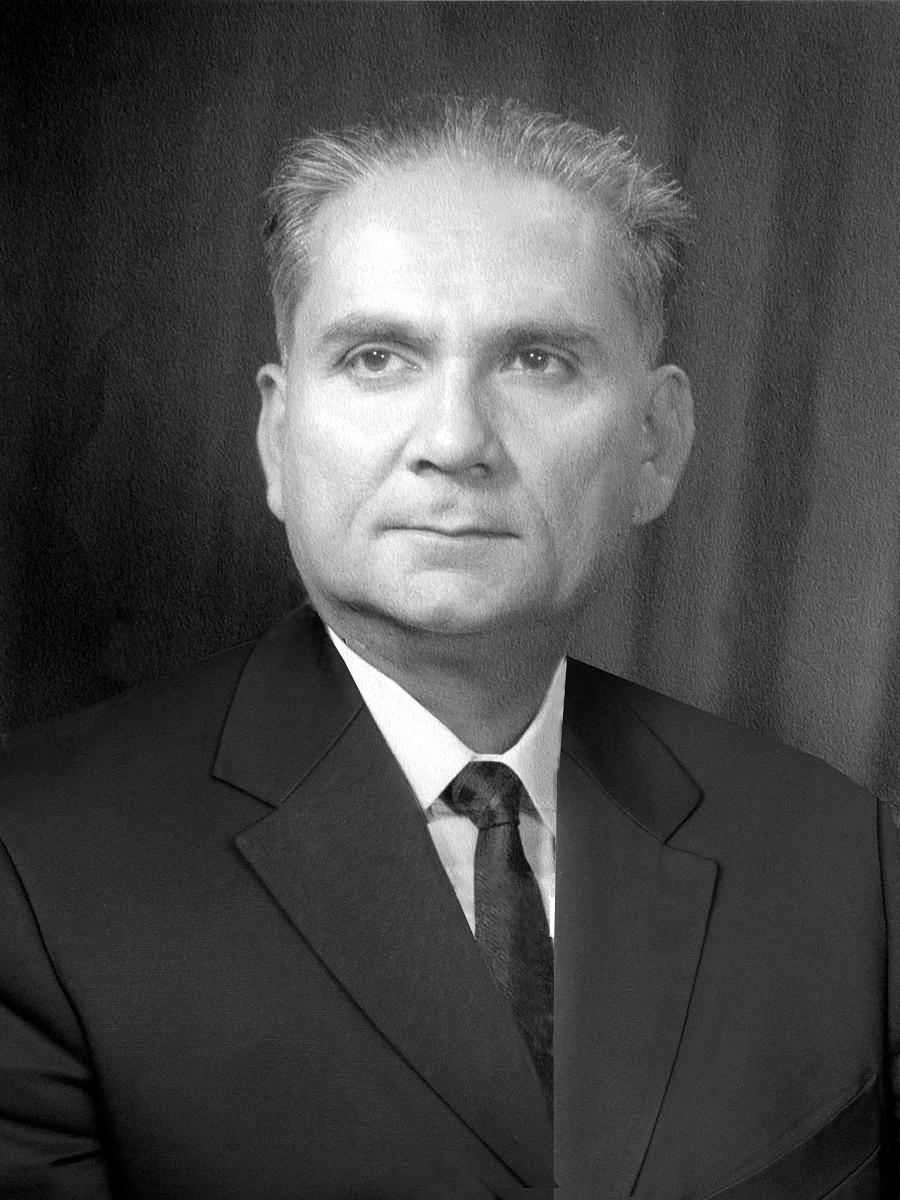
- Aftab Ghulam Nabi Kazi in Washington D.C., United States, circa 1960.

Chairman of Pakistan Board of Investment
- In office 19 October 1993 – 15 November 1994
- President: Farooq Leghari
- Prime Minister: Benazir Bhutto

12th Deputy chairman of the Planning Commission (Pakistan)
- In office 7 October 1986 – 23 August 1993
- President: General Zia-ul-Haq; Ghulam Ishaq Khan
- Prime Minister: Muhammad Khan Junejo; Benazir Bhutto; Ghulam Mustafa Jatoi; Nawaz Sharif
- Preceded by: V.A. Jafary
- Succeeded by: Saeed Ahmed Quresh

8th Governor of the State Bank of Pakistan
- In office 15 July 1978 – 9 July 1986
- President: General Zia-ul-Haq
- Preceded by: S. Osman Ali
- Succeeded by: Vasim Aon Jafarey

Chairman of the Federal Board of Revenue (Pakistan)
- In office 8 September 1970 – 20 August 1973
- President: Fazal Ilahi Chaudhry; Zulfikar Ali Bhutto
- Prime Minister: Zulfikar Ali Bhutto

9th Finance Secretary of Pakistan
- In office 8 September 1970 – 20 August 1973
- President: Fazal Ilahi Chaudhry; Zulfikar Ali Bhutto
- Prime Minister: Zulfikar Ali Bhutto

Personal details
- Born: Aftab Ahmad Ghulam Nabi Kazi; 6 November 1919 Sindh, British India
- Died: 9 August 2016 (aged 96) Islamabad, Pakistan
- Citizenship: Pakistan
- Spouse: Zakia Nabi Kazi
- Education: University of Bombay
- Occupation: Teacher, civil servant
- Notable awards: Star of Pakistan (1966); Star of Service (1969)

Aftab Ghulam Nabi Kazi (Urdu: آفتاب غلام نبی قاضی; 6 November 1919 – 9 August 2016) SPk, SK, also known as AGN Kazi, was a Pakistani civil servant and a bureaucrat during the Cold War and the post-Cold War era. Kazi was born in Sindh, Bombay Presidency, in 1919 to an academic family. He started his career in the Indian Civil Service in 1944 and served as the Deputy Commissioner of Bihar and Orissa. After the partition of India, Kazi migrated to Pakistan and joined the Provincial Government of Sindh, and held positions such as Secretary of Finance and Secretary to the Governor of Sindh.

During the early 1960s, Kazi was Economic Minister in the Pakistan Embassy to the USA. After a brief stint as Additional Chief Secretary of West Pakistan, he was appointed Chairman of the Water and Power Development Authority. In that role, he was responsible for the completion of the Mangla Dam project. In March 1969, he was appointed Secretary for Industries and Natural Resources and then a year later he became Finance Secretary, a post he held for over three years until his elevation as secretary general.

After the power struggle triggered by General Yahya Khan's general election, Zulfikar Bhutto became the new leader of Pakistan. In 1973, Kazi became Secretary General Finance and Economic Coordination. When Ghulam Ishaq Khan became Finance Minister, Kazi was appointed Economic Advisor to the President in July 1977. In 1978, Kazi was appointed Governor of State Bank of Pakistan until 1986. The Pakistan State Bank, under Kazi, was characterised by excellent financial discipline in the banking sector coupled with good relations with the Federal Government.

Kazi was the longest-serving civil servant in the history of Pakistan. As a leading civil servant, Kazi passed through several major events in the history of Pakistan, including the removal of Bhutto and the mysterious death of General Zia-ul-Haq. In 1993, he was appointed the chairman Privatization Commission and was again given the status of a Federal Minister as Chief Executive of the Pakistan Investment Board. In 1994, Kazi retired from office, at the age of 75, and led a quiet retired life in Islamabad. He died on 9 August 2016 after a prolonged illness.

== Early life ==
Kazi was born into a Sindhi, working-class family consisting of his father Khan Bahadur Ghulam Nabi Kazi, an educationist, and his sibling Bashir Ghulam Nabi Kazi would later go on to become a senior Judge at the Sindh High Court and later the Federal Shariat Court. The family originated from Sindh, Bombay Presidency, British India. His father was a veteran educationist of Sindh who had been awarded the MBE by the British Government for his services to humanity and social development. Anybody who suggests that a Khan Bahadur and an MBE was a member of the middle class during British colonial rule of India is being modest. His family was a member of Indian aristocracy. On the separation of Sindh from Bombay, Khan Bahadur Ghulam Nabi Kazi was appointed the first Director of Public Instructions Sindh in 1936. Kazi received his education in Jamshoro, Sindh, and went on to attend the Cathedral and John Connon School in 1930.

After graduating from school, Kazi attended the University of Bombay from 1937. He graduated with a BS in statistics in 1941, and later went on to gain MSc in physics and Master of Arts in mathematics from the University of Bombay. In 1943, he sat the last-ever Indian Civil Service examinations from there, becoming a member of the final cadre of the ICS.

== Senior offices held ==
After the amalgamation of all provinces in the western wing of the country in 1955, Kazi was appointed Finance Secretary of West Pakistan. In the early 1960s he was posted as Economic Minister in the Pakistan Embassy in Washington DC USA where he served until 1965. On his return to Pakistan, he was appointed for a brief period as Additional Chief Secretary (Planning nd Development) West Pakistan and thereafter as Chairman of Pakistan's Water and Power Development Authority (WAPDA). It was during his tenure as chairman WAPDA that the Mangla Dam was inaugurated and on this occasion he was awarded the high civil award of Sitara-e-Pakistan. Previously he had also been awarded the Sitara-e-Khidmat. In 1969, he was appointed Secretary for Industries and Natural Resources and a year later as Finance Secretary to the Government of Pakistan. He held this office during the crisis of 1971. In this capacity, he was also Chairman of the Federal Board of Revenue. In 1973, Kazi was assigned the highest grade in the civil service and made Secretary General, Finance and Economic Coordination in which capacity he had to supervise the working of all the economic and planning ministries of the government. He was appointed Advisor to the President on Economic Affairs in 1977 with the rank of a full Cabinet Minister on the imposition of martial law in July 1977. Thereafter he was appointed Governor of State Bank of Pakistan in 1978. He served there for eight years and this period was characterised by excellent financial discipline in the banking sector coupled with good relations with the federal government. During his tenure as Secretary General Finance, Kazi became involved in securing Pakistan's nuclear capability, along with Agha Shahi and Ghulam Ishaq Khan; the three constituting the co-ordination board to monitor the nuclear program. In 1986, he was appointed Deputy chairman Planning Commission, in which position he remained until 1993 until his induction as the chairman Privatisation Commission. In 1993 he was again given the status of a Federal Minister as chairman/Chief Executive of the Pakistan Investment Board.

== Offices held ==
Political offices
Preceded by Ghulam Ishaq Khan	Finance Secretary of Pakistan; 1970–1973	Succeeded by Abdur Rauf Shaikh
Preceded by S. Osman Ali	Governor of the State Bank of Pakistan; 1978–1986	Succeeded by V.A. Jafarey
Preceded by V. A. Jafarey	Deputy Chairman Planning Commission; 1986–1993	Succeeded by Saeed Ahmed Qureshi

== See also ==
- Allama I. I. Kazi
- Elsa Kazi
- Dr Ali Ahmed S Kazi
- Ahmed Hussain A. Kazi
- Roedad Khan
- Rizwan Ahmed
- Shaikh Nazrul Bakar
- Mushtak Ali Kazi
- Mutawakkil Kazi
