= Shaikh Nazrul Bakar =

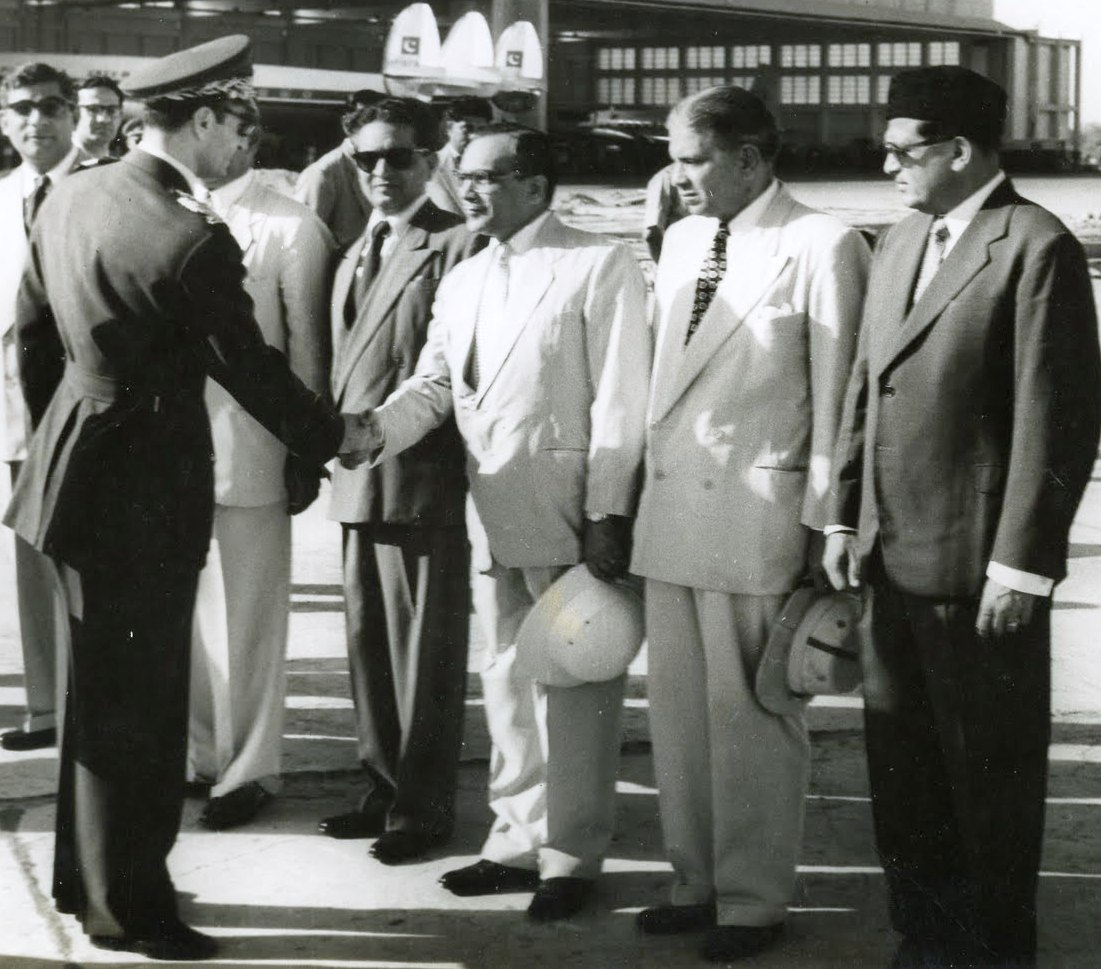
- Bakar receiving the Shah of Iran at Karachi Airport in 1958

Personal details
- Born: 21 December 1913 Wazirabad, Punjab, British India
- Died: 26 November 1966 (aged 52)
- Cause of death: Heart attack
- Spouse: Sultana Ali
- Children: 5
- Parent: Shaikh Abdul Majid (father)
- Education: Punjab University

Shaikh Nazrul Bakar (21 December 1913 – 26 September 1966), also known as S. N. Bakar, was a prominent civil servant of British India and later Pakistan.

== Education ==
He completed his schooling from St. Denny's High School in Murree and went on to graduate with honours from Punjab University in 1934. Subsequently, he secured a master's degree from Oxford University.

== Career ==
Bakar joined the elite Indian Civil Service in 1935 and was initially posted in several major cities of Bengal including Dacca and Calcutta. On the Partition of India in 1947, he opted for Pakistan and continued to serve in East Bengal as principal secretary to the chief minister. He later served as Deputy Secretary Interior in the Central government from 1949 to 1952 and officiated as Interior Secretary during the crucial period of the Rawalpindi conspiracy case. He remained Director General Civil Defence from 1952 to 1955 during which period he received in-service training in England for one year. Subsequently, he reverted to Dhaka and was assigned the civil supplies department, before being posted to Lahore. Bakar was assigned the pivotal position of Director General Civil Aviation in the Central government in 1957 during which period he took several strategic decisions to improve the position of the airports and airlines in the relatively new country. He was retired from service in 1959 owing to long standing animosity with fellow civil servant Aziz Ahmed who emerged as Deputy Chief Martial Law Administrator under President Ayub Khan following the imposition of martial law in October 1958. After his retirement, Bakar reverted to his family business.

== Death ==
S N Bakar died at the relatively young age of 53 years in 1966 due to cardiac arrest, leaving behind his widow Sultana, whose father, Khan Bahadur Syed Ijaz Ali OBE, was Regent of Khairpur State, five children, Riaz, Niaz, Rumana, Farzana and Shahbaz. His wife was the sister of the late Zakia Kazi, who was married to another ICS officer Aftab Ghulam Nabi Kazi. Bakar was also closely related to a former Chief Justice of Pakistan Mr Justice S. A. Rahman, who was incidentally also an Indian Civil Service officer.

== See also ==
- Civil Aviation Authority
- A G N Kazi
- S. A. Rahman
- Rawalpindi conspiracy
