= Cholistan Canal Project =

Controversy on Canal Projects from Indus river

Cholistan Canal Project is a controversial project under-construction on the Indus River under Pakistan’s Green Pakistan Initiative since early 2025.

== History ==
In March 2025, the Government of Punjab, Pakistan launched the Green Pakistan Initiative in Cholistan, Punjab jointly by General Asim Munir and Punjab Chief Minister Maryam Nawaz Sharif under corporate farming. The project received widespread criticism primarily by people of Sindh province and environmental experts as the project is expected to severely affect the life of people and Indus Delta. As per the project six canals will be constructed from Indus River to irrigate 4.8 million acres (1.94 million hectares) of “barren wasteland” identified across the country. Project has been protested against on varioius platforms by farmers and nationalists, civil society, lawyers, members of provincial and federal assembly and others in Sindh. Provincial Assembly of Sindh passed a resolution against the initiative on 13 March 2025. Pakistan Tahrik-e-Insaf submitted a resolution against the construction of new canals in National Assembly of Pakistan on 10 April.

== Background ==
The Indus River is Pakistan’s most vital freshwater resource, supporting agriculture, domestic consumption, industries and livelihoods for millions. It is governed by both the Indus Waters Treaty (1960) between India and Pakistan and the Water Apportionment Accord (1991), which regulates water sharing among the provinces of Punjab, Sindh, Balochistan, and Khyber Pakhtunkhwa. It flows from Tibet through the territories of India and Pakistan, eventually emptying into the Arabian Sea. Governed by the Indus Waters Treaty (1960) between India and Pakistan, and domestically by the Water Apportionment Accord (1991) between the Provinces of Pakistan, the management of the river's resources remains a highly sensitive issue.

== Criticism and Opposition ==
The project has been met with strong resistance in Sindh, where civil society groups, environmentalists, political leaders, and local farmers have raised multiple concerns. Several stakeholders in Sindh allege that they were not adequately consulted prior to the launch of the project, fueling perceptions of unilateral decision-making by the federal government and Punjab authorities. Opponents contend that any major alteration to the river system must be approved through consensus among all provinces, as stipulated in the 1991 Accord. The Green Pakistan Initiative (GPI) involves building six canals—five from the Indus River—to irrigate barren lands. Critics argue it reflects Milbus (military business), as the military is heavily involved and may benefit economically.

== Political developments ==
On 13 March 2025, the Sindh Provincial Assembly unanimously passed a resolution rejecting the canal project and urging the federal government to halt construction. Following this, members of the Pakistan Tehreek-e-Insaf (PTI) and other opposition parties submitted similar resolutions in the National Assembly, calling for a comprehensive environmental and legal review.

Various public demonstrations and rallies have been held across Sindh under the banners of regional parties and civil society coalitions, including the Sindh United Party, Jeay Sindh Mahaz, and Awami Workers Party.

=== Lawyers’ Sit-in at Babarloi ===
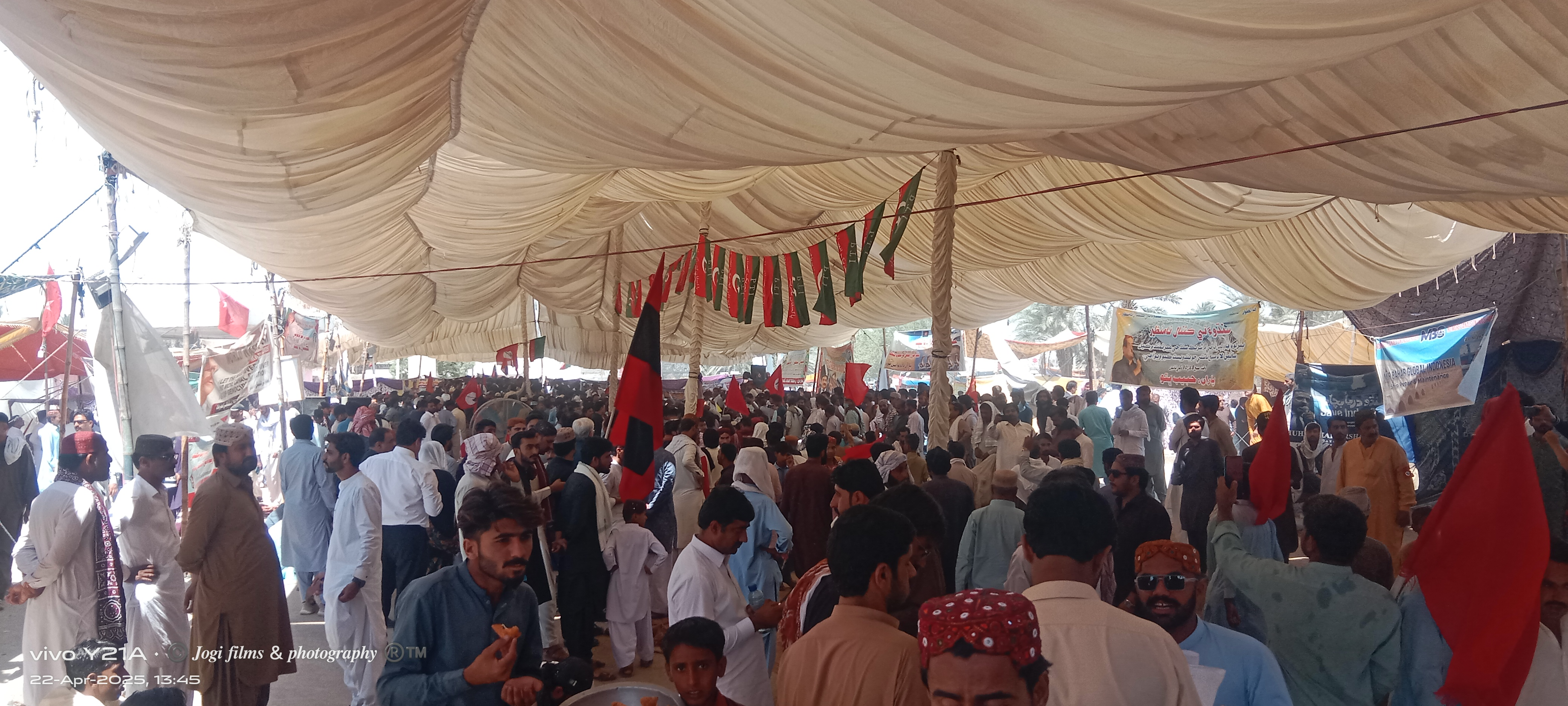
Sit in at Babarloi against Green Pakistan initiative

As part of the broader protest movement against the controversial canals project, lawyers in the town of Babarloi, Sindh, organized a peaceful sit-in demonstration to express solidarity with the people affected by potential water shortages. The protest, led by members of the local bar association, called for the immediate suspension of canal construction until an inclusive and transparent dialogue could be held between all stakeholders. The lawyers emphasized that the project posed a threat to Sindh’s legal and constitutional water rights under the Water Apportionment Accord of 1991.

=== Government position ===
The federal government and the Punjab provincial administration have remained stubborn in their decision to the construction of the six new canals, despite strong opposition from the people of Sindh.

== See also ==
- Nara Canal system in Sindh
