= Casual Peeps at Sophia =

1967 collection of works by Allama I I Kazi

- Author: Allama Imdad Ali Imam Ali Kazi
- Original title: Casual peeps at Sophia
- Language: English
- Subject: Philosophy, Religion, Art, History, Poetry
- Genre: Prose
- Publisher: Sindhi Adabi Board
- Publication date: 1967
- Publication place: Sindh, Pakistan
- Pages: 194

Casual Peeps at Sophia is a collection of essays and addresses by Allama I I Kazi. It was published by the Sindhi Adabi Board in 1967. The subjects dealt within these essays and addresses cover a wide range of topics such as philosophy, religion, history, poetry, art and literary criticism.
