= Ali Ahmed S Kazi =

Pakistani physician (1896–1970)

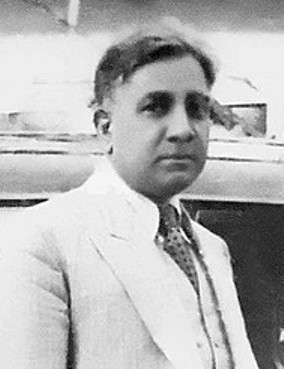
Ali Ahmed S Kazi as Medical Superintendent Civil Hospital Karachi

Ali Ahmed S Kazi (1896–1970) was one of the few physicians in Sindh when it was created as a province in British India in 1936.

== Family ==
He was born in 1896 and was a nephew of the great intellectual Allama I. I. Kazi and his illustrious wife Elsa Kazi. His father, Sharafuddin Kazi died when he was still quite young.

== Career ==
Kazi played a pioneering role initially in creating the Liaquat Medical College, now the Liaquat University of Medical and Health Sciences, from the existing medical school at Hyderabad. Subsequently, he directed his attention to the strengthening and consolidation of the Dow Medical College at Karachi. He was appointed as the first Medical Superintendent of Civil Hospital Karachi in 1949. Subsequently, in 1952, he was appointed Director [presently Director General] Health Services for the Sindh province. He retired from service in 1955.

== Death ==
Kazi died in 1970, leaving behind his widow Ayesha, a son - the late Ahmed Hussain A Kazi - a civil servant who was a Secretary to the Government of Pakistan from 1974 to 1979, and three grandchildren: Nilofer Qureshi, Safdar Kazi and Ghulam Nabi Kazi.

== See also ==
- Khan Bahadur Ghulam Nabi Kazi
- Ahmed Hussain A. Kazi
- Justice Mushtak Ali Kazi
- Justice Bashir Ghulam Nabi Kazi
- Mutawakkil Kazi
- Civil Hospital Karachi
