= Paat =

Paat Pat
- Deh
- Location in Sindh Paat (Pakistan)
- Coordinates: 26.959159°N 67.875961°E
- Country: Pakistan
- Region: Sindh
- District: Dadu
- Taluka: Dadu

Population (2017)
  - Total: 9,507
- Time zone: UTC+5 (PST)
  - Summer (DST): UTC+6 (PDT)

Paat (Sindhi: پاٹ, romanized: Pāṭ), also known as Pat or Goth Pat, is a small town in the Dadu District of Sindh, Pakistan. It is located at 20°28'0N 48°68'0E with an altitude of 25 metres (82 ft). As of 2017, it has a population of 9,507, in 1,707 households. It is the seat of a tapa.

Pat is on the right bank of Indus river, known as cultural educational and commercial hub of midland Sindh.

Paat Sharif lies between the west bank of the Indus River and the Dadu Canal. Its climate has been recorded as one of the hottest places in the world, with temperatures reaching 53.5 °C (128.3 °F) on 26 May 2010. The town is surrounded by fertile agriculture land, which is irrigated by water from the Dadu canal. The local people have limited access to potable drinking water. The farming of livestock is common in Dadu, especially in Kachho, an area largely inaccessible due to the lack of a good road infrastructure. Paat, has a mainline railway station named Piyaro Goth.

The old site of Pat, called Pat Kuhna ("old Pat"), is located just to the east of the modern town. Between the two, there is (or was) an old channel that is believed to represent a former course of the Indus, so that Pat lay on the river's east bank whereas now it is northwest of the river. This course was active at the time of Humayun's visit in 1541, so that his route to Pat from Babarlo never involved crossing the river.

Old Pat was destroyed by Madad Khan during his campaign in 1798.

== History ==
Paat is close to Sehwan. A mound known as Lohum Jo Daro near the Piyaro Goth railway station was first discovered in 1925, and subsequently excavated by the archaeologist Majumdar. He recovered several objects typical of Indus culture along with pottery from the Mohenjo Daro period. There is evidence that the conditions in Baluchistan and Sindh five thousand years ago were more favourable for human habitation than they are today.

There are various views about the origin of the town and the popular one is that it was initially called 'Patar' after the maharaja who built it. Patar in Persian means the crown. Hence, it is envisaged that either it was important to the crown or else it is so named after its shape being like a crown. In 1785 the river changed its course and the town had to shift on the other bank leaving 'old paat' and constructing 'new paat'.

Lal Shahbaz Qalander of Sehwan (1177–1274) visited Paat between 1196 and 1224 and met a Sufi nobleman there named Pir Haji Ismail. The two contemporaries became friends and often met to exchange ideas on religious preaching, tolerance, and cohesion among their communities. A shrine to Pir Haji Ismail was subsequently built in Paat, and is still regularly visited today. In view of the links with Lal Shahbaz Qalandar and the services rendered by the locals to the spread of the Sufism and religion, it was bestowed the title of 'Paat Shareef' to honour the town.

During Sama dynasty Shaikh Tahar and shahar Ramadhan, from the family of Shaikh Shahabuddin Saharwardi of Baghdad, migrated to Sindh on the invitation of Sindh's celebrated King Jam Nizamuddin (also known as Jam Nandho). Jam Nizamuddin welcome them they settled in Patt notified the village as Qabilaul Islam Patt Sharif in their respect. Allama Imdad Ali Imam Ali Kazi belonged to this village.

In the sixteenth century, the Mughal Emperor Humayun fled to Sindh after his defeat by Sher Shah Suri. He met and fell in love with Hamida Banu Begum, daughter of Shaikh Ali Akbar Jami, a Persian Shia and a friend and preceptor to Hindal Mirza, the youngest son of first Mughal Emperor and Humayun's father Babur, and married her at Paat in 1541. She gave birth to Akbar, who went on to become the next Emperor. Later, about 1545, the wedding of Humayun's brother Kamran, who married the daughter of emperor of Sindh, Shah Arghun, was held in Paat.

Pat is the Pātar (the variant spelling Bātar is also encountered) listed in the Ain-i-Akbari as a mahal in the sarkar of Sehwan. With an assessed revenue of 2,020,884 dams for the imperial treasury, Patar was the single most productive mahal in the sarkar and presumably covered a large and fertile territory.

Later, Pat became part of the pargana of Kakar.

Hyder Kaloach well known as Hyder Harvi came during Arghun period from Hirat to Sindh and settled in Pat. His collection of poetry is Qasaid Hyder Kaloach if popular.

In 1915, the reformist educationalist Kazi Ahmadi established, with the help of the British government, a co-educational Model School in Paat, which now bears his name. Education of girls in Sindh was a bold step in those days, and met with a lot of opposition. The school has since been completely rebuilt by the government of Sindh, who have managed it since Pakistan's independence.

The 1951 census recorded the village of Pat as having an estimated population of about 3,500, in about 590 houses. It had a primary school, a middle school, and a Sanitary Committee at that point.

In August 2016, the local religious leader Makhdoom Iftikharul Haq was shot and killed by a group of seven armed men on motorcycles in the Shahi Bazaar area while on his way to the Fazl-i-Ilahi shrine, which he was the custodian of. After the Makhdoom's death, the entire town of Pat was virtually shut down as thousands of mourners flocked to the Dadu Civil Hospital.

== Current status ==
Most of the original residents belonging to the Sayed, Ansari, Junejo, Memon, Siddiqui, Kazi, Bhatti, Soomro, Mangi, Palh and Channa families have settled in Karachi, and those remaining in Paat suffer under poor economic conditions and low living standards.
