= Shams Abbasi =

Pakistani academic and writer (1924–2011)

Aapa Shams Abbasi
- آپا شمس عباسي
- Born: 10 January 1924; Sehwan, Sindh, British India
- Died: 16 March 2011 (aged 87); Hyderabad, Sindh
- Citizenship: Pakistani
- Occupations: Educator, academic leader, teacher
- Writing career
- Period: 1924 - 2011

Shams Abbasi (Sindhi: شمس عباسي; 10 January 1924 -16 March 2011), popularly known as Apa Shams Abbasi, was a Pakistani educationist, academic leader, scholar, and writer. She authored 22 books both in English and Sindhi and remained committed to the cause of educating girls from poor families. She served as Director of Education and Director of the Bureau of Curriculum. She was president of the Sindh chapter of All Pakistan Women's Association (APWA) and president of Sindhi Aurat Tanzeem (Sindhi Women Association). She was affiliated with a number of literary, educational, and social societies and organizations.

== Childhood and education ==
Shams Abbasi was born on 10 January 1924 at Qazi Muhala Sehwan, Sindh, Pakistan. Her father Qazi Abdul Qayoom, was a journalist and social leader. Her father died when she was only five years old. She passed matriculation and Intermediate examinations in 1939 and 1941 respectively and received a B.A. degree in 1943.

== Career ==
She started her career as a secondary school teacher at Madersat-ul-Banat School Hyderabad. She joined as Head Mistress of Meeran High School in 1948 and first principal of Zubaida College Hyderabad in 1955. She was appointed as Deputy Director Colleges in 1971 and founding director of the Bureau of Curriculum in 1974. She retired from service in 1984. Despite her job and administrative responsibilities, she did Ph.D. on the literary and political contributions of Hakeem Fateh Muhammad Sehwani, who was her uncle and father in law.

== Social, educational and literary activities ==
While Abbasi was serving as director education, she traveled to remote villages in Sindh and convinced the parents and encouraged the teachers to provide education to young girls. She was the first one to take the initiative of appointing female teachers in government schools to motivate girls and their parents towards education. She took this up as a challenge with the belief that this was the only way to bring change in a society dominated by the feudal system. Abbasi was inspired by her mother, who provided education to all of her daughters despite opposition from her family and community.

After the death of her only son Aquil, she established a school in Hyderabad in his memory and named it after him. The Apa Shams Abbasi Library and a spacious auditorium are two of the attractions of the school. Majority of the teachers here are female.

Along with her academic contributions, she took an active part in social activities. She was president of Sindh Chapter of the All Pakistan Women Association, President of Professional and Business Sindh, President of Theosophical Society of Sindh, Vice President of Senior Citizens Club, President of Sindhi Women Association and Chairman of the Muhsin Memorial Educational Society. She visited many countries, including Bangkok, Malaysia, Singapore, England, Philippines, Iran, Turkey, India, China, Belgium, Germany, the USA, Japan, and Italy, etc.

She authored 22 books in Sindhi and English. One of her famous book is Maulana Hakeem Fateh Muhammad Sehwania Ji Shakhsiat (Sindhi: مولانا حڪيم فتح محمد سيوھاڻيءَ جي شخصيت). This book is about the contributions and personality of Hakeem Fateh Muhammad Sehwani.

She received more than 200 awards.

== Death ==
Shams Abbasi died in March 2011.
