= Agha Rafiq Ahmed Khan =

Pakistani Judge of High Court

The Honourable Justice Dr Agha Rafiq Ahmed Khan جسٹس ڈاکٹر اغا رفیق احمد خان
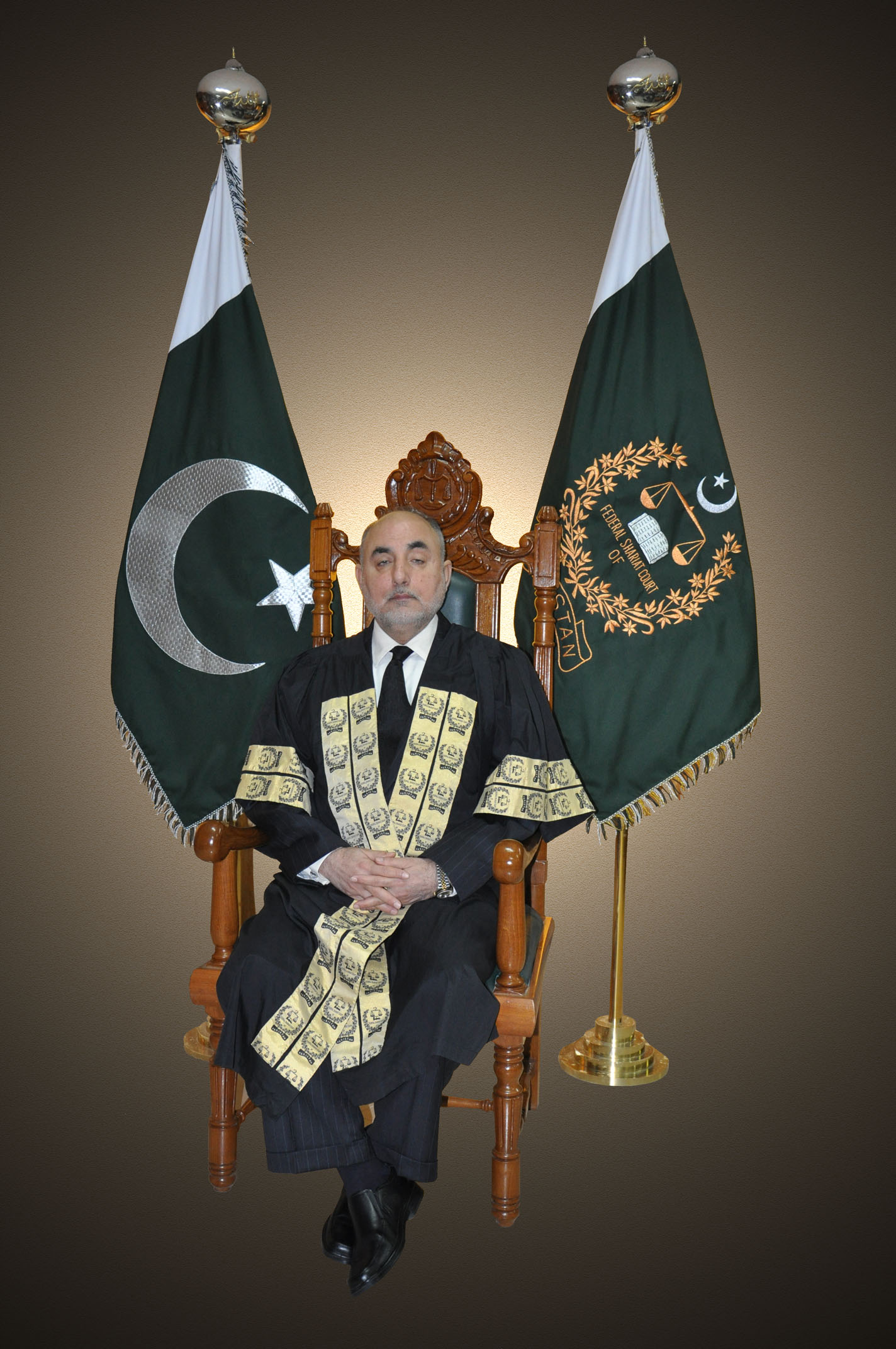

12th Chief Justice of the Federal Shariat Court of Pakistan
- In office 5 June 2009 – 4 June 2014
- Nominated by: Asif Ali Zardari
- Preceded by: Haziq-ul-Khairi
- Succeeded by: Sardar Muhammad Raza Khan

22nd Chairman Sindh Public Service Commission
- In office 9 June 2014 – 15 January 2015
- President: Mamnoon Hussain
- Governor: Ishrat-ul-Ibad Khan
- Preceded by: Irshad Ali Shah
- Succeeded by: Muhammad Saleem Bhonur

Chief Scout Commissioner of Pakistan Pakistan Boy Scouts Association
- In office 19 October 2011 – 12 June 2014
- Nominated by: Asif Ali Zardari
- Succeeded by: Raheela Durrani

Federal Law Secretary of Pakistan
- In office 9 March 2008 – 5 June 2009
- Nominated by: Yousaf Raza Gillani
- Preceded by: Justice Bin Yamin
- Succeeded by: Justice ® Riaz Kiyani

Justice High Court of Sindh
- In office 14 May 1995 – 9 Oct 2009
- Nominated by: Farooq Leghari

Personal details
- Born: 23 August 1949 (age 77) Shikarpur District of Sindh, Pakistan
- Education: University of Sindh; University of London

Agha Rafiq Ahmed Khan (born 23 August 1949) a Pakistani jurist belongs to Garhi Yasin in Shikarpur District of Sindh, Pakistan. He is the son-in-law of Justice Mushtak Ali Kazi, who was a Judge of High Court of Sindh and Balochistan. Justice Agha is a Senior Advocate of the Supreme Court of Pakistan. He served as the 12th Chief Justice of the Federal Shariat Court of Pakistan from 2009 to 2014.

== Early life and family ==
Justice Agha Rafiq Ahmed Khan was born on 23 August 1949 in Shikarpur, Sindh Province, Pakistan. He belongs to the royal Pathan Barakzai family, from Afghanistan and is also related to Ahmad Shah Durrani of Persia. He is the son of Agha Mohammad Anwer Khan, an agriculturist and was educated at D.C. High School in Garhi Yasin. Subsequently, he graduated from the C&S Government College, Shikarpur and also graduated in Law from the University of Sindh in 1971.

He is married to Farzeen Agha, and has four children namely, Agha Haris and Agha Fahad, Hira Agha Shah and Sanaah Agha Shah.

== Legal career ==
Justice Agha was enrolled as a member of the Sindh Bar Council in 1972. He joined Sindh Judicial Services as a civil judge and first class magistrate in 1973 through competitive examination of the Sindh Public Service Commission. He was promoted as senior civil judge and assistant sessions judge in 1978, and subsequently as additional district and sessions judge in 1983. In 1985, he was appointed as Secretary of the Sindh Legislative Assembly. He attended a Shariah training course in the International Islamic University in Islamabad in 1984. He was appointed as director of administration and legal services of Pakistan International Airlines in 1989. Reverting to his judicial career, he was promoted as district and sessions judge in May 1990. He also held the position of additional secretary for regulations in the Services and General Administration Department of the Government of Sindh. He assumed the charge of law secretary to the Government of Sindh in 1994, and was elevated as additional judge of the High Court of Sindh in 1995 and confirmed as a judge of the same court in 1996. However, he reverted to the Sindh Judiciary after a decision in the Al-Jehad Trust case and was posted as district and sessions judge in various districts of Sindh from 1997 to 2007. He was again elevated as additional judge of the Sindh High Court on 14 December 2007. After a few months, he was appointed secretary to the Government of Pakistan, Law and Justice Division in 2008. He was again confirmed as a permanent judge of the Sindh High Court during December 2008, retaining his original seniority from 1995. He was elevated as Chief Justice of the Federal Shariat Court of Pakistan on 5 June 2009.

== Chief Justice of the Federal Shariat Court ==
Justice Agha Rafiq took the oath as the 12th Chief Justice of the Federal Shariat Court on 5 June 2009; President of Pakistan Asif Ali Zardari administered the oath of office at Aiwan-e-Sadr. Prime Minister of Pakistan Yousuf Raza Gillani and Chief Justice of Pakistan Iftikhar Muhammad Chaudhry were also present.

== Appointment as Chairman Sindh Public Service Commission ==
Justice Agha was appointed as Chairman of the Sindh Public Service Commission in June 2014 for a period of five years, however he resigned just six months after he took office due to undue interference of the Government of Sindh. He took strict measures to uphold merit and to eradicate corruption within the institution during his tenure.

== Honors ==
As Justice Agha attended the 2nd Arab Countries Chief Justice Conference in 2011, he had invited the chief justices of Oman, Sudan, Egypt, Jordan, Morocco and Qatar to visit his country. All of them visited Pakistan on his invitation in March, April, and May 2012. In February 2013, Kamal B. A. Dhan, Chief Justice of Libya, visited Pakistan and strengthened the judicial ties between Libya and Pakistan. In June 2013, Justice Sidi Yahefdhou, Chief Justice of Mauritania, also visited Pakistan.

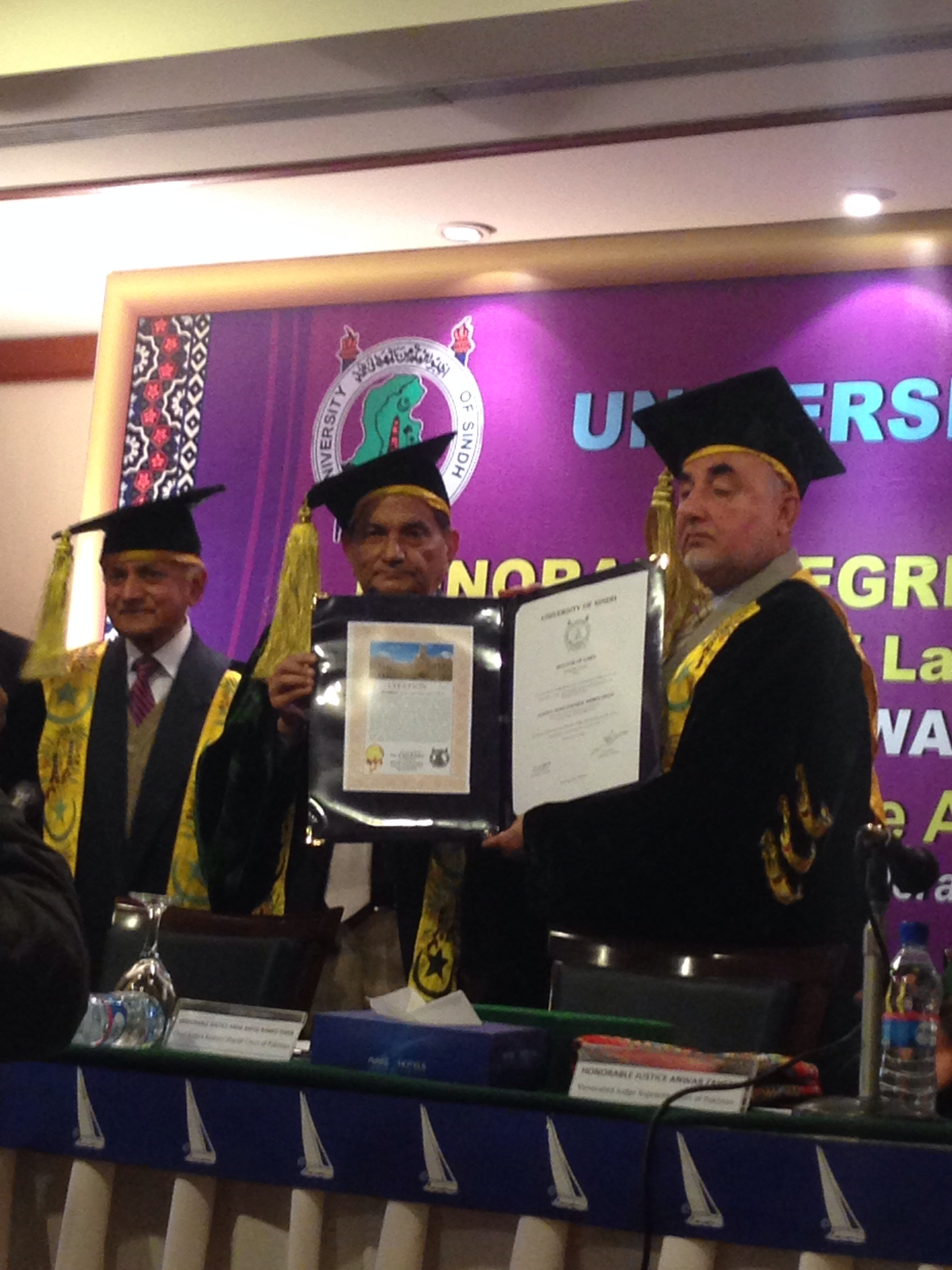
Justice DrAgha Rafiq Ahmed Khan being awarded with the Doctorate of Law Degree by the University of Sindh Vice Chancellor.

Justice Agha was awarded the Honoris Causa Doctorate of Law Degree by the University of Sindh on 26 January 2014 at Karachi. He is the first ever judge in Pakistan to receive the degree.

== Autobiography ==
Justice Agha authored an autobiography detailing his journey from childhood to his retirement from the judiciary, offering insights into his career progression from a civil judge to Chief Justice and documenting key developments in Pakistan's judicial history.

== See also ==
- Justice Mushtak Ali Kazi
- Chief Justice of the Federal Shariat Court
- Federal Law Secretary of Pakistan

Legal offices
Preceded by Haziq-ul-Khairi	Chief Justice of the Federal Shariat Court; 2005–2007	Succeeded by {{{after}}}
