= Mamoon Kazi =

Mamoon Kazi (1938–April 2, 2014) was a Pakistani judge who served as the chief justice of the Sindh High Court from 1996 to 1997 and a justice of the Supreme Court of Pakistan from 1997 until 2000 when he refused to take oath under the military dictator Pervez Musharraf's Provisional Constitutional Order and resigned.

== Early life and education ==
Mamoon Kazi was born into the noble Kazi family. He was a nephew of Sindh High Court justice, Mushtak Ali Kazi. He was educated at the Sindh Muslim Law College.

== Career ==
Kazi was elevated to the Sindh High Court on July 29, 1985. He became the court's chief justice on April 15, 1996. As the chief justice, he famously ordered the third FIR in the 1996 Murtaza Bhutto murder case. On November 4, 1997, he was selected to sit on the Supreme Court of Pakistan. In 1999, he barred the Nawaz Sharif government from arresting Najam Sethi.

After General Pervez Musharraf seized power in October 1999, Kazi was among five judges who refused to take office under the first Provisional Constitutional Order in 2000. After his retirement, Kazi led a quiet life in Karachi, but his name was mentioned in 2013 to be the National Accountability Bureau’s chairperson. He died on April 2, 2014, leaving behind his wife Rehana Kazi, two daughters, and a grandchild.
