= Ahmed Hussain A. Kazi =

Pakistani civil servant (1920–2007)

Chairman of the Pakistan Industrial Development Corporation

Personal details
- Born: Ahmed Hussain A. Kazi; 15 August 1920 Hyderabad, Sindh
- Died: 7 January 2007 (aged 86)
- Spouse: Ayesha Kazi
- Education: Bombay University (B.A.(Hons) and LLB)
- Occupation: Lawyer economist
- Profession: Civil servant Mathematician
- National Awards: Tamgha-e-Pakistan

Ahmed Hussain A. Kazi Tamgha-e-Pakistan (Medal of Pakistan) Award (15 August 1920 – 7 January 2007) was a civil servant of Pakistan and senior advocate of the Supreme Court of Pakistan, who shaped the internal revenue, economic and industrialization policies during the 1970s.

== Family and Education ==
Kazi was born in Hyderabad, Sindh then part of the Bombay Presidency of British India on 15 August 1920. He finished his basic education (Matriculation examination) in 1936 and secured the Sir Jairajbhoy Peerbhoy scholarship of the University of Bombay for securing first position amongst the Muslim candidates. In 1938, Kazi received the Sir Frank Souter scholarship in his intermediate examinations. In 1940, he received a degree in Mathematics and English language. In 1942, Kazi graduated a second time, with a LL.B degree in Law and Justice from the Bombay University.

His ancestors belonged to Paat village in Dadu District. He was the only surviving child of Dr Ali Ahmed S Kazi, one of the few Muslim physicians from Sindh at the time, who founded the Liaquat Medical School, Hyderabad (now the Liaquat University of Medical and Health Sciences), was the first Medical Superintendent of Civil Hospital, Karachi and subsequently Director Health Services, Government of Sindh.

He was a grand nephew of Allama I. I. Kazi, a Muslim scholar and philosopher, and his German wife Elsa Kazi. He married his cousin Ayesha, daughter of renowned educationist Khan Bahadur Ghulam Nabi Kazi MBE in 1946.

== Career ==
Kazi received his law degree and then enrolled as an Advocate of the Chief Court now High Court of Sindh, he joined government service after competing the Indian Audits and Accounts Service and Allied Services examination of 1944 in British India. During his initial posting as Income Tax Officer, Bombay in 1945, he worked under John Burt Shearer a senior Indian Civil Service officer working as Commissioner Income Tax, Bombay. He later decided to move to and serve in Pakistan after independence of Pakistan in 1947 and held senior positions such as Commissioner of Income Tax in the cities of Karachi, Lahore and in the province of Balochistan, Member Central Board of Revenue now called Federal Board of Revenue (Pakistan), and Finance Director Pakistan Steel Mills Corporation. In the revenue work done by him, he had intensive training in commercial accounts in all types of businesses, commerce and industry giving him the necessary background for industrial management and development.

Ahmed Hussain a Kazi was promoted as Secretary to the Government of Pakistan (the highest rung in the civil service) and held the office of Chairman Pakistan Industrial Development Corporation, the largest industrial conglomerate at that time, from 1974 to 1978. During this period, he was also Chairman of all the gas companies of Pakistan including Sui Gas Transmission company, Indus Gas Company, Karachi Gas Company and Sui Northern Gas Pipelines. He also remained Chairman, Pakistan Institute of Management. Some of the PIDC projects he headed included Harnai Woolen Mills, Talpur Textile Mills, Liquified Petroleum Gas project in Quetta and Larkana, Timber Seasoning Plant, PIDC Printing Press, Director, Forest Industries Complex, Harnai Woolen Mills, Mineral Development Program in Balochistan, Specialized Refractory Plant, Sor Range Coal Mines, Rock Salt Mines in Khewra, Punjab and several other sites, Coal Briquetting Plant, Quetta, Timber Preservation and Seasoning Plant, Qaidabad Woolen Mills, General Refractories, Indus Steel Pipes, Haripur Rosin and Turpentine, Shahdadkot Textile Mills, Bawany Sugar Mills, Larkana Sugar Mills and Bannu Sugar Mills. He was also the first Managing Director of the National Fertilizer Corporation and Pakistan-Iran Textiles and served on the board of directors of the Maple Leaf Cement Factory, White Cement Industries, Khurram Chemicals, Lyallpur Chemicals and Fertilizers, Pak-American Fertilizers, Makerwal Collieries, Crescent Jute Products, Zeal Pak Cement, Pak Arab Fertilizers.

== Post retirement activity ==
A H A Kazi seen after his retirement at a social occasion in 1990

After his retirement in 1979, he practiced as an advocate of the Supreme Court of Pakistan until his appointment as Chairman adhoc Public Accounts Committee Sindh. He held the latter position until the induction of the Provincial Assembly of Sindh in 1985. He was awarded the civil award of Tamgha-e-Pakistan at an early point in his career in recognition of his loyalty and integrity to Pakistan by the then President of Pakistan Yahya Khan.

== Death ==
Kazi died on 7 January 2007 at the age of 86, and was survived by a widow Mrs Ayesha Kazi, daughter Dr Nilofer Qureshi (a Professor of Basic Medical Sciences at the University of Missouri–Kansas City), and two sons Safdar Kazi (Senior Vice President Sindh Bank Limited) and Dr Ghulam Nabi Kazi (National Professional Officer of the World Health Organization Pakistan). His grand children include Arif Qureshi, Sonya Kazi, Ali Ahmed Kazi, Asad Kazi and Elsa Kazi Jr. He has also left behind two great grand children Ari and Zoe Qureshi.

== See also ==
- Allama I. I. Kazi
- Elsa Kazi
- Dr Ali Ahmed S Kazi
- Khan Bahadur Ghulam Nabi Kazi
- A G N Kazi
- Justice Mushtak Ali Kazi
- Justice Bashir Ghulam Nabi Kazi
- Ghulam Nabi Kazi
- List of Pakistanis
- List of Sindhi people
- Sindh
- Paat
- University of Mumbai
- Pakistan Industrial Development Corporation
- High Court of Sindh
- Supreme Court of Pakistan
- Federal Board of Revenue (Pakistan)
- Sui Northern Gas Pipelines
- Pakistan Steel Mills
- Provincial Assembly of Sindh
- Indian Audits and Accounts Service

Government offices
Preceded by A R Faridi	Chairman, Pakistan Industrial Development Corporation; 1974–1978	Succeeded by M A G M Akhter

Government offices
Preceded by G D Memon	Chairman Public Accounts Committee, Sindh Legislature; 1984–1985	Succeeded by Akhtar Ali Ghulam Kazi
