= Marvi Mazhar =

Pakistani politician

Marvi Pir Mazhar (Sindhi: ماروي مظهر) was a member of Pakistan Peoples Party in Sindh Assembly from 2003 to 2008. She was elected from PS-74 Dadu-IV in Dadu, Sindh, Pakistan. Marvi Mazhar is the daughter of Pir Mazhar Ul Haq of Pakistan Peoples Party in Sindh Assembly and former Senior Minister with the Portfolio of Education in the Sindh Cabinet. She was a member of Sindh Assembly's Standing Committee on Education.

== See also ==
- Pir Mazhar Ul Haq
- Qazis of Hyderabad
- Pakistan Peoples Party
