= Syed Osman Ali =

Pakistani civil servant

S. Osman Ali

7th Governor of the State Bank of Pakistan
- In office 1 December 1975 – 1 July 1978
- Preceded by: Ghulam Ishaq Khan
- Succeeded by: Aftab Ghulam Nabi Kazi

Personal details
- Occupation: Civil servant

Syed Osman Ali was a Pakistani civil servant who served as the Governor of the State Bank of Pakistan from 1975 to 1978.

== Biography ==
Osman Ali studied economics and began his career as a civil servant in the Indian Civil Services in 1934. His family included other senior government personnel: his sister married Aziz Ahmed (civil servant) and among his cousins were the wives of Nazir Ahmed (physicist) and HMS Choudri, as well as Muhammad Raziuddin Siddiqui.

He served as the Federal Secretary in the Ministries of Industries, Commerce and Economic Affairs between 1959 and 1966, executive director of the World Bank in Washington between 1968 and 1972, and Pakistan Ambassador to Belgium and Luxembourg from 1966 to 1968.
