= Lohum Jo Daro =

Archaeological site in Sindh, Pakistan

Coordinates: 26.954853°N 67.819674°E

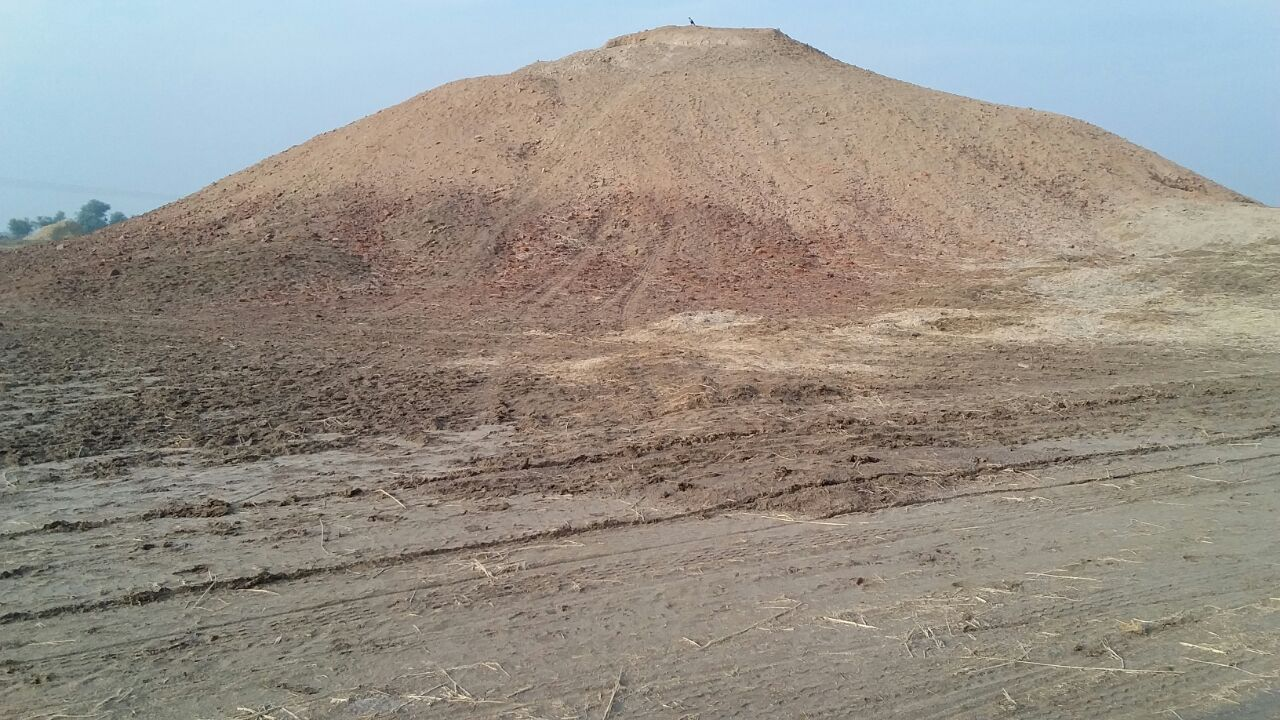
Loham Jo Daro

Lohum Jo Daro (Sindhi:لوهم جو دڙو, Urdu:لوہم جو دڑو) is an archaeological site which is situated close to Piaro Goth railway station previous Larkana now Dadu District, Sindh, Pakistan. It is near to the bank of Indus River. The site belongs to the late period of Indus Valley Civilization like Jhukar-Jo-Daro, Chanhudaro and others. This site was excavated by N. G. Majumdar during the excavations in Sindh in the 1930s. The terracotta bull figurine was discovered from lohum Jo Daro. The findings were examined at the site proves that the flow of Indus River was closed to Lohum Jo Daro in Chalcolithic period. As of January 2026 there is a settlement located on the archaeological site.
