= Mukhtiar Ahmad Junejo =

Pakistani judge and politician

Mukhtar Ahmad Junejo

Judge of Supreme Court of Pakistan

Personal details
- Born: 2 September 1930 Sindh, Pakistan
- Died: 13 June 2017 (aged 87)

Honorable Mr. Justice Mukhtar Ahmad Junejo (2 September 1930 - 13 June 2017) was a judge of the Supreme Court of Pakistan.

A full court reference of the Supreme Court was held in his honour in November 2018.
