= Umar Bin Muhammad Daudpota =

Researcher, historian, linguist and scholar

Dr Umar Bin Muhammad Daudpota
- عمر بن محمد دائودپوٽو
- Born: 25 March 1896; Talti, Dadu District, British India (now in Pakistan)
- Died: 22 November 1958 (aged 61); Karachi, Buried at Bhit Shah, Sindh, Pakistan
- Education: Sindh Madersat-Ul-Islam High School Karachi; D.J. Science College Karachi; Cambridge University, England
- Occupations: Principal, Director of Public Instructions
- Employer(s): Sindh Madersatul Islam High School, Karachi, Education Department of Sindh
- Title: Shams-ul-Ulama

Umar Bin Mohammad Daudpota (25 March 1896 – 22 November 1958) (Sindhi: عمر بن محمد داؤد پوٽو) was a Sindhi researcher, historian, linguist and scholar of the Indus Valley.

== Life ==
Daudpota was born on 25 March 1896 at Talti, Dadu District, British India. His primary education was in his hometown. He matriculated from Sindh Madressatul Islam in Karachi and then enrolled at D. J. Science College, Sindh at Karachi, where he received his BA and MA degrees. His education continued in England at Emmanuel College, University of Cambridge, where he was awarded a Ph.D. degree.

After completion of his doctoral degree, he returned to his homeland and was appointed as Principal of Sind Madrassa. In 1930, he joined Ismail Yusuf College, Bombay, as professor of Arabic. He was appointed Director of Public Instruction in Karachi in 1939, taking over from Khan Bahadur Ghulam Nabi Kazi, and remained in that post until 1948. He was given the honorary title of Shams-ul-Ulama ("Sun of the Scholars") by the British Government.

Daudpotra was a member of the Pakistan Public Service Commission from 1950 to 1955. He performed Hajj in 1955. He served as superior (caretaker) of Quarterly Mehran in 1957.

Daudpota did his scholarly research in English, Arabic, Persian, and Sindhi. His fields of research included history, poetry, criticism, biography, religion and Sindhi literature. He wrote more than two dozen books and a number of columns and essays.

== Death ==
Daudpota died on 22 November 1958 at Karachi. His last resting place is at the shrine of Shah Abdul Latif Bhittai at Bhitshah, Sindh.

Daudpota was the father of Air Marshal Azim Daudpota, who also served as a Governor of Sindh and as a chairman of Pakistan International Airlines.

== Bibliography ==
- Maro je Malir Ja by Khadim Hussain Chandio
- A Sindhi Scholar, by Muhammad Umar Chand
- Mangrio
- The Chachnama (Persian Text) - Edited by Umar Bin Muhammad Daudpota
- Murshid-ul-Mubtada (Arabic reader for students)
- Minhaj-ul-Ashqeen ("The Path of the Lovers")
- Shah Abdul Karim Bulri Wari Jo Kalam
- Abdul Raheem Grohiri Jo Kalam
- Abyat-e-Sindhi (Verses of Muhammad Zaman Luwaree Shareef)
- Munhnji Mukhtasir Aatam Kahani ("My short autobiography")
- Surha Gul ("Perfumed Flowers")
- Hindustan Mein Aam Taleem ("Mass Education in India")
- Sindhi Nazam
- Choonda Sindhi Nasar Ain Nazam
- Bayan-ul-Arfeen (A short version of Malfoodhaat of Shah Abdul Kareem of Bulri)
- Selection from Hafiz and Arif (English)
- Tarikh-i-Masumi written by Mir Masum Shah, edited by Umar Bin Muhammad Daudpota (1938)

== See also ==
- Allama I. I. Kazi
- Mirza Kalich Baig
- Nabi Bux Khan Baloch
- Muhammad Ibrahim Joyo
