= Ali Muhammad Rashidi =

Pakistani politician

Ali Muhammad Rashdi
- علي محمد راشدي
- Born: 5 August 1905; Village Bahman, District Larkana, Bombay Presidency, British India
- Died: 14 March 1987; Karachi, Pakistan

Ali Muhammad Rashdi (Urdu: پیر علی محمد راشدی (1905–1987) was a Pakistani writer, journalist, politician, parliamentarian, and diplomat. Notably, he served as Pakistan's ambassador to the Philippines from 1957 to 1961 and to China from 1961 to 1962. Rashdi also held ministerial positions in Sindh and served as the central minister for information and broadcasting. He was the elder brother of scholar Hassam-ud-Din Rashidi.

== Early life ==
Rashidi's father Muhammad Hamid Shah lived in Bahman village, Ratodero Taluka, Larkana District, Sindh. Rashidi got his early education from Muhammad Soomar and Muhammad Sidiq. He taught himself Persian, Urdu and English. He also studied English with Marmaduke Pickthall.

== Career ==
Rashidi started his career as a journalist for the Sindh News newspaper in 1924. He was appointed as the secretary of Mohammad Ayub Khuhro in 1927. He was appointed editor of Al Rashid in 1928 at Sukkur. He served as editor of Al Amin. He started the newspaper Sitar-e-Sindh in 1934. In 1948, he became the editor of the English-language newspaper Sindh Observer. He served as the president of the Pakistan Newspapers Editors Association.

=== Politics ===
Rashidi's political career began in 1926 when he joined the Sindh Muhammadan Association where he fought for the election of Sindh in Bombay. In 1934 he joined the Peoples Party of Sir Shahnawaz Bhutto. He joined the Muslim League in 1938 where he supported the Pakistani cause for independence by holding the positions of Secretary of the Sindh Provincial Muslim League and Secretary of the Foreign Committee. According to the late Yusuf Abdullah Haroon (an elder statesman of Pakistan), Rashidi was involved in the drafting of the Pakistan Resolution of 1940, also known as the Lahore Resolution. After 1947, he was instrumental in reinstating the Gaddi of Pir Pagara while ignoring the Frontier Regulation. He was elected MPA in the Sindh Assembly in the election of 1953, thereafter appointed Minister of Revenue. In the era of Mohammad Ayub Khuhro, he served as the Minister of Health, Revenue and Information. He also served as the Federal Minister for Information under Prime Minister Chaudhry Muhammad Ali.

=== Diplomat and author ===
He served as Pakistan's ambassador to the Philippines from 1957 to 1961. He also served as the Ambassador to China for 10 months, during which he concluded negotiations for a border agreement between Pakistan and China that Zulfiqar Ali Bhutto later signed on behalf of Pakistan. His work and journalism also took him to Hong Kong.

Rashidi wrote books in Sindhi, Urdu and English on politics, biographies, local issues and diaries.

== Family ==
Pir Hussain Shah Rashdi (Son)

Pir Mohsin Shah Rashdi (Son)

Pir Hassan Shah Rashdi (Son)

Pir Adil Shah Rashdi ( Son)

== Selected publications ==
- Uhee Denhin Uhee Shenih (3 volumes)
- Jager Dari Jo Khatimo
- Sindh jee Nain Wizarat
- Boodin Ja Imdadi Masla
- Cheen jee (diary)
- Imam Inqlaab
- Sindh Ways and Days
