= Hakeem Fateh Mohammad Sehwani =

Sindh politician and scholar

Hakeem Fateh Mohammad Sewhani Sindhi: حڪيم فتح محمد سيوهاڻي
- Born: Fateh Mohammad; 1882; Sehwan Sharif, Dadu now Jamshoro District, Sindh
- Died: 13 December 1942 (aged 60); Sehwan Sharif, Dadu Sindh
- Occupations: Poet, Scholar, Journalist, Politician
- Writing career
- Pen name: "حڪيم"
- Genre: Aesthetic
- Subject: Poetry
- Notable works: Books, Linguistic
- Movement: Progressive

Hakeem Fateh Mohammad Sehwani (Sindhi: حڪيم فتح محمد سيوهاڻي; 1882 – 13 December 1942) was a scholar, poet, literary, journalist and politician of Sindh.

== Education ==
Sehwani was born at Sehwan Sharif in what was then Dadu District (now in Jamshoro District), Sindh, Pakistan.

He received education in Persian and Arabic languages. He became a student of Molvi Mohammad Umer Channa and Molvi Atta Mohammad in Mehar, who were then well-known teachers in Sindh. At the age of 21, he qualified from the madrasa. He opened his own madrasa at Shah Sadar, Sehwan and practiced Tibb (as a Hakeem), which was his ancestral profession.

== Professional career ==
Within short period of time, Hakeem Fateh Mohammad Sehwani was appointed as teacher of Persian at a Madarsa, owned by Syed Allah Aando Shah.

== Political career ==
Hakeem Sehwani took part in political activities under the guidance of Syed Allah Aando Shah. Sehwani would say, “A man without a political insight is like a body without a soul”.

He was one of the main leaders of Jamiat Ulema-e-Hind and an opponent of the British Empire in the Indian subcontinent. He also remained secretary of Jamiat ul Ulima (Sindh). Molana sahab was active worker and secretary of Khilafat Movement in Sindh. He opened a moderate Madarsa for teaching Arabic and Persian languages and a Matabb at Karachi, which was a place of gathering for party workers.

== Literary career ==
Sehwani was an unyielding journalist. He published a magazine Al Islam and Aljamia from Karachi in 1925. Al Jamia was published in three languages, Sindhi, English and Arabic, all at a time. He used simple and proverbial Sindhi in his poetry and prose.

== Publications ==
Hakeem Fateh Mohammad Sehwani wrote sixteen books and was the first writer to publish a biography of Muhammad in Sindhi. He is also renowned for his book Qalandar Namo on Lal Shabaz Qalandar, a revered Sufi saint. His other books are on various topics, such as “Bahar e Ikhlaq,” a collection of poems. He also composed nationalistic poetry. He formerly used “Sagheer” and late “Hakeem” as his pen name.

Religiously, he belonged to the Deobandi school of thought. Doing charity and favour to people was his hobby. Some of his works are: Hayat e Nabi (S.A.W), Ikhlaq e Mohammadi (S.A.W), Fatheh Mohammadi (S.A.W), Dastan e Qoum, Ahwal Lal Shahbaz Qalander, Meeran ji Sahibi.

== Recognition ==
The Government of Sindh recognized his eternal services and in his remembrance, some primary schools were named after him.

== Death ==
Hakeem Fateh Mohammad Sehwani died on 13 December 1942.
