= Pir Mazhar Ul Haq =

Pakistani politician

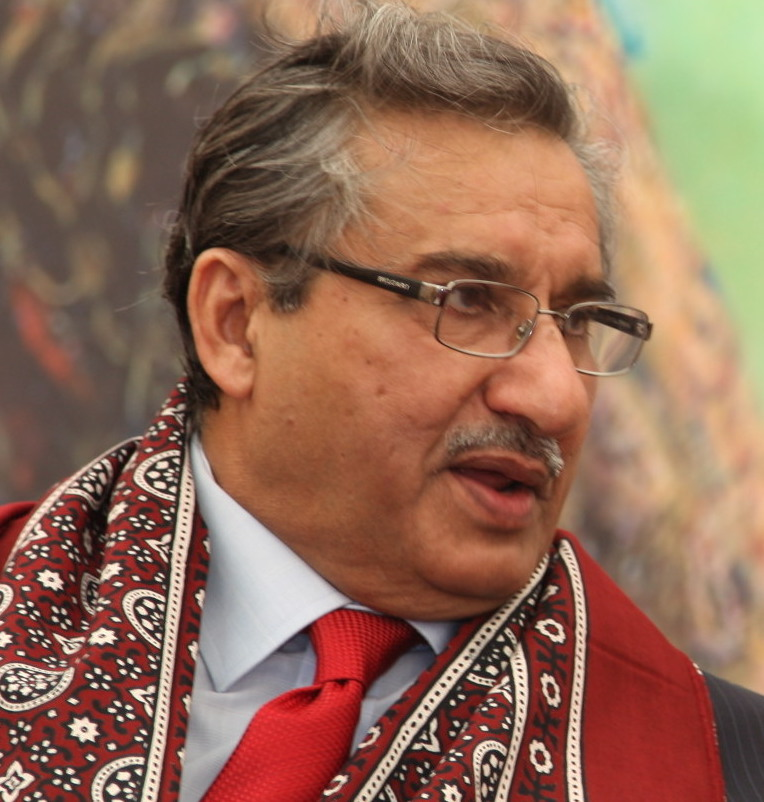

Education Minister of Sindh

Personal details
- Born: 14 September 1947 (age 78) Dadu, Sindh, Pakistan
- Party: Pakistan Peoples Party (Parliamentarians)
- Parent(s): Mrs Hameeda Pir Shah Nawaz (mother); Pir Shah Nawaz (father)
- Occupation: Politician

Pir Mazhar Ul Haq (Urdu: پیر مظہر الحق; born 14 September 1947) is a Pakistani politician who remained a member of the Provincial Assembly of Sindh from 1988 to 2013. He also remained as the Education minister of Sindh.

== Early life ==
He was born 14 September 1949 to Pir Shahnawaz He did BA and MA in Political science from University of Sindh.

== Political career ==
Pir Mazhar ul Haq was first elected as a member of the Provincial Assembly of Sindh in the general elections of 1988 from Constituency PS-74 (Dadu-IV) as a candidate of Pakistan Peoples Party. Pir Mazhar Ul Haq remained as a minister for housing and town planning, and law and parliamentary affairs respectively. He was the Parliamentary leader of Pakistan Peoples Party in the Sindh Assembly, a member of the Central Executive Committee of the Pakistan Peoples Party and the Senior Minister in the Sindh Provincial Government, holding the portfolios of Education and Literacy and Criminal Prosecution Service. He was continuously elected in all the general elections except general elections of 2002. His daughter Marvi Mazhar contested general election from Constituency PS-74 (Dadu-IV) in 2002 and became successful as member of the Provincial Assembly of Sindh.
