= Ghulam Nabi Kazi =

Pakistani Educationist (1884-1955

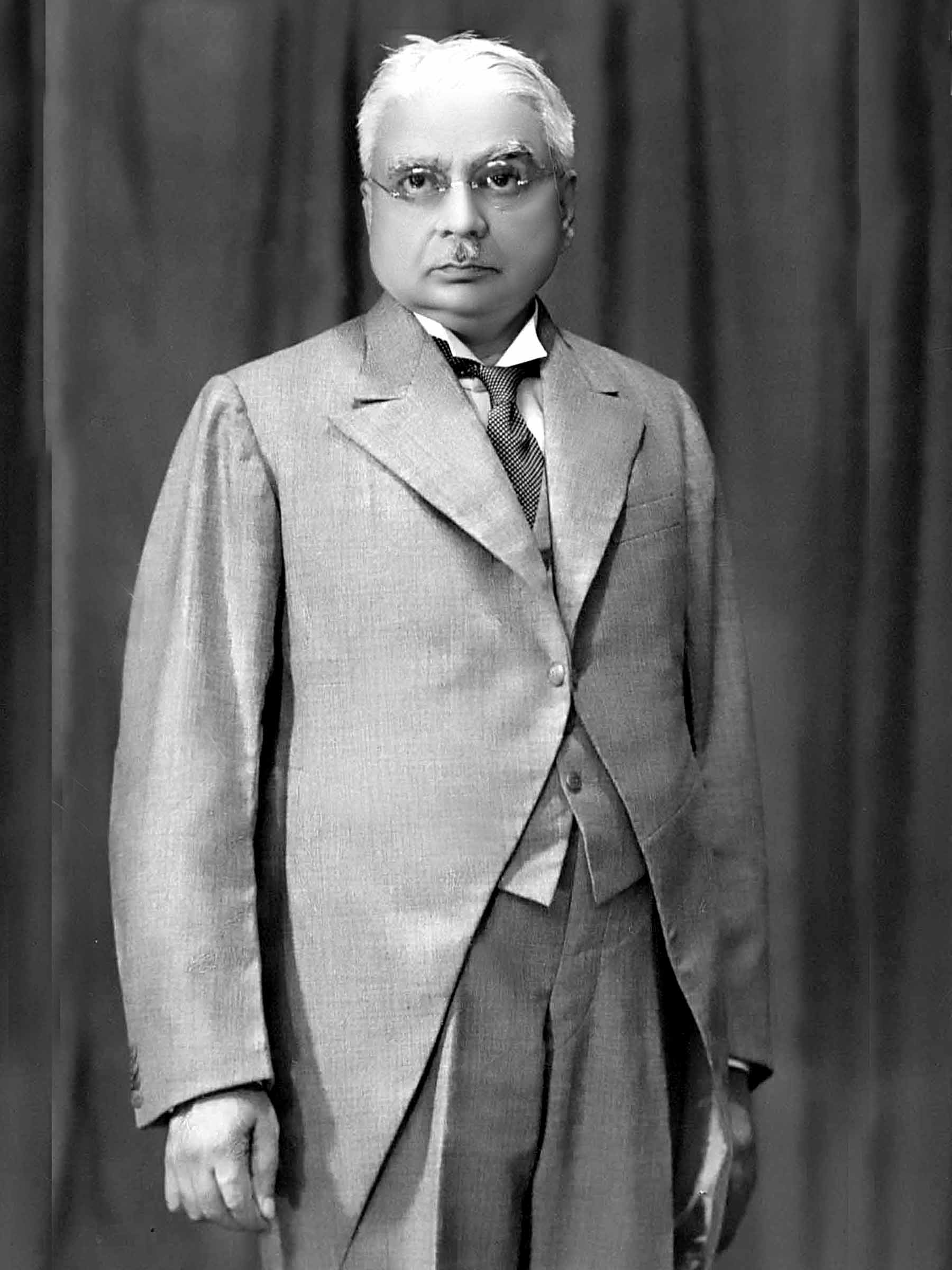
Khan Bahadur Ghulam Nabi Kazi MBE as Director Public Instruction Sindh in 1938

Khan Bahadur Ghulam Nabi Kazi MBE (b: 1884 Naushero Feroze, British India – 1955) was an educator in Sindh. He rose to the position of first Director of Public Instruction, Sindh after remaining Educational Inspector, Sindh in the Bombay Presidency during the British Empire.

== Family ==
His father, Din Mohamed Kazi, was a notable personality of the area. He was closely related to the renowned intellectual Allama I. I. Kazi. Ghulam Nabi Kazi was severely shocked when his wife Maryam was diagnosed with cancer in 1942 by his cousin Dr Ali Ahmed S Kazi and her death devastated him. He died in 1955 and was survived by two sons A G N Kazi and Justice Bashir Ghulam Nabi Kazi, two daughters Khaki and Ayesha, married to Mumtaz Kazi and Ahmed Hussain A Kazi, respectively.

== Career ==
Kazi started his career as Principal of the Naushero Feroze Madressah. High schools during those days were called madressahs to dispel the impression that they were averse to religion and this name served to increase the enrolment of students. As soon as Sindh became a separate province in 1936, he was appointed to head the Education Sector as Director of Public Instructions Sindh by the Governor Sir Lancelot Graham. In that capacity he was also Member of the Education Advisory Board of India and often visited the capital Delhi to represent his province in these meetings.Member and Invitees to the meetings of the Education Advisory Board in Delhi (1935-1940). He was with Sir Lancelot Graham when the latter visited the Sindh Madressah School on 8 August 1936. He carried out several reforms in the education sector with the help of his colleagues such as Khan Bahadur S D Contractor and Khan Bahadur Noor-ud-Din Ghulamally Nana. He retired in 1939, and was succeeded by Dr Umar Bin Muhammad Daudpota.

== Titles awarded ==
- He was awarded the title of Khan Bahadur in 1934 by King George VI of the United Kingdom.
- He was knighted Member of the Most Excellent Order of the British Empire (MBE) on 2 January 1939 for his efforts for good governance in the education sector and rapid improvement in the literacy rate in the province.

Government offices
Preceded by New Office	Director of Public Instruction Sind; 1936-1939	Succeeded by Umar Bin Muhammad Daudpota
