= Bashir Ghulam Nabi Kazi =

Pakistani jurist, educationist (1921–1986)

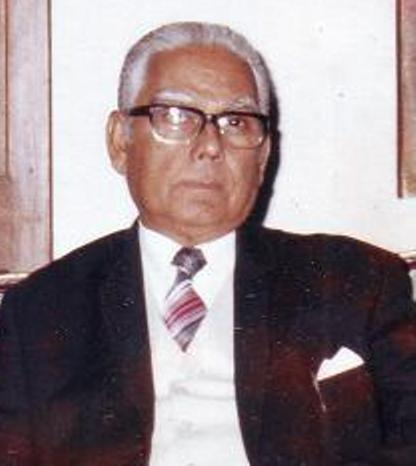
Justice B G N Kazi at a social occasion

Justice Bashir Ghulam Nabi Kazi better known as Justice B G N Kazi (1921–1986) was the younger son of Khan Bahadur Ghulam Nabi Kazi MBE, a veteran educationist of British India, and a renowned jurist of Pakistan.

== Family ==
Justice Kazi's elder brother A G N Kazi remained at the helm of economic ministries of the Government of Pakistan for several decades. He was a nephew of intellectual Allama I. I. Kazi and German writer Elsa Kazi.

== Career ==
Justice B G N Kazi entered the judicial service and after his initial posting as a civil judge, he was appointed Deputy Secretary and subsequently Solicitor in the Law department of the Government of West Pakistan. In 1970 after the re-creation of Sindh as a province, he was appointed as Secretary in the Law Department of the Government of Sindh. Subsequently he worked as Registrar of the High Court of Sindh and District and Sessions Judge of Karachi. In 1978 he was appointed as a Member of the Federal Services Tribunal and subsequently as a Member of the Monopoly Control Authority, Government of Pakistan. In 1980 he was elevated as a Judge of the High Court of Sindh. Justice B G N Kazi was well known for his impeccable integrity and knowledge of legal affairs. After retiring from the High Court of Sindh in 1983, he worked for two years on the bench of the Federal Shariat Court.

== Post-retirement activity ==
Justice Kazi retired from the Federal Shariat Court in 1985. Subsequently he was involved in social work and also monitored zakat disbursement in the Civil Hospital Karachi.

== Death ==
Justice B G N Kazi died in 1986 after a brief illness, and was survived by his widow Mehrunissa and three daughters Safia, Salma and Asma. His son Rafiq Ahmed Kazi, a distinguished professor of physics in the University of Sindh had died earlier in 1981 due to renal failure. His two sisters Khaki and Ayesha were married to Mumtaz Kazi and Ahmed Hussain A Kazi, respectively who were both eminent civil servants of Pakistan. His grand children include Sabena, Jamshed, Maria, Nazar Muhammad, Iftikhar and Manzar.

== See also ==
- Ahmed Hussain A. Kazi
