= Babarlo =

Village in Sindh, Pakistan

Babarlo Babarloi, Baberloi
- Deh
- Location in Sindh Babarlo (Pakistan)
- Coordinates: 27.649122°N 68.836989°E
- Country: Pakistan
- Region: Sindh
- District: Khairpur
- Taluka: Khairpur

Population (2017)
  - Total: 13,636
- Time zone: UTC+5 (PST)
  - Summer (DST): UTC+6 (PDT)

Babarlo, also spelled Babarloi or Baberloi, is a village and deh in Khairpur taluka of Khairpur District, Sindh. As of 2017, it has a population of 13,636, in 2,409 households.

== History ==
Babarlo has the dargah (shrine) for the Muslim pir Makhdoom Pir Syed Rajan Qattaar Jahania, who came to Sindh from Uch Sharif sometime in the mid-19th century. During the saint's urs on 14-16 Shaban, thousands of devotees come to pay their respects to him, offer prayers, and ask for mannats, or favours. This shrine has a unique tradition that, since the saint was reputedly fond of riding donkeys, devotees are expected to offer a donkey in return for a mannat. The donkeys offered this way are said to become "special", which makes them desirable for purchase. The shrine's caretakers sell the offered donkeys and spend the money on the upkeep of the shrine (which is privately maintained).

Babarlo is identified with the Babarlūka mentioned in the Tarkhan-Nama as the residence of the Mughal emperor Humayun for five months beginning in approximately December 1542. The text says, "Having taken up quarters in the town of Lahari (Rohri), he established his own residence within the walls of the delightful garden of Babarluka." A similar account appears in the Chach-Nama, which uses the spelling of Babarlō for the place. The Chach-Nama offers more context behind Humayun's stay: in anticipation for Humayun's arrival, Babarlo "with its four celebrated gardens" was decorated and its fort repaired in order to be a suitable and secure residence for the emperor and his family. It also says that Humayun's camp consisted of some 200,000 people (two lakh), including troops and camp followers; they were so numerous that their camp covered the whole distance between Babarlo and Rohri. It also gives a slightly different duration for Humayun's stay: "about 6 months".

The 1951 census recorded the village of Babarlo (under the spelling "Baberloi") as having an estimated population of about 2,760, in about 650 houses. It had a police station, post office, dispensary, and school at that point.

In November 2021, the rape and murder of a 10-year-old Hindu boy in Babarlo sparked protests in several cities throughout northern Sindh.
