= Imdad Ali Imam Ali Kazi =

Pakistani scholar, jurist, educationist (1886–1968)

- امداد علي امام علي قاضي
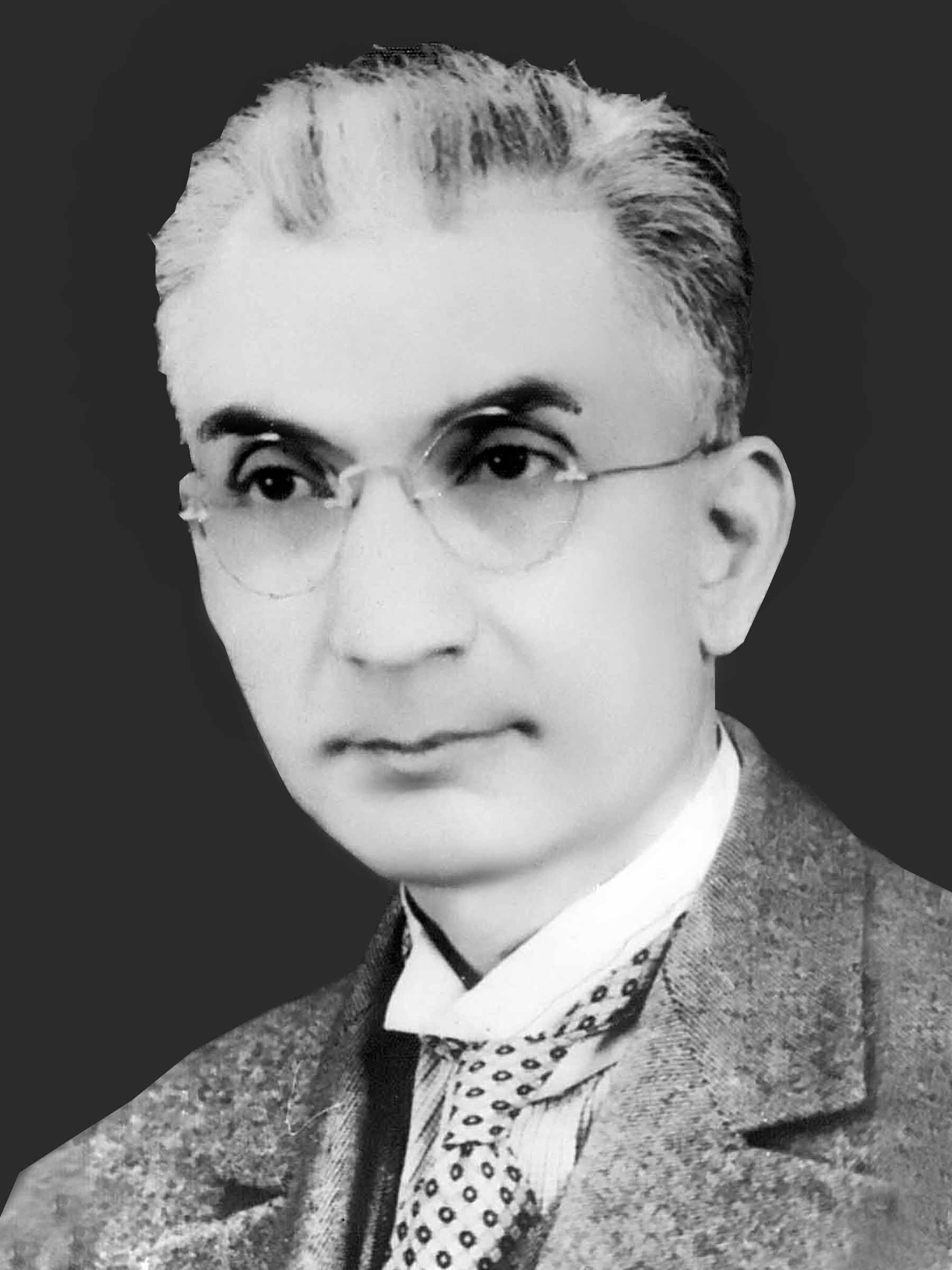
- I. I. Kazi
- Born: 9 April 1886; Village Paat (now Dadu District), Bombay Presidency, British India
- Died: 13 April 1968 (aged 80-81); Hyderabad, Pakistan (buried at Jamshoro)
- Education: Economics, Law
- Occupations: Judge, Vice Chancellor
- Employer(s): University of Sindh, Jamshoro, Pakistan
- Known for: Educationist, Academic Leader, Lawyer, Writer
- Spouse(s): Elsa Kazi (married in 1910; died 28 May 1967)

Imdad Ali Imam Ali Kazi (Sindhi: امداد علي امام علي قاضي; April 1886 – 13 April 1968), commonly known as I. I. Kazi, was a Pakistani scholar, philosopher, jurist, and educationist. He is considered to be a founding father of the University of Sindh at its present location at Jamshoro. He published works of Sindhi art, literature, mysticism, education, religion and history.

== Education and early life ==
Imdad Ali Imam Ali Kazi was the second son of the second wife of Kazi Imam Ali Ansari, the District Magistrate of Hyderabad, then in British India. He was born in April 1886 (sources vary regarding the exact date), at Hyderabad. His family was originally from Paat in Dadu District. He studied the Quran, and the Persian, Arabic, Sindhi and Urdu languages with a private tutor.

Kazi went to London in 1907 for higher education. He studied Economics at the London School of Economics and took numerous other courses. In 1910, he married Elsa, a German woman who was well-versed in literature. In 1911, Kazi was called to the bar as a barrister-at-law by the Honourable Society of Lincoln's Inn. After this, he returned home to Hyderabad with his wife.

Inscriptions on the dome of the last resting place of Mr and Mrs I. I. Kazi in Sindh University, Jamshoro

Kazi studied Arabic in Cairo in 1932 and in 1933 continued those studies at the London School of Oriental and African Studies.

While he was studying in England, he was a contemporary of Allama Iqbal and Muhammad Ali Jinnah.

== Career ==
The British offered the young barrister the post of Civil Judge of Tando Muhammad Khan. He also served as the district and sessions judge of Khairpur during the British rule.

Kazi served as Vice-Chancellor of University of Sindh from 1951 to 1958.

Along with his wife Elsa, he wrote a book on comparative religion, The Adventures of the Brown Girl in her Search for God, which was published by Arthur H Stockwell Ltd., England, in 1933. They also worked on a translation of the verses of Shah Abdul Latif Bhittai.

== Death and legacy ==
Kazi died on 13 April 1968 in Hyderabad, Pakistan. He was buried at the campus of University of Sindh at Jamshoro. Several books and articles have been written on the life of Kazi and tributes paid to him annually on the anniversary of his death.

Many well-known scholars such as Abul Kalam Azad, Allama Iqbal, Ubaidullah Sindhi and George Bernard Shaw, were deeply impressed by his writings.

== Books, essays & articles ==
The following is a selection of significant works authored or co-authored by Imdad Ali Imam Ali Kazi, including full-length books and notable essays and articles:

Original title	English title	Year	Publisher	Type	Description
The Adventures of the Brown Girl in Her Search for God	—	1933	Arthur H. Stockwell Ltd., England	Book	Comparative-religion narrative co‑authored with his wife Elsa Kazi, tracing a spiritual quest through allegorical storytelling.
Casual Peeps at Sophia	—	1967	Sindhi Adabi Board, Hyderabad	Book	A collection of his essays and addresses covering philosophy, religion, history, poetry, art and literary criticism.
Epistles of Divine Wisdom	—	2015	Sindhi Adabi Board, Hyderabad	Book	A posthumous compilation of Kazi's correspondence, offering insight into his spiritual and philosophical thought.
Surah Al-‘Alaa (سورة الاعلیٰ)	The Significance of Surah Al‑‘Alaa	—	—	Essay	A scholarly tafsir lecture exploring cosmic symbolism and metaphysical evolution in the Qur’anic chapter Al‑‘Alaa.
—	Translation of Western Philosophy into Sindhi (Descartes, Kant, Nietzsche etc.)	1930s (est.)	Various academic forums	Essay/Translation	Introduced European philosophical thought into Sindhi literature, laying the groundwork for modern Sindhi intellectualism.
