= List of Sahitya Akademi Translation Prize winners for Urdu =

List of winners of a literary honor in India

Part of a series on

Sahitya Akademi Awards
Category
Sahitya Akademi Award winners by language
- Assamese
- Bengali
- Bodo
- Dogri
- English
- Gujarati
- Hindi
- Kannada
- Kashmiri
- Konkani
- Maithili
- Malayalam
- Marathi
- Meitei (Manipuri)
- Nepali
- Odia
- Punjabi
- Rajasthani
- Sanskrit
- Santali
- Sindhi
- Tamil
- Telugu
- Urdu
Sahitya Akademi Translation Prizes
- Assamese
- Bengali
- Bodo
- Dogri
- English
- Gujarati
- Hindi
- Kannada
- Kashmiri
- Konkani
- Maithili
- Malayalam
- Marathi
- Meitei (Manipuri)
- Nepali
- Odia
- Punjabi
- Rajasthani
- Sanskrit
- Santali
- Sindhi
- Tamil
- Telugu
- Urdu
Sahitya Akademi Yuva Puraskar
- Assamese
- Bengali
- Bodo
- Dogri
- English
- Gujarati
- Hindi
- Kannada
- Kashmiri
- Konkani
- Maithili
- Malayalam
- Meitei (Manipuri)
- Marathi
- Nepali
- Odia
- Punjabi
- Rajasthani
- Sanskrit
- Santali
- Sindhi
- Tamil
- Telugu
- Urdu
Sahitya Akademi Bal Sahitya Puraskar
- Assamese
- Bengali
- Bodo
- Dogri
- English
- Gujarati
- Hindi
- Kannada
- Kashmiri
- Konkani
- Maithili
- Malayalam
- Meitei (Manipuri)
- Marathi
- Nepali
- Odia
- Punjabi
- Rajasthani
- Sanskrit
- Santali
- Sindhi
- Tamil
- Telugu
- Urdu
Related
- Eighth Schedule to the Constitution of India
- Official Languages Commission
- List of languages by number of native speakers in India

Sahitya Akademi Translation Prizes are given each year to writers for their outstanding translations work in the 24 languages, since 1989.

== Recipients ==
Following is the list of recipients of Sahitya Akademi translation prizes for their works written in Urdu language. The award, as of 2019, consisted of ₹50,000.

Year	Translator	Title of the translation	Original title	Original language	Genre	Original Author	References
1989	Hameed Almas	Farmoodat	108 Vachanas	Kannada	Vachana	Basaveswara	
1990	Abdus Sattar Dalvi	Ran Angan	Ranangan	Marathi	Novel	Vishram Bedekar	
1991	Shanti Ranjan Bhattacharya	Gulshan-e-Sehat	Arogya Niketan	Bengali	Novel	Tarasankar Bandyopadhyay	
1992	Khalid Agaskar	Katha	Collection	Marathi	Short stories	Various authors	
1993	Akhtar Hasan	Jawaharlal Nehru Ek Swaneh	Jawaharlal Nehru: A Biography	English	Biography	Sarvepalli Gopal	
1994	Balraj Verma	Lok Raj	lyaruingam	Assamese	Novel	B. K. Bhattacharyya	
1995	Rifat Sarosh	Rani Laxmi Bai	Rani Laxmi Bai	Hindi	Novel	Vrindavan Lal Verma	
1996	Meem Meem Rajinder	Pahad Per Aag	Fire on the Mountain	English	Novel	Anita Desai	
1997	Prakash Fikri	Amrit Aur Vish	Amrit Aur Vish	Hindi	Novel	Amritlal Nagar	
1998	Salam Bin Razzaq	Asri Hindi Kahaniyan	Samesamayik Hindi Kahaniyan	Hindi	Short stories	Various authors	
1999	Haider Jafri Syed	Zindaginama-Zinda Rukh	Zindagi Nama-Zinda Rukh	Hindi	Novel	Krishna Sobti	
2000	Anees Ashfaq	Kavve Aur Kala Pani	Kavve Aur Kala Pani	Hindi	Short stories	Nirmal Verma	
2001	M. Osama Faruqi	Ghalib : Shakhsiyat Aur Ahd	Ghalib : The Man, The Times	English	Biography	Pavan Varma	
2002	Rattan Singh	Ab Na Bason Ih Gaon	Ab Na Bason Ih Gaon	Punjabi	Novel	Kartar Singh Duggal	
2003	Waqar Qadri	Dalit Katha	Collection	Marathi	Short stories	Various Authors	
2004	Karamat Ali Karamat	Lafzon Ka Akash	Sabdar Akash	Odia	Poetry	Sitakant Mahapatra	
2005	Khalid Mahmood	Gauri	Gauri	Punjabi	Novel	Ajeet Cour	
2006	Sajid Rashid	Jhada Jhadti	Zadazadati	Marathi	Novel	Vishwas Patil	
2007	Ali Asghar	Rooh Ke Nagme	Selection	English	Poetry	Kamala Das (surayya)	
2008	Nusrat Zahir	Tihad Mein Mere Shab-O-Roz	My Days In Prison	English	Memoir	Iftekhar Gilani	
2009	Asma Saleem	Safar	Sunehade	Punjabi	Poetry	Amrita Pritam	
2010	Maher Mansoor	Siri Sampige	Siri Sampige	Kannada	Play	Chandrashekhara Kambara	
2011	F. S. Ejaz	Muntakhab Dalit Kahaniyan	Anthology Of Dalit Short Stories	Hindi	Short stories	Ramnika Gupta	
2012	Ather Farouqui	Babur Ki Aulad	Sons of Babur	English	Play	Salman Khurshid	
2013	Nizam Siddiqui	Kyap	Kyap	Hindi	Novel	Manohar Shyam Joshi	
2014	Ved Rahi	Lal Ded	Lal Ded	Dogri	Novel	Ved Rahi	
2015	Suhail Ahmad Farooqi	Gitanjali	Gitanjali	Bengali	Poetry	Rabindranath Tagore	
2016	Haqqani-Al Qasmi	Aangliyat	Aangliyat	Gujarati	Novel	Joseph Macwan	
2017	Mahmood Ahmed Sahar	Kalidas Ki Azeem Shairi – Megh Doot (Vol-I)	Meghadūta	Sanskrit	Poetry	Kalidasa	
2018	Zakia Mashhadi	Aakhri Salam	Shesh Namaskar	Bengali	Novel	Santosh Kumar Ghosh	
2019	Aslam Mirza	Mor Pankh	Meech Majha Mor	Marathi	Poetry	Prashant Asnare	
2020	Sabiha Anwar	Fida-e Lucknow	Tales of the City and Its People	English	Short Stories	Parveen Talha	
2021	Arjumand Ara	Bepanah Shaadmaani Ki Mumlikat	The Ministry of Utmost Happiness	English	Novel	Arundhati Roy	
2022	Renu Behl	Suno Radhika	Suno Radhika	Hindi	Poetry	Madhav Kaushik	
2023	Ahsan Ayyubi	Post Box No. 203 Nala Sopara	Post Box No. 203 Nala Sopara	Hindi	Novel	Chitra Mudgal	
2024	No Award						

== See also ==
- List of Sahitya Akademi Award winners for Urdu
