= List of Sahitya Akademi Award winners for Sindhi =

List of winners of a literary honor in India

Sahitya Akademi Award for Sindhi
- Award for contributions to Sindhi literature
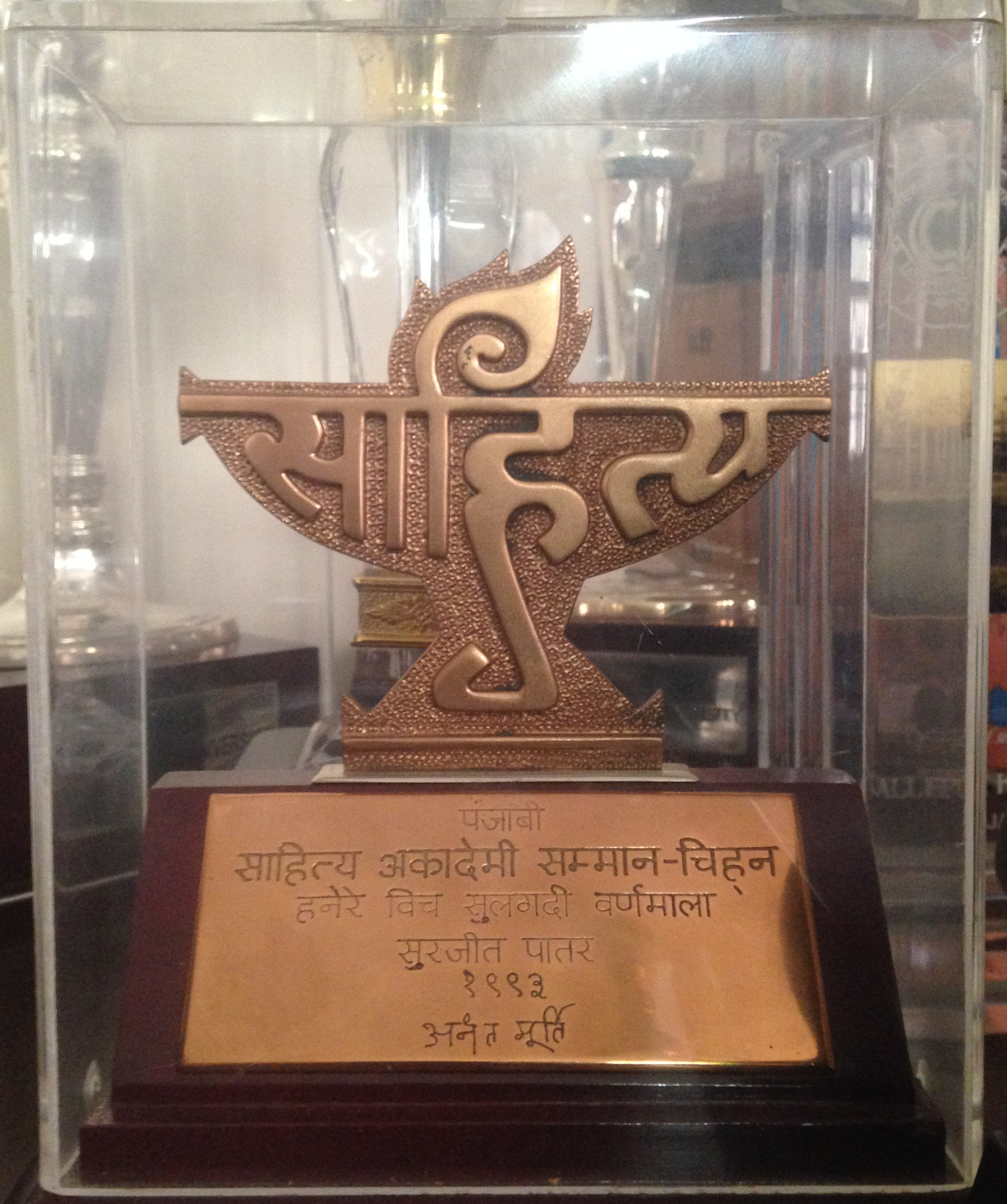
- Awarded for: Literary award in India
- Sponsored by: Sahitya Akademi, Government of India
- Reward: ₹1 lakh (US$1,100)
- First award: 1959
- Final award: 2024

Highlights
- Total awarded: 57
- First winner: Tirth Basant
- Most Recent winner: Hundraj Balwani
- Website: Official website

Part of a series on

Sahitya Akademi Awards
Category
Sahitya Akademi Award winners by language
- Assamese
- Bengali
- Bodo
- Dogri
- English
- Gujarati
- Hindi
- Kannada
- Kashmiri
- Konkani
- Maithili
- Malayalam
- Marathi
- Meitei (Manipuri)
- Nepali
- Odia
- Punjabi
- Rajasthani
- Sanskrit
- Santali
- Sindhi
- Tamil
- Telugu
- Urdu
Sahitya Akademi Translation Prizes
- Assamese
- Bengali
- Bodo
- Dogri
- English
- Gujarati
- Hindi
- Kannada
- Kashmiri
- Konkani
- Maithili
- Malayalam
- Marathi
- Meitei (Manipuri)
- Nepali
- Odia
- Punjabi
- Rajasthani
- Sanskrit
- Santali
- Sindhi
- Tamil
- Telugu
- Urdu
Sahitya Akademi Yuva Puraskar
- Assamese
- Bengali
- Bodo
- Dogri
- English
- Gujarati
- Hindi
- Kannada
- Kashmiri
- Konkani
- Maithili
- Malayalam
- Meitei (Manipuri)
- Marathi
- Nepali
- Odia
- Punjabi
- Rajasthani
- Sanskrit
- Santali
- Sindhi
- Tamil
- Telugu
- Urdu
Sahitya Akademi Bal Sahitya Puraskar
- Assamese
- Bengali
- Bodo
- Dogri
- English
- Gujarati
- Hindi
- Kannada
- Kashmiri
- Konkani
- Maithili
- Malayalam
- Meitei (Manipuri)
- Marathi
- Nepali
- Odia
- Punjabi
- Rajasthani
- Sanskrit
- Santali
- Sindhi
- Tamil
- Telugu
- Urdu
Related
- Eighth Schedule to the Constitution of India
- Official Languages Commission
- List of languages by number of native speakers in India

This is a list of Sahitya Akademi Award winners for works in Sindhi language.

The Sahitya Akademi Award is an annual award given by the Sahitya Akademi (India's National Academy of Letters), to poet and writers in 24 Indian languages. The award was instituted and first awarded in 1955. It carries a monetary reward, of 100,000 Rupees since 2009, and a citation. The list of Sindhi language writers who have won the award is given below.

== Winners ==
Year	Portrait	Author	Work	Category
1959	—	Tirth Basant	Kanwar	Biography
1964	—	Ram Punjwani	Anokha Azmooda	Reminiscences
1966	—	Lekhraj Kishinchand `Aziz'	Surahi	Poetry
1968	—	Kalyan B. Advani	Shah Jo Rasalo (Mujamil)	Evaluation
1969		M. U. Malkani	Sindhi Nasr Ji Tarikh	History of Sindhi prose
1970	—	Narayan `Shyam'	Wari-a-Bharyo Palaand	Poetry
1971	—	Krishin Rahi	Kumach	Poetry
1972	—	Guno Samtaney	Aparajita	Short stories
1973	—	Gobind Malhi	Pyar Ji Pyas	Novel
1974	—	Lal Pushp	Hunaje Atam Jo Maut	Poetry
1976	—	Laxman Bhatia `Komal'	Jee-a-Jharoko	Poetry
1978	—	H.I. Sadarangani	Cheekh	Poetry
1979	—	Hari Daryani `Dilgir'	Pal Pal Jo Parlao (Poetry)	Poetry
1980	—	Krishin Khatwani	Yad Hika Pyar Ji (Novel)	Novel
1981	—	Prabhu `Wafa'	Surkh Gulaab-Suraha Khawaab (Poetry)	Poetry
1982	—	Popati Hiranandani	Munhinji Hayati-a-ja Sona Ropa Warq (Autobiography)	Autobiography
1983	—	Arjan Mirchandani `Shad'	Andho Doonhon (Poetry)	Poetry
1984	—	Mohan Kalpana	Uha Shaam (Short Stories)	Short stories
1985	—	Arjan Hasid	Mero Sij (Poetry)	Poetry
1986		Sundri A. Uttamchandani	Vichoro (Short stories)	Short stories
1987		Harish Vaswani	Chaliha-Chorasi (Literary criticism)	Literary criticism
1988	—	Moti Prakash	Se Sab Sandhyam Saah Sen (Travelogue)	Travelogue
1989	—	M. Kamal	Bahi Ja Warisa (Poetry)	Poetry
1990	—	Goverdhan Mahboobani	Shishe-Ja-Ghar (Poetry)	Poetry
1991	—	Harikant Jethwani	Soche Joon Sooratoon (Poetry)	Poetry
1993	—	Tara Mirchandani	Hathayogi (Novel)	Novel
1994	—	Kala Prakash	Aarsi-A-Aado (Novel)	Novel
1995	—	Hari Motwani	Ajho (Novel)	Novel
1996	—	Lakshmi Khilani	Gufa Je Hun Paar (Short stories)	Short stories
1997	—	Ishwar Anchal	Tandana (Andheri Raat Mein) (Poetry)	Poetry
1998	—	Shyam Jaisinghani	Zalzalo (Plays)	Plays
1999		Vasdev Mohi	Barf Jo Thahiyal (Poetry)	Poetry
2000	—	Param A. Abichandani	Taka Tora (Literary Criticism)	Literary Criticism
2001	—	Prem Prakash	Bhagat (Poetry)	Poetry
2002	—	Hari Himthani	Udamandarh Arman (Short Stories)	Short stories
2003	—	Hiro Thakur	Tahqiq Ain Tanqeed (Essays)	Essays
2004	—	Satish Rohra	Kavita Khan Kavita Tain	Literary Criticism
2005	—	Dholan 'Rahi'	Andhero Roshan Thiye	Poetry
2006	—	Kirat Babani	Dharti - A-Jo-Sad	Plays
2007	—	Vasedev 'Nirmal'	Vijoon Vasan Aayoon (Plays)	Plays
2008	—	Hiro Shewkani	Sirjan Jo Sankat Ain Sindhi Kahani (Criticism)	Criticism
2009	—	Anand Khemani	Rishtan Jee Siyasat (Short Stories)	Short stories
2010	—	Laxman Dubey	Ajan Yaad Aahe (Poetry)	Poetry
2011	—	Mohan Geham	...Ta Khawaban Jo Chha Thindo (Plays)	Plays
2012	—	Indra Vaswani	Miteea Khaan Miteea Taaeen (Short Stories)	Short stories
2013	—	Namdev Tarachandani	Mansh-Nagari (Poetry)	Poetry
2014	—	Gope Kamal	Sija Agyaan Buku (Poetry)	Poetry
2015	—	Maya Rahi	Mahengi Murk (Short Stories)	Short stories
2016	—	Nand Javeri	Akhar Katha (Poetry)	Poetry
2017	—	Jagdish Lachhani	Aachhende Laja Maraan (Essays)	Essays
2018	—	Khiman U Mulani	Jia Mein Taandaa (Poetry)	Poetry
2019	—	Ishwar Moorjani	Jeejal	Short Stories
2020	—	Jetho Lalwani	Jehad	Plays
2021	—	Arjun Chawla	Nena Nindakhra	Poetry
2022	—	Kanhaiyalal Lekhwani	Sindhi Sahit Jo Mukhtasar Itinas	Literary History
2023	—	Vinod Asudani	Hathu Pakidijain	Poetry-Ghazal
2024	—	Hundraj Balwani	Purzo	Short Stories
2025		Bhagwan Atlani	Waghoo	Short Story
