= Toor =

Toor may refer to:

- toor (Unix) a secondary root account
- Pigeon pea, or toor dal
- A branch of the Tomar/Tanwar Dynasty

== People with the surname ==
- Cecil J. Toor (1895–1969), American football coach
- Devinder Toor (born 1967/1968), Canadian politician
- Frances Toor (1890–1956), American author, anthropologist and ethnographer
- Jody Toor, Canadian politician
- Kabir Toor (born 1990), English cricketer
- Krishna Kumar Toor (fl. 2012), Urdu poet
- Salman Toor, Pakistani-born American painter
- Tejinder Pal Singh Toor (born 1994), Indian shot putter
- Yahya Toor (born 1962), Pakistani cricketer

=== van Toor ===
- Aad and Bas van Toor, a former Dutch circus duo called Bassie & Adriaan
- Jacob van Toor (1576–1618), Dutch preacher and theologian

== See also ==
- Tally Toor a tower in Scotland
