= Harish Vaswani =

Sindhi writer, poet and critic

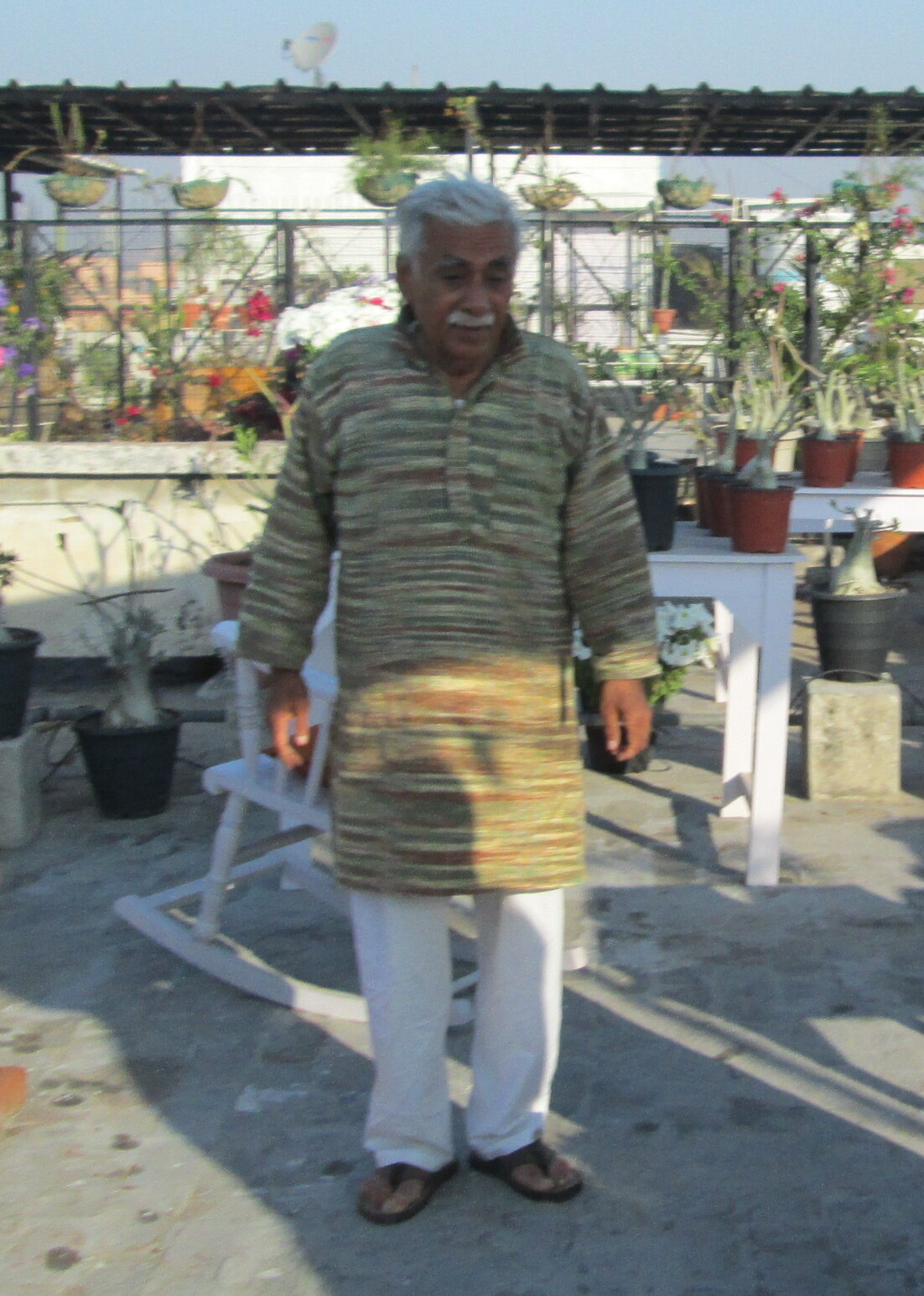
- Vaswani in 2013
- Born: 22 November 1940; Lor Ilaayi, Baluchistan, British India
- Died: 13 April 2013 (aged 72); Noida, NCR, Delhi, India
- Occupations: Poet, writer
- Years active: 1962–1995
- Notable work: 40–84
- Awards: Sahitya Akademi Award (1987)

Harish Hansraj Vaswani (Sindhi:ھريش ھنسراج واسواڻي) (22 November 1940 – 13 April 2013) was a Sindhi writer, poet and critic. and academic. He was a professor of Political Science and English literature. He is known as a pioneer of new Sindhi poetry and he was influential writer of Sindhi literature. He was awarded Sahitya Akademi award in 1987.

== Life ==
Harish Vaswani was born in November 1940 in Lor Ilaayi in hill area of Baluchistan (now in Pakistan) to Vaswani family. His family, with his four siblings, fled to India after the Partition of India in 1947. They reached Saurashtra State (now part of Gujarat) by sea as refugees. They faced numerous hardships and had to live in refugee camps. His school education was frequently interrupted as the family moved from one town to another until it settled temporarily in Bantwa in Saurashtra.

Vaswani received three post graduate degrees in English, Political Science and Hindi; each as a correspondence student of Aligarh Muslim University. While studying, he worked as a tutor to undergraduate students to sustain himself while living with a relative in old Delhi’s Daryaganj area.

In his mid twenties, Vaswani moved to Adipur, Kutch and joined the Tolani College of Arts & Science as a lecturer. Subsequently, he was elevated to the post of Head of the Department of Political Science. He also taught English literature until his retirement.

Influenced by French philosopher-thinkers like Albert Camus and Jean-Paul Sartre, he was an atheist who debated religious faith, the political establishment and conformist attitudes. His literary writings are filled with metaphors around the complex narrative and ironies of human existence and the pain of partition, which, like most other Sindhi writers of his generation. He became an avid reader and follower of Buddhism and of psychoanalysis in his later life and briefly took to becoming a Buddhist counselor for a brief period after his retirement. These later influences turned him into a melancholic loner, who stopped writing in 1995, after publicly declaring this intent through his column in Sindhi magazine Rachana. He distanced himself from social engagements in the pursuit of worldly renunciation. He continued visiting Dharamshala in Himachal Pradesh in religious pursuits.

He had also served as a member of Sindhi Advisory Board, Sahitya Akademi, Delhi.

He died on 13 April 2013, in Noida, NCR, Delhi.

== Works ==
=== Style ===
Harish Vaswani's writing style was incisive, reflective, and ponderous and filled with psychological undertones. He diverted from the conventional poetry writing and literary analysis thus he is considered as the pioneer of New Sindhi Poetry (Naeen Sindhi Kavita). He is considered as a modernist poet.

=== Works ===
40-76 (Chalih Chhahattar, 1976) is an anthology of poems selected by Prem Prakash. 40-80 (Chalih Assi, 1980) is his collection of short stories selected by Hari Motwani. 40-84 (Chalih Chourasi, 1984) is a collection of criticism selected by Namdev Tarachandani. his other works are Azadai-a Khan Poy Sindhi Kahani, Biyo Dafo, Danh, Mout, Purush Veshya, Vado Shahr and Hik Zazbe Jo Mout. 0:000 (2001) is a literary collection of poems, articles, travelogue on Kutch and critical essays selected by Hari Motwani. Dhara (2015, posthumous) is a compilation of literary columns written by Harish Vaswani which were published over the years in Sindhi magazine Rachana.

He edited Sindhi Tanqueed (1985), a collection of selected critical essays. He also co-edited Choonda Sindhi Kahaniyoon (1980), a collection of selected short stories. He also edited Shabda ain Sanskriti (1982) and Shaair Shyam.

He translated Jhaverchand Meghani's Gujarati classic Mansaina Deeva as Insaniyat Ja Deep in 1987.

Journalism

Harish Vaswani wrote weekly columns for Gujarati daily Kutch Mitra for years and covered a range of different subjects. His column titled Sanskar Sindhu was about cultural, literary and society issues relating to Sindhis in post partition India. Samvaay was a column of general interest where he wrote about current affairs, political concerns on the global-local stage and popular subjects. Manch was about interpersonal relationships, society and trends, influences of art and literature on life; it was a series of freewheeling commentary pieces on contemporary urban life in juxtaposition and sometimes at loggerheads with the times past. Vaswani's Buddhist leanings had begun to reflect amply in his writings this column. Manovigyanni Drishtithi was about a psychology. He explored intimate relationships, struggles of a society at war with itself, personality issues, Buddhist philosophical thought and psychology, new findings and writings on science of brain.

== Awards ==
He was awarded Sahitya Akademi Award for Sindhi writers in 1987 for his work on criticism, 40–84.

== Personal life ==
In 1966, he married Indira Vaswani, a school teacher who had also migrated as a child with her family from the Larkana district of Sindh during the Partition. She went on to become a Sindhi writer and was also awarded the Sahitya Akademi award posthumously in 2012, two months after her death. The Vaswanis has a daughter; Shefalee Vasudev, an English language journalist and author.
