= List of Sahitya Akademi Award winners for Odia =

List of winners of a literary honor in India

Sahitya Akademi Award for Odia
- Award for contributions to Odia literature
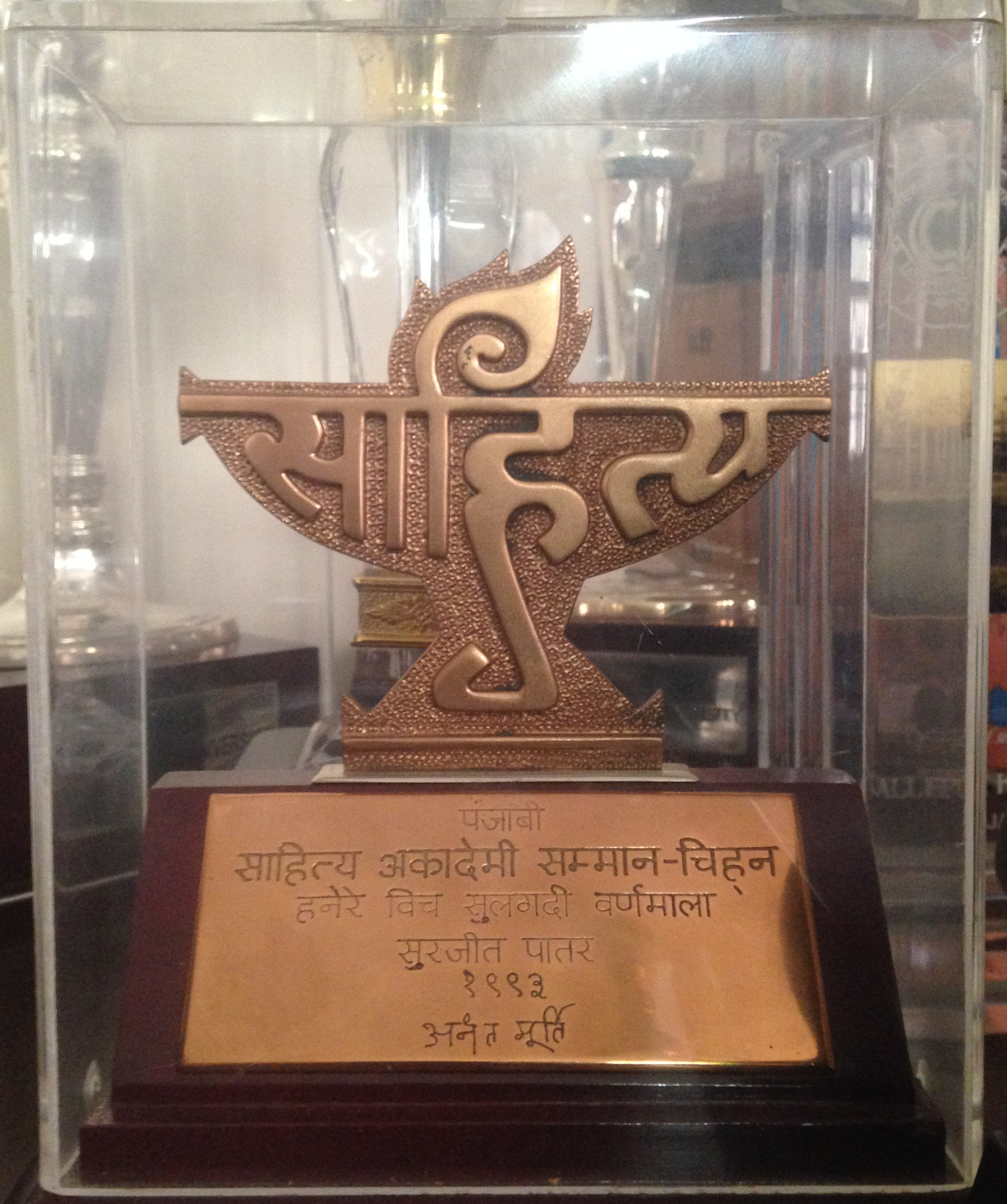
- Awarded for: Literary award in India
- Sponsored by: Sahitya Akademi, Government of India
- Reward: ₹1 lakh (US$1,100)
- First award: 1955
- Final award: 2024

Highlights
- First winner: Gopinath Mohanty
- Most Recent winner: Baishnab Charan Samal
- Total awarded: 64
- Website: Official website

Part of a series on

Sahitya Akademi Awards
Category
Sahitya Akademi Award winners by language
- Assamese
- Bengali
- Bodo
- Dogri
- English
- Gujarati
- Hindi
- Kannada
- Kashmiri
- Konkani
- Maithili
- Malayalam
- Marathi
- Meitei (Manipuri)
- Nepali
- Odia
- Punjabi
- Rajasthani
- Sanskrit
- Santali
- Sindhi
- Tamil
- Telugu
- Urdu
Sahitya Akademi Translation Prizes
- Assamese
- Bengali
- Bodo
- Dogri
- English
- Gujarati
- Hindi
- Kannada
- Kashmiri
- Konkani
- Maithili
- Malayalam
- Marathi
- Meitei (Manipuri)
- Nepali
- Odia
- Punjabi
- Rajasthani
- Sanskrit
- Santali
- Sindhi
- Tamil
- Telugu
- Urdu
Sahitya Akademi Yuva Puraskar
- Assamese
- Bengali
- Bodo
- Dogri
- English
- Gujarati
- Hindi
- Kannada
- Kashmiri
- Konkani
- Maithili
- Malayalam
- Meitei (Manipuri)
- Marathi
- Nepali
- Odia
- Punjabi
- Rajasthani
- Sanskrit
- Santali
- Sindhi
- Tamil
- Telugu
- Urdu
Sahitya Akademi Bal Sahitya Puraskar
- Assamese
- Bengali
- Bodo
- Dogri
- English
- Gujarati
- Hindi
- Kannada
- Kashmiri
- Konkani
- Maithili
- Malayalam
- Meitei (Manipuri)
- Marathi
- Nepali
- Odia
- Punjabi
- Rajasthani
- Sanskrit
- Santali
- Sindhi
- Tamil
- Telugu
- Urdu
Related
- Eighth Schedule to the Constitution of India
- Official Languages Commission
- List of languages by number of native speakers in India

The Sahitya Akademi Award is given by the Sahitya Akademi, India's national academy of letters, to one writer every year for contribution to Odia language. No awards were given in 1956, 1957, 1959, 1960, 1962 and 1968.

== Sahitya Akademi Award winners ==
The following is a list of winners of the Sahitya Akademi Award for writings in the Odia language:

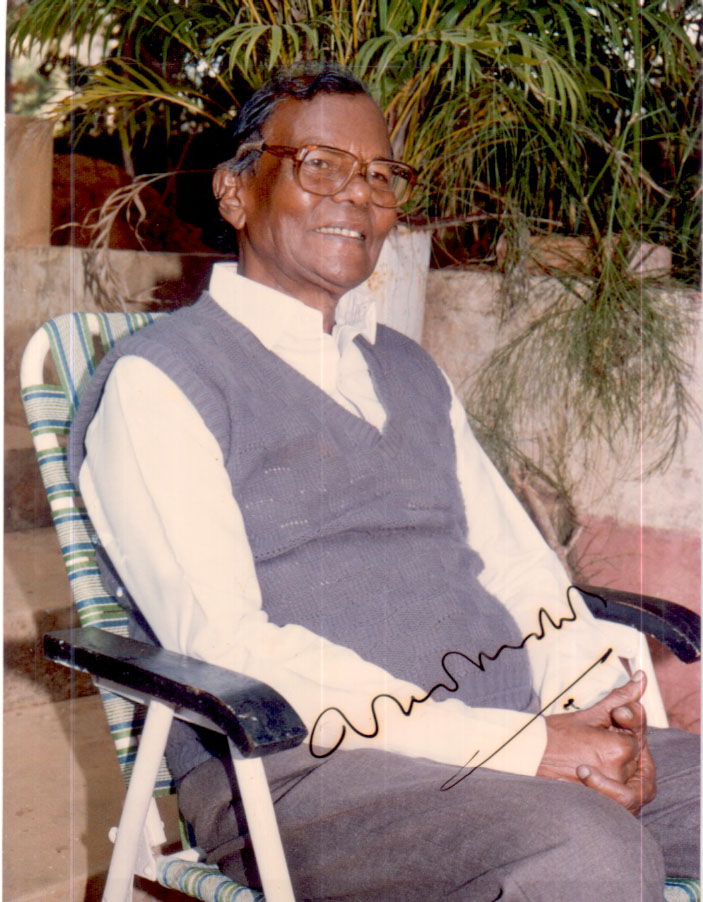
Gopinath Mohanty was the first winner of this award.

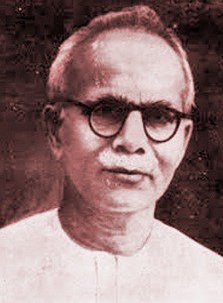
Godabarish Misra was the first posthumous winner of this award.

Key
†	Denotes posthumous recipients

Year	Author	Book	Category of Book
1955	Gopinath Mohanty	Amrutara Santana	Novel
1958	Kanhu Charan Mohanty	Ka	Novel
1961	Godabarish Misra †	Ardhasatabdir Odisa O Tanhire Mo Sthan	Autobiography
1962	Sachidananda Routray	Kabita-1962	Poetry
1964	Nilakantha Das	Atmajibani	Autobiography
1965	Baikunthanath Patnaik	Uttarayana	Poetry
1966	Godabarish Mohapatra †	Banka O Sidha	Poetry
1967	Suryanarayan Das	Odia Sahityara Itihas	History of Literature
1969	Surendra Mohanty	Nila Saila	Novel
1970	Binod Chandra Nayak	Sarisrupa	Poetry
1971	Manoranjan Das	Aranya Fasal	Play
1972	Manoj Das	Manojdasanka Katha O Kahini	Short Stories
1973	Guru Prasad Mohanty	Samudra Snana	Poetry
1974	Sitakanta Mohapatra	Sabdara Akash	Poetry
1975	Radha Mohan Gadanayak	Surya O Andhakar	Poetry
1976	Kishori Charan Das	Thakura Ghara	Short Stories
1977	Kalicharan Patnaik	Kumbhara Chaka	Autobiography
1978	Ramakanta Rath	Saptama Ritu	Poetry
1979	Kunjabihari Das	Mo Kahani	Autobiography
1980	Ananta Patnaik	Abantar	Poetry
1981	Akhilmohan Patnaik	O Andhagali	Short Stories
1982	Gopal Chhotray	Hasyarasar Natak	One-act Plays
1983	Harekrushna Mahatab	Gan Majlis (Vol. Ill)	Essays
1984	Mohapatra Nilamani Sahoo	Abhisapta Gandharba	Short Stories
1985	Rajendra Kishore Panda	Saila Kalpa	Poetry
1986	Soubhagya Kumar Misra	Dwa Suparna	Poetry
1987	Nityananda Mohapatra	Gharadiha	Novel
1988	Sourindra Barik	Akash Pari Nibida	Poetry
1989	Bhanuji Rao	Nai Aarapari	Poetry
1990	Beenapani Mohanty	Patadei	Short Stories
1991	Jagannath Prasad Das	Ahnika	Poetry
1992	Rabi Pattnayak †	Bichitra Barna	Short Stories
1993	Santanu Kumar Acharya	Chalanti Thakura	Short Stories
1994	Guru Charan Patnaik	Jagata Darshanare Jagannatha	Cultural Study
1995	Govind Chandra Udgata	Kavyasilpi Gangadhara	Criticism
1996	Satyanarayana Rajguru	Mo Jeevana Sangrama	Autobiography
1997	Chandrasekhar Rath	Sabutharu Dirgharati	Short Stories
1998	Chittaranjan Das	Biswaku Gabakhya	Criticism
1999	Haraprasad Das	Garbhagriha	Poetry
2000	Pratibha Ray	Ullanghan	Short Stories
2001	Pratibha Satpathy	Tanmaya Dhuli	Poetry
2002	Sarat Kumar Mohanty	Gandhi Manisha	Biography
2003	Jatindra Mohan Mohanty	Suryasnata	Criticism
2004	Prafulla Kumar Mohanty	Bharatiya Sanskruti O Bhagwadgita	Essays
2005	Ramachandra Behera	Gopapura	Short Stories
2006	Bansidhar Sarangi	Swarodaya	Poetry
2007	Deepak Mishra	Sukha Sanhita	Poetry
2008	Pramod Kumar Mohanty	Asaranti Anasara	Poetry
2009	Phani Mohanty	Mrugaya	Poetry
2010	Pathani Pattnaik	Jibanara Chalapathe	Autobiography
2011	Kalpanakumari Devi	Achihna Basabhumi	Novel
2012	Gourahari Das	Kanta O' Anyanya Galpa	Short Stories
2013	Bijay Mishra	Banaprastha	Play
2014	Gopal Rath	Bipula Diganta	Poetry
2015	Bibhuti Patnaik	Mahisashurara Muhan	Short Stories
2016	Paramita Satpathy	Prapti	Short Stories
2017	Gayatri Saraf	Etavatira Shilpi	Short Stories
2018	Dasarathi Das	Prasanga Puruna Bhabana Nua	Literary Essays
2019	Tarun Kanti Mishra	Bhaswati	Short Stories
2020	Yashodhara Mishra	Samudrakula Ghara	Short stories
2021	Hrushikesh Mallick	Sarijaithiba Apera	Poetry
2022	Gayatribala Panda	Dayanadi	Poetry
2024	Ashutosh Parida	Aprastuta Mrutyu	Poetry
2024	Baishnab Charan Samal	Bhuti Bhakti Bibhuti	Essays
2025	Girijakumar Baliyar Singh	Padapurana	Poetry

== Sahitya Akademi Bal Sahitya Puraskar Winners ==
The following is a list of winners of the Sahitya Akademi Bal Sahitya Puraskar:

Key
†	Denotes posthumous recipients

Year	Author	Book/Contribution
2010	Punyaprbha Devi	Kuni Goinda (Short Stories)
2011	Maheswar Mohanty	Total Contribution To Children Literature
2012	Ram Prasad Mohanty †	Total Contribution To Children Literature
2013	Nadiya Bihari Mohanty	Total Contribution To Children Literature
2014	Dash Benhur (Jitendra Narayan Dash)	Total Contribution To Children Literature
2015	Snehalata Mohanty	Total Contribution to Children Literature
2016	Batakrushna Ojha	Total Contribution to Children Literature
2017	Subhendra Mohan Srichandan Singh	Total Contribution to Children Literature
2018	Birendra Mohanty	Rumku Jhuma (Poetry)
2019	Birendra Kumar Samantray	Total Contribution
2020	Ramachandra Nayak	Bana Deula Re Suna Neula (Stories)
2021	Digaraj Brahma	Geeta Kahe Mitar Katha (Poetry)
2022	Narendra Prasad Das	Kolahala Na Halahala (Short Stories)

== Akademi Yuva Puraskar Winners ==
The following is a list of winners of the Akademi Yuva Puraskar:

Year	Author	Book	Category
2011	Gayatribala Panda	Gaan	Poetry
2012	Srushthishree Naik	Bhirna Upabana	Short Stories
2013	Kshetrabasi Naik	Dadan	Short Stories
2014	Narendra Kumar Bhoi	Pidaparba	Poetry
2015	Sujit Kumar Panda	Manasanka	Short Stories
2016	Jnanee Debasish Mishra	Daaga	Poetry
2017	Suryasnata Tripathy	E Sampark Emiti	Poetry
2018	Jayadratha Suna	Sosa	Poetry
2019	Sisira Behera	Bimugdha Uccharana	Literary Criticism
2020	Chandrasekhar Hota	Chetanara Anwesana	Essays
2021	Debabrata Das	Sparsha O Anyanya Galpa	Short Stories
2022	Dillip Behera	Lanthan	Short Stories

== See also ==
- List of Sahitya Akademi Translation Prize winners for Odia
