= List of Sahitya Akademi Award winners for Urdu =

List of winners of a literary honor in India

Sahitya Akademi Award for Urdu
- Award for contributions to Urdu literature
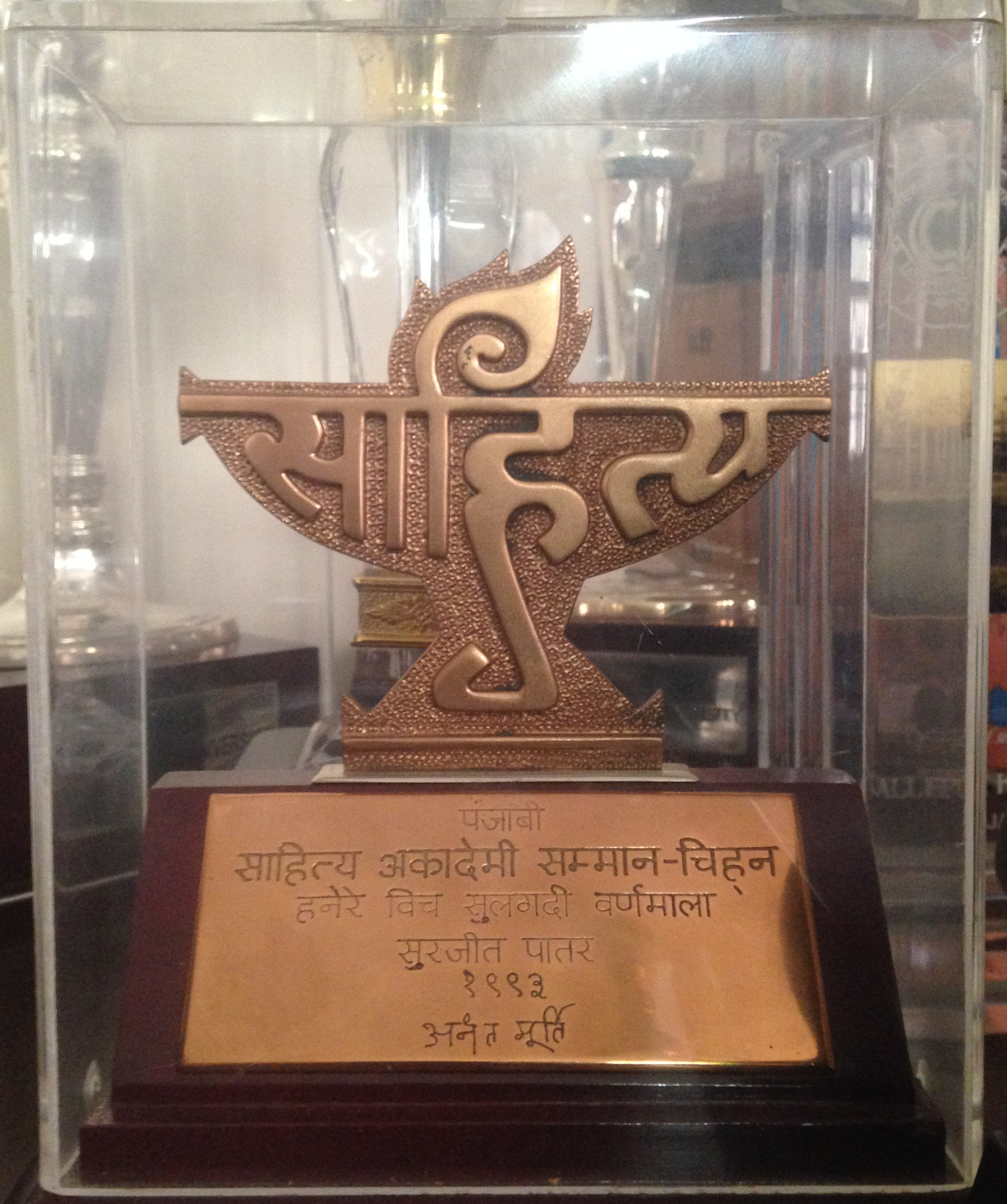
- Awarded for: Literary award in India
- Sponsored by: Sahitya Akademi, Government of India
- Reward: ₹1 lakh (US$1,100)
- First award: 1955
- Final award: 2023

Highlights
- Total awarded: 63
- First winner: Zafar Hussain Khan
- Most Recent winner: Sadiqua Nawab Saher
- Website: Official website

Part of a series on

Sahitya Akademi Awards
Category
Sahitya Akademi Award winners by language
- Assamese
- Bengali
- Bodo
- Dogri
- English
- Gujarati
- Hindi
- Kannada
- Kashmiri
- Konkani
- Maithili
- Malayalam
- Marathi
- Meitei (Manipuri)
- Nepali
- Odia
- Punjabi
- Rajasthani
- Sanskrit
- Santali
- Sindhi
- Tamil
- Telugu
- Urdu
Sahitya Akademi Translation Prizes
- Assamese
- Bengali
- Bodo
- Dogri
- English
- Gujarati
- Hindi
- Kannada
- Kashmiri
- Konkani
- Maithili
- Malayalam
- Marathi
- Meitei (Manipuri)
- Nepali
- Odia
- Punjabi
- Rajasthani
- Sanskrit
- Santali
- Sindhi
- Tamil
- Telugu
- Urdu
Sahitya Akademi Yuva Puraskar
- Assamese
- Bengali
- Bodo
- Dogri
- English
- Gujarati
- Hindi
- Kannada
- Kashmiri
- Konkani
- Maithili
- Malayalam
- Meitei (Manipuri)
- Marathi
- Nepali
- Odia
- Punjabi
- Rajasthani
- Sanskrit
- Santali
- Sindhi
- Tamil
- Telugu
- Urdu
Sahitya Akademi Bal Sahitya Puraskar
- Assamese
- Bengali
- Bodo
- Dogri
- English
- Gujarati
- Hindi
- Kannada
- Kashmiri
- Konkani
- Maithili
- Malayalam
- Meitei (Manipuri)
- Marathi
- Nepali
- Odia
- Punjabi
- Rajasthani
- Sanskrit
- Santali
- Sindhi
- Tamil
- Telugu
- Urdu
Related
- Eighth Schedule to the Constitution of India
- Official Languages Commission
- List of languages by number of native speakers in India

Sahitya Akademi Award is a literary honour that has been given annually since 1955, by Sahitya Akademi (India's National Academy of Letters), to poet and writers for their outstanding contribution to the upliftment of Indian literature. Urdu is one of 24 languages in which the award is given.

== Recipients ==
Year	Portrait	Author	Title	
1955	—	Zafar Hussain Khan	Maal aur Mashiyat (Philosophical treatise)	Philosophical Treatise
1956	—	S. Abid Hussain	Qaumi Tehzib Ka Masala (A survey of Indian culture)	Survey of Indian Culture
1957	—	K. A. Faruqui	Mir Taqi Mir (Literary criticism)	Literary Criticism
1958		Jigar Moradabadi	Atish-i-Gul (Poetry)	Poetry
1959	—	Masud Hassan Rizvi	Urdu Drama aur Stage (History of Urdu drama and stage)	History of Urdu Drama and Stage
1960		Firaq Gorakhpuri	Gul-i-Naghma (Poetry)	Poetry
1961	—	Imtiaz Ali 'Arshi'	Diwan-i-Ghalib (A critical edition of Ghalib's poetry)	A critical edition of Ghalib's poetry
1962	—	Akhtar ul Iman	Yadein (Poetry)	Poetry
1963	—	Khwaja Ghulam Saiyidain	Aandhi Mein Chiragh (Sketches)	Sketches
1964	—	Anand Narain Mulla	Meri Hadis-e-Umr-e-Gurezan (Poetry)	Poetry
1965		Rajinder Singh Bedi	Ek Chadar Maili Si (Novelette)	Novelette
1967	—	Qurratulain Hyder	Patjhar Ki Awaz (Short stories)	Short Stories
1969	—	Makhdum Mohiuddin	Bisat-Raqs (Poetry)	Poetry
1970	—	Hayatullah Ansari	Lahoo Ke Phool (Novel)	Novel
1971	—	Rasheed Ahmad Siddiqui	Ghalib ki Shakhsiyat aur Shairi (Literary criticism)	Literary criticism
1974	—	Ale Ahmed Suroor	Nazar aur Nazariya (Literary criticism)	Literature criticism
1975		Kaifi Azmi	Awara Sajde (Poetry)	Poetry
1976	—	Jan Nisar Akhtar	Khak-e-Dil (Poetry)	Poetry
1978	—	Yousuf Hussain Khan	Hafiz aur Iqbal (Criticism)	Criticism
1979	—	Gulam Rabbani Taban	Nawa-e-Awara (Poetry)	Poetry
1980	—	Asloob Ahmad Ansari	Iqbal Ki Terah Nazmen (Literary criticism)	Literary Criticism
1982	—	Gyan Chand Jain	Zikr-O-Fikr (Literary criticism)	Literary Criticism
1983		Malik Ram	Tazkirah-e-Muasireen (4th Play) (Biography)	Biography
1984	—	Masud Husain Khan	Iqbal Ki Nazari-o-Amali Sheriyat (Criticism)	Criticism
1985	—	Balraj Komal	Parindon Bhara Asmaan (Poetry)	Poetry
1986		Shamsur Rahman Faruqi	Tanquidi Afkar (Literary criticism)	Literature criticism
1987	—	A. M. K. Shahryar	Khwab Ka Dar Band Hai (Poetry)	Poetry
1988		Sheikh Abdullah	Aatish-e-Chinar (Autobiography)	Autobiography
1989	—	Surendra Prakash	Baaz Goyi (Short stories)	Short stories
1990	—	Abdus Samad	Do Gaz Zameen (Novel)	Novel
1991	—	Salahuddin Parvez	Identity Card (Novel)	Novel
1992	—	Mohammad Alvi	Chautha Aasmaan (Poetry)	Poetry
1993	—	Ram Lall	Pakheru (Short stories)	Short stories
1994	—	Mazhar Imam	Pichhle Mausam Ka Phool (Poetry)	Poetry
1995		Gopi Chand Narang	Sakhtiyat, Pas-Sakhtiyat Aur Mashriqi Sheriyat (Literary criticism)	Literary criticism
1996	—	Ilyas Ahmad Gaddi	Fire Area (Novel)	Novel
1997	—	Gian Singh Shatir	Gian Singh Shatir (Novel)	Novel
1998		Nida Fazli	Khoya Hua Sa Kuch (Poetry)	Poetry
1999	—	Bashir Badr	Aas (Poetry)	Poetry
2000	—	Mohd. Idrees Ambar Bahraichi	Sookhi Tahni Par Hariyal (Poetry)	Poetry
2001		Naiyer Masud	Taoos Chaman Ki Maina (Short stories)	Short stories
2002		Gulzar	Dhuan (Short stories)	Short stories
2003		Syed Muhammad Ashraf	Baad-E-Saba Ka Intizar (Short Stories)	Short stories
2004	—	Salam Bin Razzaq	Shikasta Buton Ke Darmiyan (Short Stories)	Short stories
2005	—	Jabir Husain	Ret Per Khema (Memoirs)	Memoirs
2006	—	Makhmoor Saeedi	Rasta Aur Main (Poetry)	Poetry
2007	—	Wahab Ashrafi	Tareekh-e-Adab-e-Urdu (Criticism)	Criticism
2008	—	Jayant Parmer	Pencil Aur Doosri Nazmein (Poetry) (Poetry)	Poetry
2009	—	Abul Kalam Qasmi	Maasir Tanqidi Rawayyay (criticism)	Criticism
2010		Sheen Kaaf Nizam	Gumshuda Dair ki Ghantiyan (poetry)	Poetry
2011		Khaleel Mamoon	Aafaaq Ki Taraf (Poetry)	Poetry
2012	—	Krishna Kumar Toor	Ghurfa-i-Ghalib (Poetry)	Poetry
2013		Javed Akhtar	Lava (Poetry)	Poetry
2014		Munawwar Rana	Shahdaba (Poetry)	Poetry
2015	—	Shamim Tariq	Tasawwuf aur Bhakti (Criticism)	Criticism
2016	—	Nizam Siddiqui	Mabad-e-Jadidiat Se Naye Ahed Ki Takhliqiyat Tak (Criticism)	Criticism
2017	—	Mohammed Baig Ehsas	Dukhma (Short story)	Short story
2018	—	Rahman Abbas	Rohzin (Novel)	Novel
2019	—	Shafey Kidwai	Sawaneh-e-Sir Syed: Ek Bazdeed (Biography)	Biography
2020		Hussain Ul Haque	Amawas Mein Khwab (Novel)	Novel
2021	—	Chander Bhan Khayal	Taza Hawa Ki Tabishen (Poetry)	Poetry
2022	—	Anis Ashfaq	Khwab Saraab (Novel)	Novel
2023	—	Sadiqua Nawab Saher	Rajdev Ki Amrai (Novel)	Novel
2025		Pritpal Singh Betab	Safar Jaari Hai	Poetry
