= Gangadhar National Award For Poetry =

National Literary Award

- Awarded for: Significant contribution in the field of Literature (poetry).
- Date: Foundation day of Sambalpur University
- Location: Sambalpur University, Odisha
- Country: India
- Presented by: Sambalpur University
- Rewards: Cash prize of Rs 1,00,000, angavastra, citation, a memento and a copy of Gangadhar Meher: Selected Works (An anthology of Gangadhar Meher's Poetry in English translation)
- First award: 1991
- Final award: 2021

Highlights
- First winner: Ali Sardar Jafri (1991)
- Latest winner: Pratibha Satpathy (2025)
- Total awarded: 33

Gangadhar National Award For Poetry is a literary award given in the field of literature for poetry by Sambalpur University. It is named after Gangadhar Meher. First award was given to Ali Sardar Jafri in the year 1991. 33 poets have been awarded on various Indian languages until now.

== History ==
The award was first given in 1991 but the procedure of giving the award was started in 1989.

== Procedure ==
There is a delay of one year due to a long process of choosing an awardee; if the awardee won the prize for 2019 then he gets his award in 2021, and the award of 2017 was given in 2019. It is awarded on the celebration day of Sambalpur University Foundation Day, which is celebrated every year in January.

Cash prize of Rs 1,00,000, angavastra, citation, a memento and a copy of Gangadhar Meher: Selected Works (An anthology of Gangadhar Meher's Poetry in English translation) is given to receipt of Gangadhar National Award.

== Awardees ==
| Year of award announced | Name of the awardee (with year of award given) (Note: The award is given every year on the 1st week of January on the foundation day of Sambalpur University) | Language | Foundation day |
|---|---|---|---|
| 1991 | Ali Sardar Jafri (1993) | Urdu | 26th |
| 1992 | Nabakanta Barua (1994) | Assamese | 27th |
| 1993 | Shakti Chattopadhyay (1995) | Bengali | 28th |
| 1994 | Jayanta Mahapatra (1996) | English/Odia | 29th |
| 1995 | Kedarnath Singh (1997) | Hindi | 30th |
| 1996 | Ayyappa Paniker (1998) | Malayalam | 31st |
| 1997 | Sitakant Mahapatra (1999) | Odia | 32nd |
| 1998 | Nirupama Kaur (2000) | Punjabi | 33rd |
| 1999 | Vinda Karandikar (2001) | Marathi | 34th |
| 2000 | Ramakanta Rath (2002) | Odia | 35th |
| 2001 | K. Satchidanandan (2003) | Malayalam | 36th |
| 2002 | Shankha Ghosh (2004) | Bengali | 37th |
| 2003 | Sitanshu Yashaschandra (2005) | Gujarati | 38th |
| 2004 | Dilip Chitre (2006) | Marathi | 39th |
| 2005 | Gulzar (2007) | Urdu | 40th |
| 2006 | Nilmani Phookan Jr (2008) | Assamese | 41st |
| 2007 | Haraprasad Das (2009) | Odia | 42nd |
| 2008 | Akhlaq Mohammed Khan (2010) | Urdu | 43rd |
| 2009 | Surjit Patar (2011) | Punjabi | 44th |
| 2010 | Rajendra Kishore Panda (2012) | Odia | 45th |
| 2011 | Balraj Komal (2013) | Urdu | 46th |
| 2012 | Vasdev Mohi (2014) | Sindhi | 47th |
| 2013 | Soubhagya Kumar Misra (2015) | Odia | 48th |
| 2014 | Subodh Sarkar (2016) | Bengali | 49th |
| 2015 | Leeladhar Jagudi (2017) | Hindi | 50th |
| 2016 | K Siva Reddy (2018) | Telugu | 51st |
| 2017 | Chandrashekhara Kambara (2019) | Kannada | 52nd |
| 2018 | Vishwanath Prasad Tiwari (2020) | Hindi | 53rd |
| 2019 | Sheen Kaaf Nizam (2021) | Urdu | 54th |
| 2020 | Kamal Vora (2022) | Gujarati | 55th |
| 2021 | K. G. Sankara Pillai (2023) | Malayalam | 56th |
| 2022 | Anis Uz Zaman (2024) | Assamese | 57th |
| 2023 | Pratibha Satpathy (2025) | Odia | 58th |
