= Diwan-e-Ghalib =

Book by Ghalib

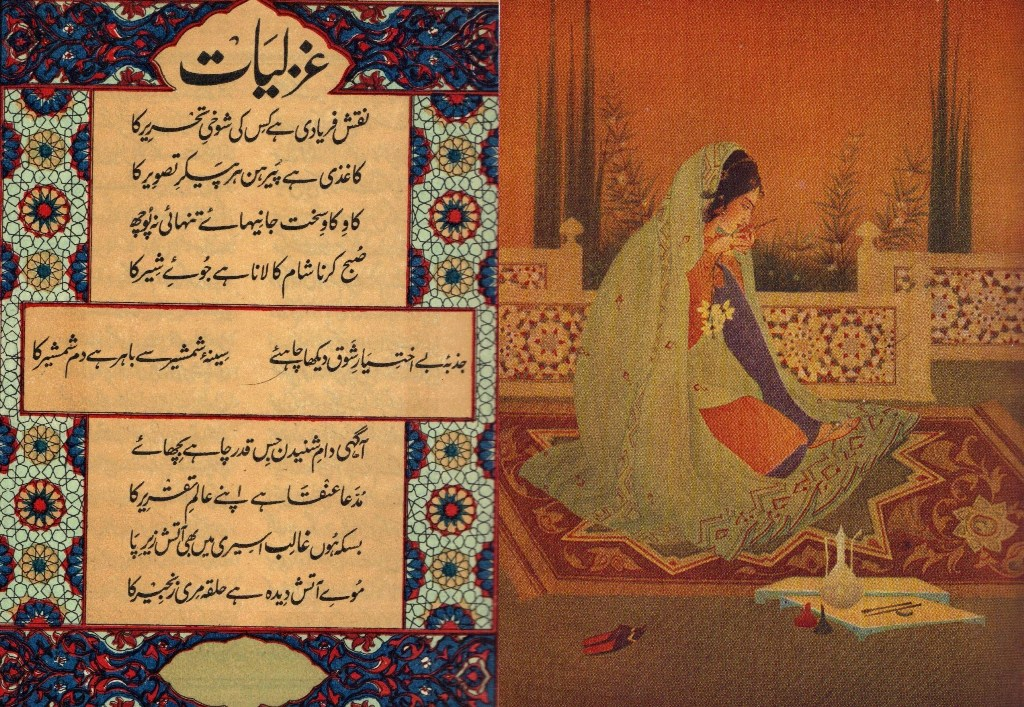
- Cover of Diwan-e-Ghalib.
- Author: Mirza Asadullah Khan Ghalib
- Language: Urdu; Persian
- Genre: Poetry, ghazal, shayari, diwan
- Publication place: India

Diwan-e-Ghalib is a poetry book written by the India born Persian and also Urdu poet Mirza Asadullah Khan Ghalib. It is a collection of the ghazals of Ghalib. Though it does not include all of his ghazals as he was too choosy to include them all, still in many other copies of the Diwan Urdu scholars have tried to collect all of his precious works. Several editions of the Diwan exist such as the Nuskha-e Nizami, Nuskha-e Arshi by Imtiaz Ali 'Arshi', Nuskha-e-Hamidiya (Bhopal), Nuskha az Ghulam rasool Mehr.

== Synopsis ==
Diwan-e-Ghalib includes around 200 ghazals and the original copy had fewer ghazals than this. The researchers included other ghazals, as and when found, after the death of Ghalib. The ghazals are written in Rekhta the then spoken Urdu language.
