= Shamim Tariq =

Shamim Tariq (born 1952 in Varanasi) is an Indian scholar and columnist. He was the Director of the Karimi Library at Anjuman-i-Islam, Mumbai. He resigned from the post in 2019. His philosophical treatise Tasawwuf aur Bhakti, analyzing the principles of Sufi thought and Vedanta won the 2015 Sahitya Akademi Award for Urdu. The work describes commonalities between the two traditions and their message of compassion, justice, peace and brotherhood. His speeches can be heard on his YT Channel.
