= Vasdev Mohi =

Sindhi poet and writer (1944–2021)

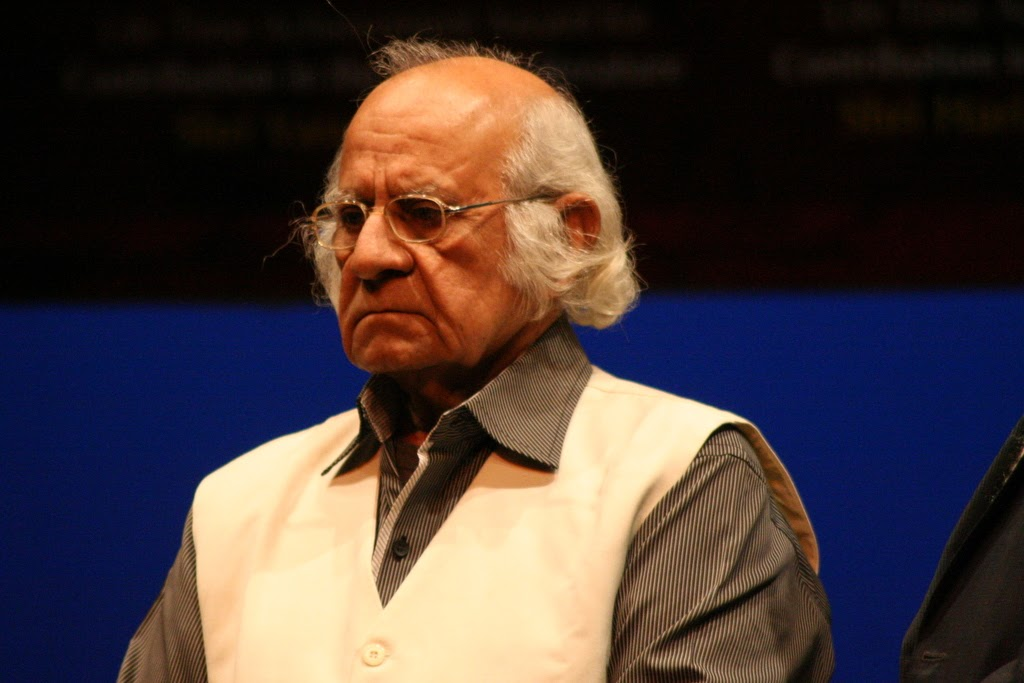
- Born: Vasdev Vensimal Sidhnani; 2 March 1944; Mirpur Khas, British India
- Died: 27 August 2021 (aged 77)
- Education: Master's; English literature
- Alma mater: Gujarat University
- Occupations: Poet; Translator; Critic; Short story writer
- Spouse: Janki (m. 1964)
- Writing career
- Pen name: Vasdev Mohi
- Language: Sindhi
- Years active: 1976–present
- Genres: Ghazal; Prose; Criticism; Short story; Essay; Play
- Subjects: Social, Literature
- Notable awards: Saraswati Samman; Sahitya Akademi Award (2); Gangadhar National Award
- Website: vasdevmohi.com

Vasdev Mohi (born Vasdev Vensimal Sidhnani; 2 March 1944 – 27 August 2021) was a Sindhi poet, translator, critic, short story writer and a retired lecturer. He also served as the member of the executive board of Sahitya Akademi and member of Council for Promotion of Indian Languages, collectively from 2008 to 2013. His work include twenty-five books of poetry, uncertain translation and critic works. The recipient of numerous awards, including Saraswati Samman for his short story book titled Chequebook published in 2012, some of his uncertain critical essays have appeared in literary festivals held in national and international seminars.

His first poetic collection titled Tazad became one of prominent poems in both India and Pakistan. He later published another poem titled Subah Kithe Ahe (Where is the Morning). In 1977, he was awarded Sahitya Akademi Award in Sindhi for his poem Barf jo Thahyal.

Mohi died on 27 August 2021, at the age of 77.

== Early life and education ==
He was born on March 2, 1944, in Mirpur Khas, British India (in modern-day Pakistan). Following the partition of the Indian subcontinent, his family migrated to Jodhpur in 1947. They later moved to Ahmedabad in 1950. He married Janki in November 1964. He did his master's degree in English literature from the Gujarat University and joined Life Insurance Corporation (LIC) in 1966. He later went to UAE and started teaching English at The Indian High School, Dubai in 1987 until he retired in 2004 as the lecturer. Prior to his retirement, he also served as the head of English department.

== Career ==
He started his career around 1976 when he published his first poetry Tazad. In 1979, he appeared in All India Radio's symposium. He has been engaged in various writing genres such as criticism, playwright, short stories and poem in particular. He introduced new form of poetries such as Mankoo, a type of traditional poetry usually written to express author's anguish against social discrimination which was awarded Gujarati Sahitya Akademi Award in 1995. He also introduced another form of ghazal called Hyku Ghazal, which uses Japanese language combination alongside Sindhi language.
