= Gayatribala Panda =

Indian poet (b. 1977)

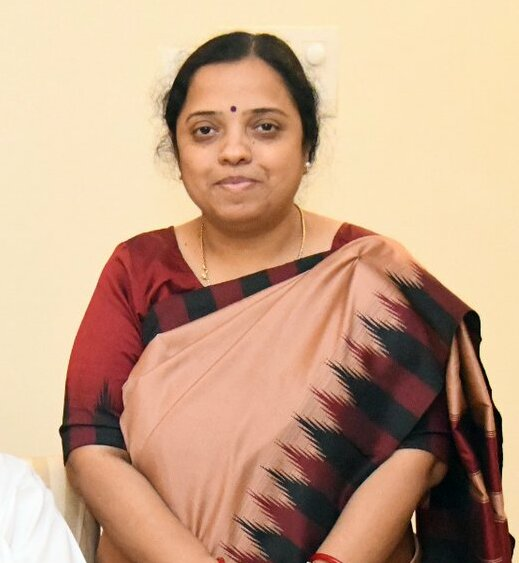
- Born: 17 April 1977 (age 49); Odisha, India
- Occupations: Poet, writer
- Writing career
- Language: Odia
- Notable awards: Sahitya Akademi Award (2022)

Gayatribala Panda (born 17 April 1977) is an Indian poet, fiction writer and journalist from Bhubaneswar, Odisha, India.

== Life ==
Panda started composing poems at the age of eight and her first poem was published at the age of 12. She studied library and information science from Utkal University and emerged as a topper. Later, she studied journalism from the Indian Institute of Mass Communication, Dhenkenal.

She is the editor of Anyaa, an Odia literary magazine. In 2011, she won Kendriya Sahitya Akademi Yuva Puraskar. In 2015, she was chosen for the 'Writers in-residence' programme, along with Bikram Sampath, at the Rashtrapati Bhavan. In 2021 she was chosen for the Times Power Women. In 2022, she received Sahitya Akademi Award winners for Odia for her poetry Dayanadi.

== Works ==
=== Poetry ===
- Ahata Pratisruti (Hurt promises)
- Aspasta Ishwar (Vague god)
- Anayatta (Uncontrolled)
- Gaan (Village)
- Jetiki Dishuchi Akasha (The sky you can see)
- Akhi Nain Kana Nain (No Eye No Ear)
- E Ratira Jete Tara (The Stars of this Sky)
- Bagha (Tiger)
- Dayanadi (River Daya)
- Nirbachita Kabita (Selected Poems)
- Mahenzodaro (Mahenzodaro)
- Dhoop ke Rang (a translation of her poems in Hindi)
- Kho Jaati Hei Ladkiyan (a translation of her poems in Hindi)
- Grandma And Other Poems (a translation of her poems in English)
- Kahne ko Kuchh Nanhi Hota (a translation of her poems in Hindi)
- Dayanadi (a translation of her poems in Hindi)
- A Slice of Night (a translation of her poems in English)

=== Short story collections ===
- Bisarjana ("Immersion")
- Nijaku Nei Sata Gapa ("A True Story About Myself")

=== Novel ===
- Mummy Jaha Jane Nanhi ("What Mummy Does not Know")
- Rasta ("Road")

=== Essays ===
- Bichara Bimarsha

== Recognition ==
In 2000, she won the Odisha state Youth Award for poetry. In 2011, Panda won the Sahitya Akademi Yuva Puraskar literary honour in the poetry genre for Gaan, a collection of poems. In 2021 she was chosen for the Times Power Women.
