= Binapani Mohanty =

Indian writer (1936–2022)

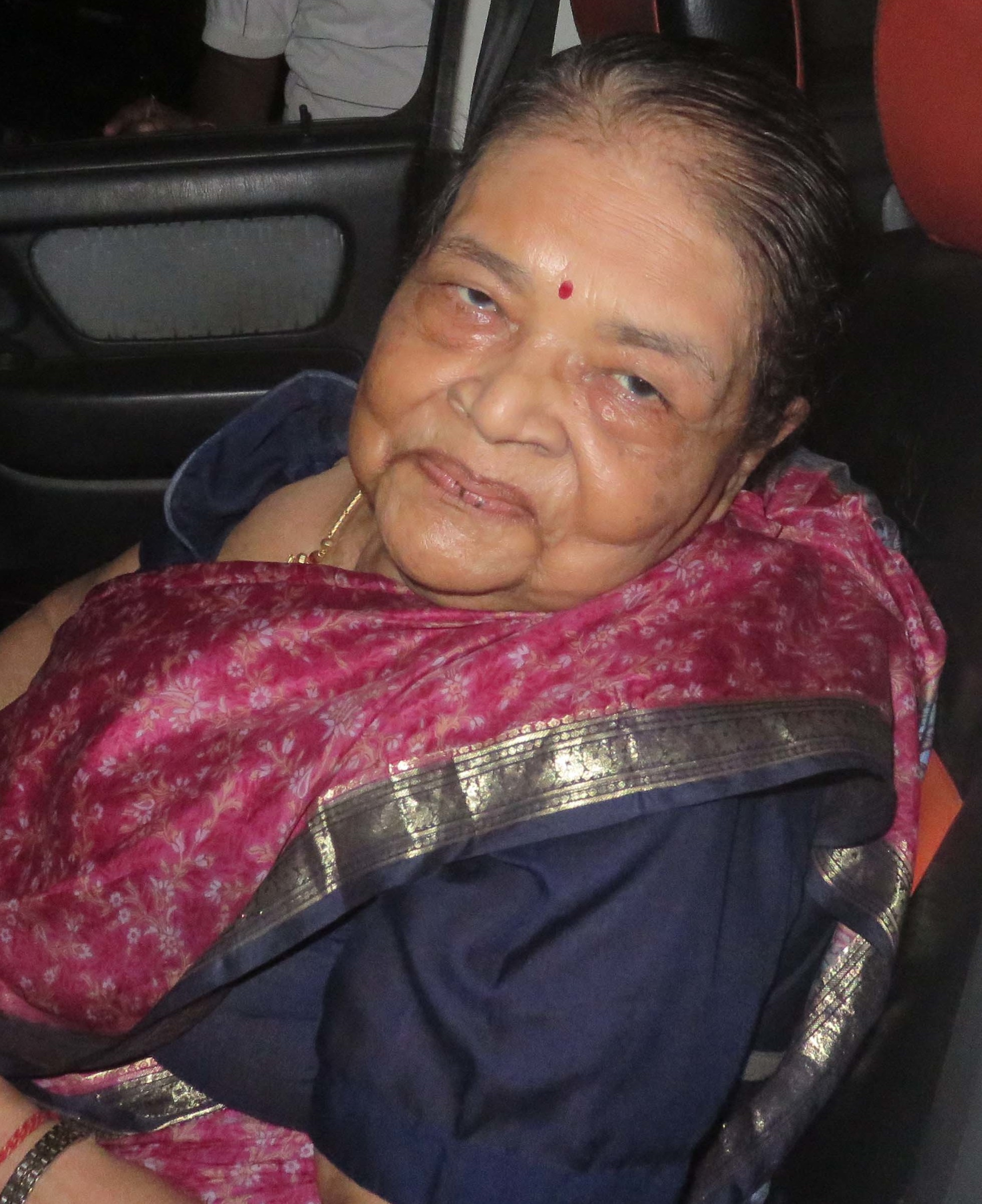
- Odia writer Binapani Mohanty
- Born: 11 November 1936; Chandol, Kendrapada, Bengal Presidency, British Raj
- Died: 24 April 2022 (aged 85); Cuttack, Odisha, India
- Citizenship: Indian
- Education: Post Graduate in Economics
- Alma mater: Ravenshaw College
- Occupation: Professor
- Writing career
- Language: Odia
- Years active: 1960–2022
- Period: Post Colonial
- Genres: Poem, Short Story
- Notable works: Patadei, Kasturi Mruga o Sabuja Aranya
- Notable awards: Padmashree, Sahitya Akademi Award

Binapani Mohanty (11 November 1936 – 24 April 2022) was an Indian Odia language writer and academician. She was well known for her works such as Patadei and Kasturi Mriga. She was a professor in economics before retiring. She had been awarded Padmashree by the Government of India and Atibadi Jagannatha Das Sammana by Odisha Sahitya Akademi. She had earlier won the Sahitya Akademi Award and Sarala Award. She had served as chairperson of Odisha Lekhika Sansad.

== Early life and professional career ==
Binapani was born to Chaturbhuja Mohanty and Kumudini Mohanty in a Hindu Karan family . Her family was from a village near Kendrapada called Chandol (then part of the undivided Cuttack district). However her father was a government servant and was posted at Berhampore where she was born in the year 1936. She completed her matriculation in 1953 and then went on to study economics. She got her bachelor's degree in 1957 and post graduation degree in 1959 from Ravenshaw college, Cuttack. She later worked as a lecturer and was posted to various colleges. She retired from Sailabala Women's College in 1992.

== Literary career ==
Binapani Mohanty has carved a niche for herself in the field of Odia fiction writing. Her literary career as a story-teller began with the publication of ‘Gotie Ratira Kahani’ in 1960. Some of her best known stories are Pata Dei, Khela Ghara, Naiku Rasta, Bastraharana, Andhakarara, Kasturi Murga O Sabuja Aranya and Michhi Michhika. It was the collection of short stories entitled 'Pata Dei and other Stories', that won the 1990 Sahitya Akademi. She was awarded the Padma Shri in 2020.

Her short story Pata Dei was published as Lata in Femina in 1986. In 1987, its Hindi dramatisation was telecast in Doordarshan as a series called Kashmakash.

Many short stories of Binapani Mohanty have been translated into different languages such as English, Hindi, Kannada, Malayalam, Marathi, Bengali, Urdu, Telugu and Russian. A film was made on her story " Andhakarara Chhai" and has been highly appreciated by the audience.

She has also penned three novels: Sitara Sonita, Manaswini and Kunti, Kuntala, Shakuntala and a one-act play entitled Kranti. She has translated Russian folk-tales from English to Odia, among other translations.

== Awards ==
She has won numerous awards including Padmashree. Few of them are noted below.

- Sunday Prajatantra Award For Poetry (1956)
- Jhankar for poetry (1961 )
- Orissa Sahitya Academy Award for the short story collection titled Kasruri Mruga O Sabuja Aranya (1968)
- Jibanranga Award for short story (1973)
- Challapatha Award for short story (1973)
- Jhankar Award for short story by Prajatantra Prachar Samiti (1974)
- Dharitri Award for short story (1980)
- Sahakar Award for short story (1985)
- Nilasaila Award for short(1987)
- Sucharita Award for short story (1988)
- Sahitya Akademi Award (1990)
- Sudhanya Award for short story (1992)
- Gokarnica Award (1999)
- Visuba Puraskar (2000)
- Sahitya Bharati Puraskar (2002)
- Gruhini Samaj Puraskar (2002)
- Bharat Chandra Sahitya Smruti Samman of Sambalpur University (2002)
- Pratham Reba Roy Samman (2004)
- Kadambini Samman (2009)
- Uttar Orissa Sahitya Samman (2010)

== Bibliography ==
=== Novels ===
- Sitara Sonita
- Manaswini
- Kunti, Kuntala, Shakuntala

=== Short Story ===
- Kasturi Mruga o Sabuja Aranya
- Kalantara
- Tatinira Trushna
- Bastra Harana
- Arohana
- Abhinetri
- Ekaki Parasara
- Ashru Anala
- Sakunira Chaka
- Khela Chalichi
- Anya Aranya
- Sayahnara svara : galpaguccha
- Barsha, barsha, Bharatabarsha
- Apahanca Akasha
- Andhakarara Chhai
- Padma ghunchi ghunchi jauchi
- Patadei

=== Autobiography/Biography ===
- Bitijaithiba Dina
- Kabi Bidyutprabha

=== Editor ===
- Odia lekhika : Uttar-madhya parba
- Ama samayara galpa
- Bhumi : kabita sankalana, 98-99
