= Kamal Vora =

Indian Gujarati-language poet and editor (Born: 1950)

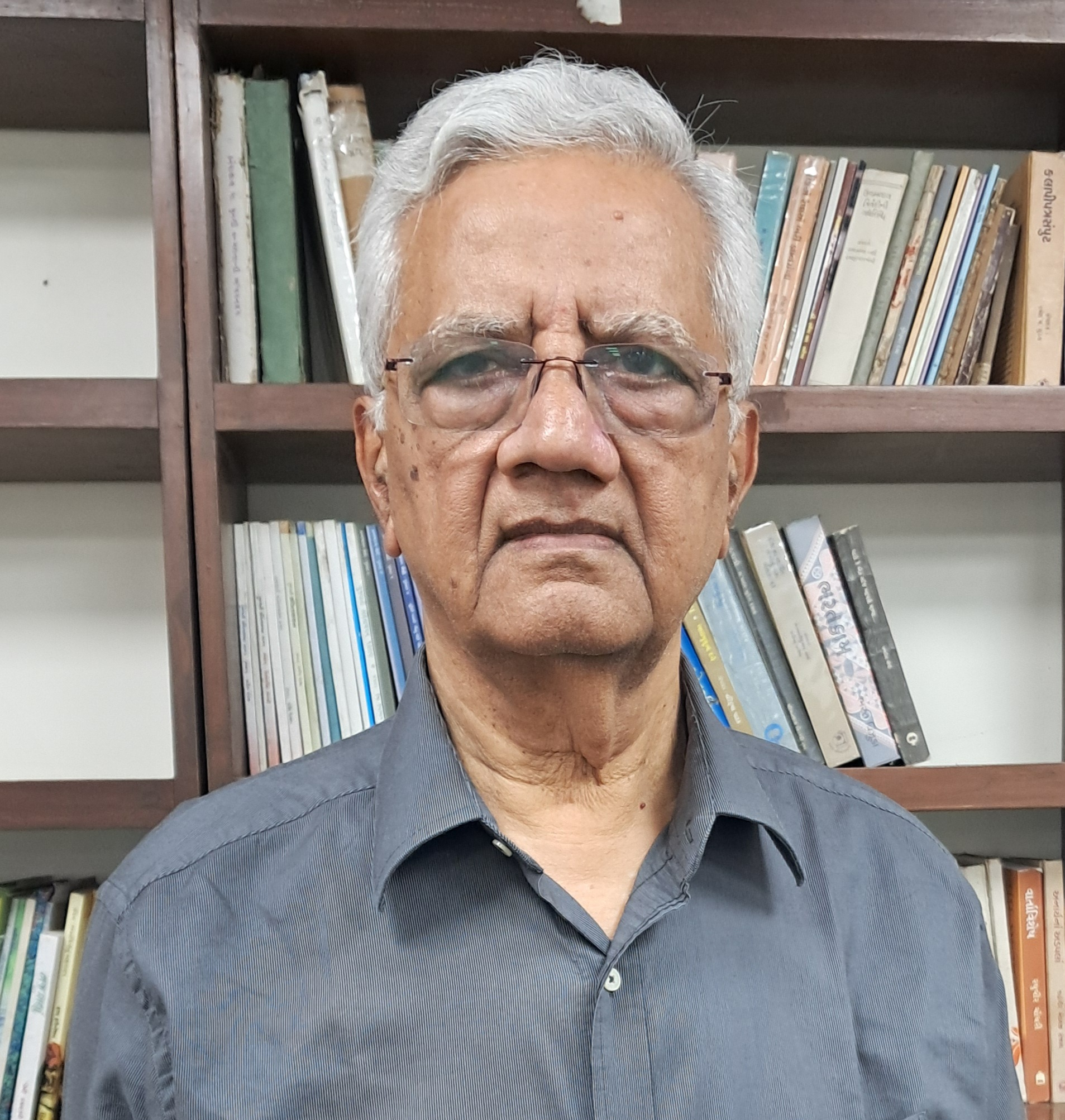
- Born: 19 May 1950 (age 76); Rajkot, Gujarat, India
- Occupations: poet, editor, translator
- Writing career
- Language: Gujarati
- Notable awards: Sahitya Akademi Award (2016); Gangadhar National Award For Poetry (2020); Narsinh Mehta Award (2024)

Kamal Vora (born 19 May 1950) is an Indian Gujarati-language poet, editor and translator from Mumbai, India. He is an editor of Etad, a quarterly Gujarati literary magazine.

== Biography ==
Kamal Vora was born on 19 May 1950 at Rajkot, Gujarat, India. He worked as an electrical engineer for seven years in a factory in Kalyan where his father used to work. Later he entered pharmaceutical industry with his brother.

Since 2010, he co-edits, with Naushil Mehta, a Gujarati quarterly journal Etad, founded by Suresh Joshi. He was a member of the Gujarati advisory board of Sahitya Akademi.

He lives in Ghatkopar, Mumbai.

== Works ==
Vora started writing poetry at the age of 18. His poems started appearing in magazines from 1971. His first anthology of poems Arav was published in 1991, followed by AnekEk (2012), Vruddhashatak (2015) and Jutthana (2023). His poems have been translated in Hindi, Marathi, Bengali, Kannada and English and appeared in Indian Literature, Chicago Review, Anthology of Asian Poets, Muse India etc. He co-edited with Pravin Pandya Aadhunik Bharatiya Kavita (Selection of Gujarati poetry from 1950 to 2010), published in 2017. His translations of world poetry are collected in Anuja (2023).

== Awards ==
He received the Sahitya Akademi Award (2016) for his book AnekEk (2012). His book Arav was awarded the Umashankar Joshi award. He is a recipient of the Gangadhar National Award For Poetry (2020) and the Narsinh Mehta Award (2024).

== See also ==
- List of Gujarati-language writers
