= Soubhagya Kumar Misra =

Indian poet and writer from Odisha

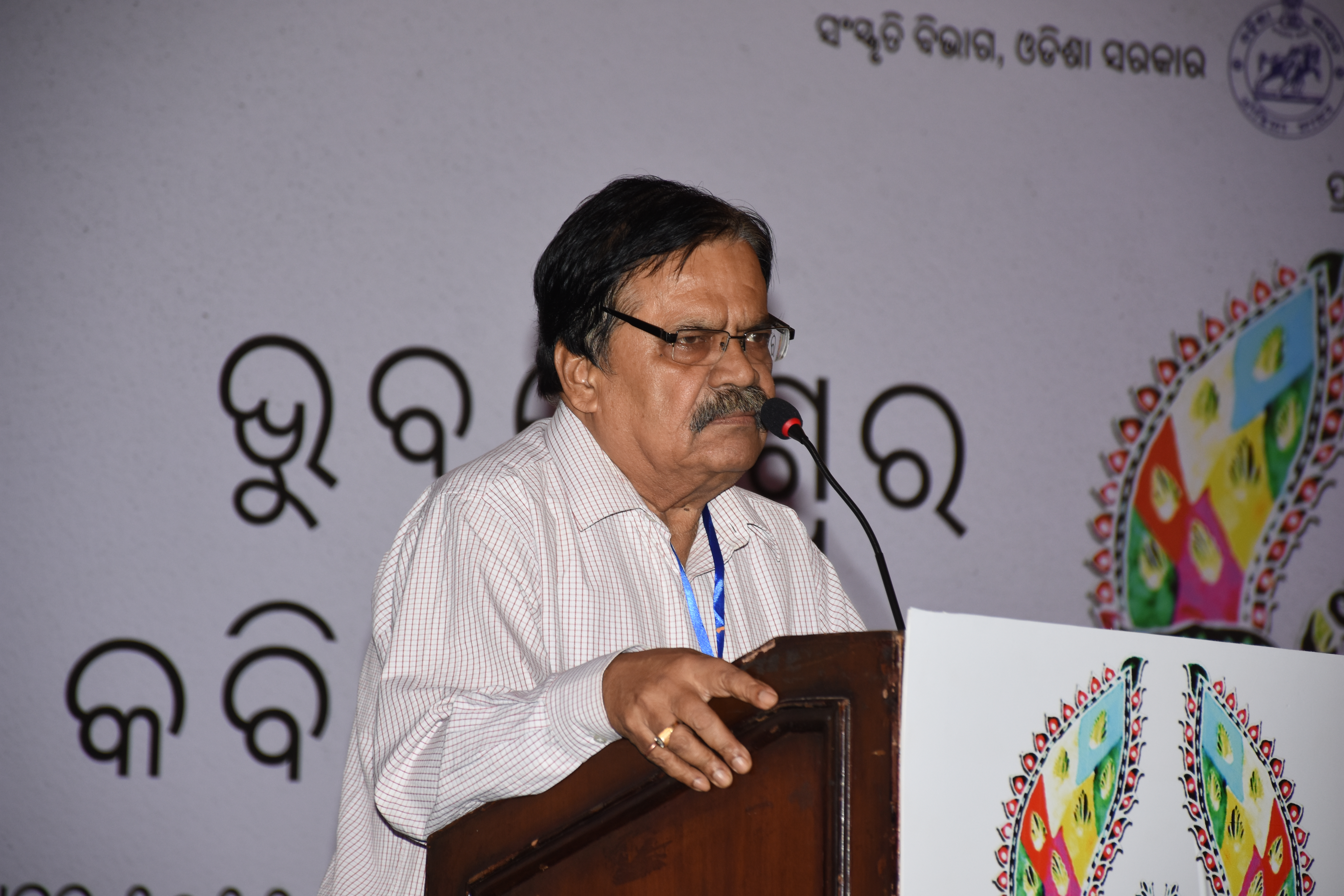
Soubhagya Kumar Misra

Soubhagya Kumar Misra (b. 1941) in an Indian poet and writer from Odisha. The Sahitya Akademi India's National Academy of Letters, awarded him the Sahitya Akademi Award in 1986. He is a recipient of Gangadhar National Award (2013).

== Biography ==
Born in 1941 at Berhampur, Odisha, Misra studied M.A. He served on advisory board of Odisha Sahitya Akademi, Central Sahitya Akademi and National Book Trust.

== Works ==
Mishra has published 17 poetry collections. His first poetry collection, Atmanepadi, was published in 1965. His other poetry collections are Asamapita, Antrustupa, Nishidha Harda, Nirjan Nakhatra, Madhanyara Chai, Saptama Pruthubi, Sunyatara Sosha, Dhulira Singhsana.

== Awards ==
In 1986, the Sahitya Akademi, India's National Academy of Letters, awarded him the Sahitya Akademi Award for his poetry collection Dwa Suparna. For his contribution to Odia poetry, the Odisha Sahitya Akademi awarded him the Deepak Mishra Memorial Award in 2019. He received the Gangadhar National Award (2013).

== Books ==
Poetry collection by Misra:

- Atmanepadi (1965)
- Madhyapadlopi (1970)
- Nai Panhara (1973)
- Andha Mahumachhi (1977)
- Bajrayana (1979)
- Dwa Suparna (1984)
- Manikarnika (1990)
- Anyatra (1994)
- Soubhagyakumar Misra Kavya Sambhar Vol. I, II, III (1994, 1996, 2009)
- Charachara (1999)
- Ujjaini (2005)
- Matrasparsha (2009)
