= Yashodhara Mishra =

Indian writer and poet

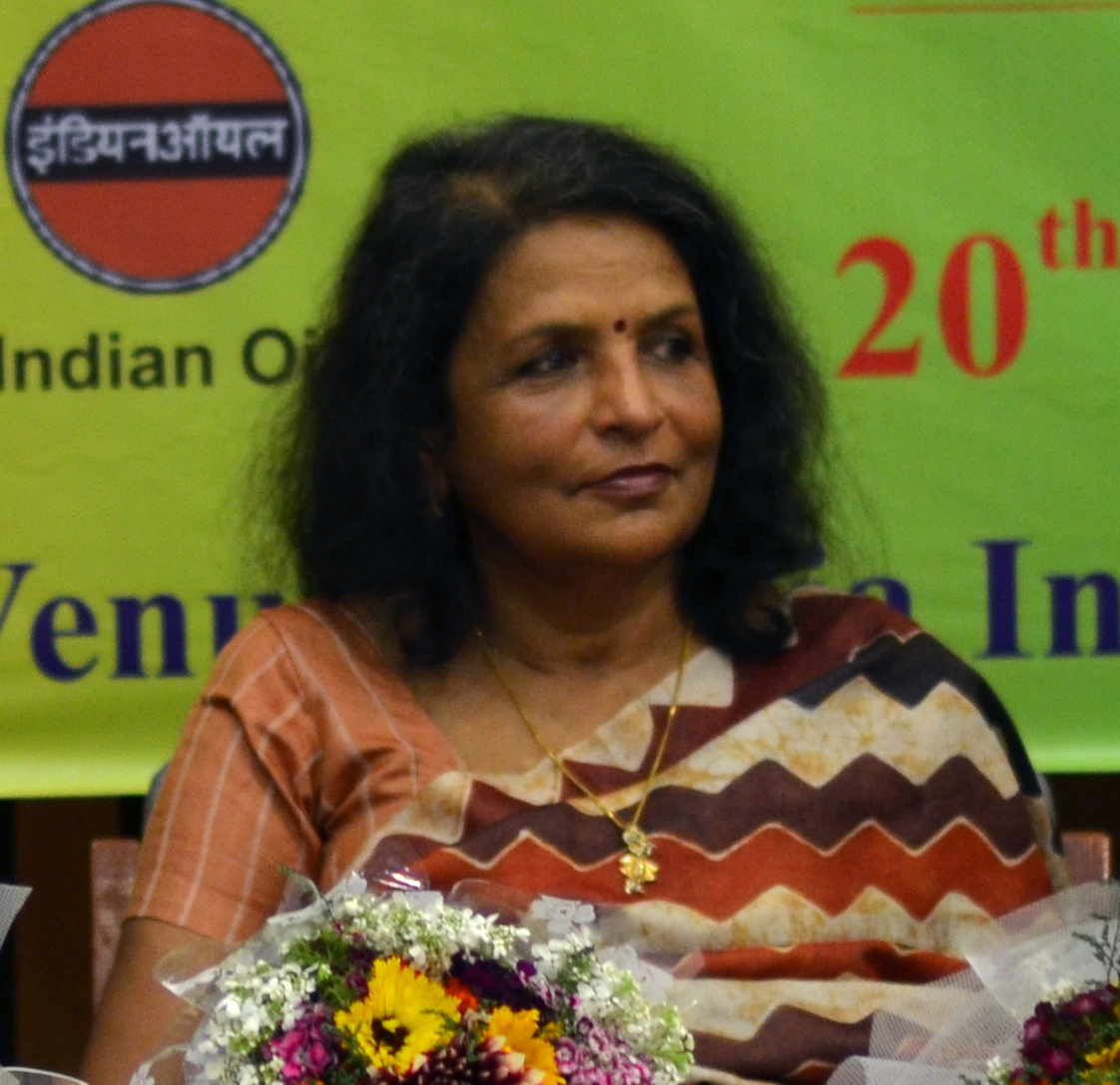
- Born: 1951 (age 74–75); Sambalpur, Odisha, India
- Occupations: Writer, poet
- Writing career
- Language: Odia
- Notable awards: Sahitya Akademi Award (2020)

Dr. Yashodhara Mishra (born 1951) is a Odia writer and poet. She is a professor of English who has published poems, several collections of short stories and novels. She was a fellow at the Indian Institute of Advanced Study.

== Life ==
Mishra was born in Sambalpur in 1951. She is a poet and a professor of English who has published several collections of short stories and novels. She has worked in the Odia language, Hindi and English.

Mishra has garnered a number of awards including the Katha Prize Story award.

She is a fellow at the Indian Institute of Advanced Study where her research includes rituals and gender and the Women of Orissa.

Mishra won the Sahitya Akademi Award for Odia in 2020 for her book, Samudrakula Ghara.

== Awards ==
- 2020: Sahitya Akademi Award, for Samudrakula Ghara
