= Kalidas Gupta Riza =

Indian writer (1925–2001)

- Born: 1925; India
- Died: 2001 (aged 75–76)
- Occupation: Writer
- Awards: Padma Shri; Ghalib Award

Kalidas Gupta Riza (1925–2001) was an Indian writer and authority on the writings of the Urdu poet Mirza Ghalib. He authored several books on Ghalib. A recipient of the Ghalib Award in 1987, he was honored by the government of India in 2001 with the fourth-highest Indian civilian award of Padma Shri. Riza's edition of Ghalib's Diwan Diwan-e-'Raza, published in 1995, supplanted Imtiaz Ali 'Arshi''s 1958 version as the most comprehensive and chronologically correct edition of Ghalib's Urdu poetry.
