= Sheen Kaaf Nizam =

Urdu poet and literary scholar

Shiv Kishan Bissa
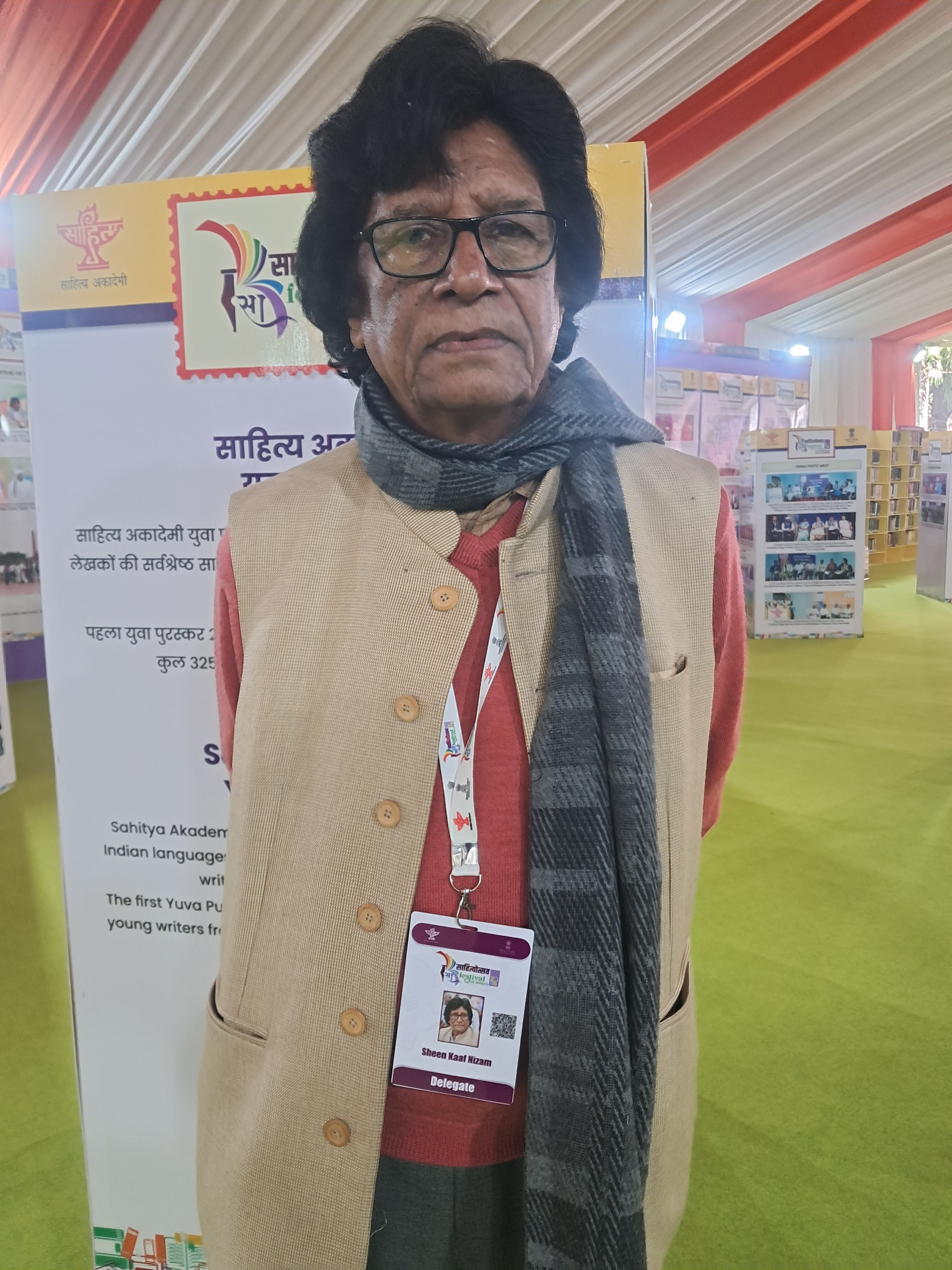
- Nizam at Sahitya Akademi, New Delhi, March 2025
- Born: Shiv Kishan Bissa; 26 November 1945(80 Yrs.); Jodhpur, Rajasthan, India
- Occupations: Poet, Critic
- Writing career
- Pen name: Sheen Kaaf Nizam
- Notable work: Gumshuda Dair ki Gunjti Ghantiyan
- Notable awards: Mahmood shirani award by Rajasthan Urdu academy Jaipur (1999-2000) Bhasha Bharati award maysore (2001) Bhegum Akhtar ghazal award Delhi (2006) Rastriya Iqbal samaan (2006-2007) Sahitya Akademi (2010) Jnvu Gaurav Ratna (2015) Aacharya vidhyaniwas Mishra smriti samaan Banaras (2016) Sankriti Saurabh samaan Kolkata (2018) Gangadhar National Award (2021) Rajasthan ratn award (2022) Padma Shri (2025)

Sheen Kaaf Nizam, born in the year 1945 or 1946 in Jodhpur, India, is an Urdu poet and literary scholar. His birth name is Shiv Kishan Bissa. Sheen Kaaf Nizam is his pen name. He has edited many volumes of poets in Devanagari including Deewan-e-Ghalib and Deewan-e-Mir.

In January 2025, he was honored with the Padma Shri, India's fourth-highest civilian award, by the Government of India.

== Literary career ==
Nizam has published a number of poetry collections. Listed down are his books.

- Lamhon kee Saleeb
- Dasht mein Dariya
- Naad
- Saya Koi Lamba Na Tha
- Bayazein Kho Gayi Hai
- Gumshuda Dair ki Gunjti Ghantiyan
- Rasta Yeh Kahin Nahin Jaata
- Orr Bhi hai naam raaste ka
- Saayon Ke saaye me

Nizam's poetry collection Gumshuda Dair ki Gunjti Ghantiyan won the 2010 Sahitya Akademi Award in Urdu.

Nizam compiled an appraisal of the life and works of fellow Rajasthani Urdu poet Makhmoor Saeedi titled Bheed mein akelaa was published by the Rajasthan Urdu Akademi in 2007.

He has edited a book on renowned research scholar “allama kalidas Gupta riza” titled “Ghalibiyat or gupta riza” He has also edited and introduced Morden Urdu poet “meera Ji “ with selection of his poems in Nagri. A selection of Famous Pakistani Urdu poet “munir niyazi” has also been published in Nagri by him.

== Criticism ==
- ”lafz dar lafz”
- ”mani dar mani”
- ”tazkira massir shoara e Jodhpur”

== Awards ==
- Padma Shri 2025

== See also ==
- List of Sahitya Akademi Award winners for Urdu
