= Sundri Uttamchandani =

Indian writer of Sindhi language

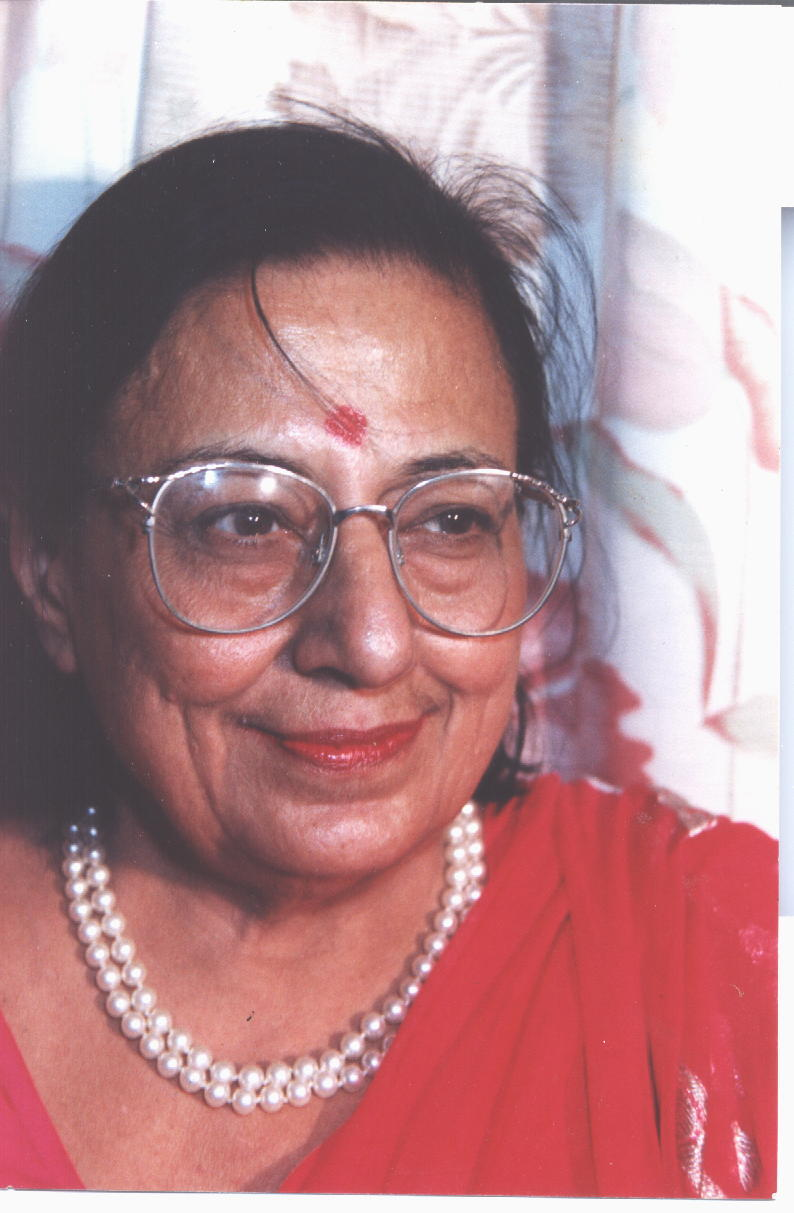
- Born: 28 September 1924
- Died: 8 July 2013 (aged 88)
- Occupations: Poet, Prose writer
- Movement: Progressive

Sundri Uttamchandani (28 September 1924 – 8 July 2013) was a noted Indian writer. She wrote mostly in Sindhi language. She was married to progressive writer A. J. Uttam.

In 1986 she was awarded the Sahitya Akademi Award by Sahitya Akademi in Sindhi for her Book Vichhoro, a compilation of nine short stories.

== Biography ==
Sundri Uttamchandani was born on 28 September 1924 at Hyderabad Sindh (now in Pakistan). Hydrabad was the capital of Sindh before the conquest of Sindh by the British. Though it lost its position as a capital city but, it continued to be a thriving centre of education literature and culture. All reform movements were rooted in its soil. At the very young age, Sundri was exposed to a vast repertoire of folk and mythological tales which were narrated by her parents to her and other children of the extended joint family. During her youth the freedom movement was sweeping across the country and she could not but be drawn to it. While still in college she translated a story "Bhadur Maao Ji Bahadur Deeah" (A brave daughter of a brave mother). This was her initiation in the literary field.

She married Assandas Uttamchandani (A.J.Uttam), a Freedom fighter, with a keen interest in Sindhi Literature with clear leanings toward Marxist Philosophy and, who become in the later years one of the leading writers of Sindhi progressive literary movement, A J Uttam, was one of the founders of Sindhi Sahit Mandal in Bombay. Sundri accompanied him to weekly literary meetings which were presided over by a fatherly figure, Prof M U Malkani, who was a fountain head of encouragement to new and upcoming writers.
This exposure to Sindhi writers and their creative works were to become source of inspiration for her and in the year 1953 she produced her first novel "Kirandar Deewaroon" (Crumbling walls). This proved to be path breaking. She shattered the near monopoly of male domination in literature by her one feat, while on the one hand, she won the accolades and acclaim of all senior writers for use of 'homely' language, a folksy- idiomatic language used by women folk in their household and thus brought in a new literary flavour in Sindhi literature. The theme and structure of the novel was mature and it has distinction of being reprinted many times over. This Novel was translated into many Indian languages and brought her acclaim by literary critics of those languages, thus elevating her from a writer of a regional language to a writer of All India fame. Her Second Novel "Preet Purani Reet Niraali" came in the year 1956, which has run into 5 reprints, which amply speaks of its merit and popularity.

Apart from her path breaking novels, it is in short story form in which she found herself more comfortable. She has collections of short stories to her credit some of which have gone into various reprints. Some of her short stories have become water mark in this genre and are often cited as outstanding examples.

Her Story" Bhoori" (A doll) brings out in stark relief the beauty of yester years, who due to ravages of partition of the country has lost her enchanting looks but is radiant with inner beauty born out of dignity of labour and assured demeanor to shoulder economic responsibilities to feed her family, thus standing shoulder to shoulder with her husband, ushering in gender equality without being sounding stirringly feminist.Her first story 'Mamta' against the war won her first prize in 1952 in a short story competition. 'Koshan' was another story which also appreciated and received first prize in 1954 from Kahani Magazine.In early sixties a Publisher of 'KAHANI' magazine had organised a short story competition in which many stalwarts of the time participated and Sundri's short story "KHEER BARIYA HATHRA" won the first prize. This was story published in a book titled as "KHEER BARIYA HATHRA" 1960 by KAHANI. Her story "HI SHAHAR" (This City) is everlasting portrayal of a meek Nepali watchman in a lower middle class apartment building in this city as a vast ruthless and soul less machine, unmindful of the personal loss or tragedy. Sundri has tried her hand at traditional poetry with proper meter but it is in free verse where she has found her niche. She has four poetry collections to her credit. Her poems delve deep into subtle and delicate gamut of emotions and find artistic and imaginative articulation with her individual stamp.

Apart from winning many awards throughout her vast and eventful literary career, she was bestowed prestigious Sahitya Akademi Award for her Book "Vichhoro" in the year 1986.

As a part of Progressive Writers' movement she has written on erstwhile Soviet Union, "NAEEN SABHYATA Jo DARSHAN' and Bharat Roos ba Banh Beli (India Russia two comrades in arms) for which she won The coveted Soviet Land Award. She has inspired many women writers to contribute to Sindhi literature and will continue to inspire future generations.

== Literary career ==
Started writing in the year 1946. She has written 200 Short Stories, 2 Novels, 12 one act plays, Approx. 500 essays 200 poems. Has translated many novels, short stories and poems of renowned writers viz. Amrita Pritam, Maxim Gorky, Krishanchandra, Sholokhav etc.

- Positions Held: Pioneer Member of Sindhi Sahitya Mandal & Akhil Bharat Sindhi Boli and Sahit Sabha
- Founder of: Sindhu Nari Sabha and Sindhu Bal Mandir

== Awards received ==
- Soviet Land Nehru Peace award, comprising cash award and 2 weeks visit to USSR.
- Award from Hindi Directorate, Ministry of Education for the Book ‘Bhoori’
- Cash Prize of Rs. 10,000/- from Akhil Bharat Sindhi Boli Ain Sahit Sabha – 1985
- Sahitya Academy award 1986 on Book ‘Vichhoro’
- Cash Prize of Rs. 100,000/- Guarav Purskar from Govt. of Maharashtra.
- Cash Prize of Rs. 50,000/- towards Life Time Achievement Award from NCPSL – National Council for Promotion Of Sindhi Language in 2005.
- Cash Prize of Rs.150,000 and Citetion from Sindhi Akademi, Delhi in 2012

== Telefilms made ==
- Bandhan 1986 – In Hindi
- Vilayati Ghot ji Golha – Director – Kamal Nathani
- Kitty Party – Director Kailash Advani
- Bhoori – 2008 – Director Rajesh Bachchani
- Insaaf—2012 – Director Kamal Nathani

Documentary made on Sundri Uttamchandani along with two leading Sindhi lady writers Prof. Popati Hiranandani & Kala Prakash (Sindhi Sahit jun te barkh Lekhkaun)

Available all over India through Sindhi Sangat

== List of books ==
- Kirandar Deewarun – 1953 (5 editions and translated in 3 languages)
- Aman Sade Peyo – 1966
- Preet Purani Reet Niralee – 1956 (5 editions)
- Bharat Russ Ba Bahn Boli
- Hugao 1993
- To Jin Jee Taat – 1970
- Murk Te Manah 1992
- Naien Sabhitya jo Darshan – 1975
- Bhoori – 1979 (3 editions)
- Hik Sassui Sao Soor (Trans) – 1963
- Achaa Vaar Gaara Gul – 1965
- Atam Vishwas – 1999
- Vichooro – 1989 (2 editions)
- Sindhu(Dramas) – 2000
- Yugaantar – 1989
- Nakhreliyun – 2001
- Kheryal Dharti – 1992
- Daath bani aa laat – 2004
- Bandhan – 1985 (3 editions)
- Chanchala- Translation of her stories in Hindi – 2011
