= Pathani Pattnaik =

Indian writer (1928–2017)

Pathani Pattnaik (19 September 1928 – 4 February 2017) was an Indian writer of Odia language. He won the Sahitya Akademi Award in 2010 for his autobiography Jibanara Chalapathe.

== Biography ==
Pattanaik was born on 19 September 1928 at Golobai village of Khurda district, Odisha. He received primary schooling in his village and later completed matriculation from Puri District School in 1945. He received his post-graduation from Ravenshaw College. He served as principal of Christ College and as the president of Odisha Sahitya Akademi from 2000 to 2003.

He died on 4 February 2017.

== Works ==
He wrote over 80 books in different literary forms including children literature, novel, short stories and linguistics.

=== Books ===
- ‘Sahitya O Sanskruti’
- ‘Sahitya Manisha’
- ‘Sahitya Parikrama’
- ‘Odia Upanyasa Sahityara Parichaya’
- ‘Prabandha O Samalochana’
- ‘Samaja O Sahitya’
- ‘Sahitya O Samiksha’

== Honours ==
Pattanaik received the Sahitya Akademi Award in 2010 for his autobiography Jibanara Chalapathe. He won the Odia Sahitya Academy Award in 1993.
