= Jayant Parmer =

Indian Urdu language poet (born 1954)

Jayant Parmar (born 11 October 1954) is an Indian Urdu language poet known for raising Dalit issues in his poetry. Parmar was born in a poor family. At a young age, he began to paint miniature paintings for a frame maker. Parmar realized that the frame maker had a separate pot for him because he was Dalit. This saddened Parmar and he quit.

Parmar taught himself Urdu from a language learning guide at age 30 after he developed an appreciation for Urdu poetry while living in a Muslim-dominated area in the walled city area of Ahmedabad. He has published a number of poetry collections: Aur in 1998, Pencil Aur Doosri Nazmein in 2006, Manind in 2008, Antaral in 2010 and Giacometti ke sapne in 2016. Parmar won the 2008 Sahitya Akademi Award in Urdu for Pencil Aur Doosri Nazmein. His work has been translated into Kashmiri, Punjabi, Hindi, Marathi, Bangla, Kannada, Gujarati, Oriya and Slovenian.
