= Popati Hiranandani =

Indian writer

- Born: 17 September 1924; Hyderabad, Bombay Presidency, British India
- Died: 16 December 2005 (aged 81); Mumbai, Maharashtra, India
- Education: Banaras Hindu University
- Occupation: Writer
- Writing career
- Notable awards: Sahitya Akademi Award (1982)

Popati Hiranandani (17 September 1924 – 16 December 2005) was an Indian writer who authored more than sixty books in Sindhi language during her life. She was an essayist, fiction writer, poet, educationist, feminist and social activist. She made significant contributions to Sindhi literature before and after the partition of India. She won several awards including the Sahitya Akademi Award (1982), Woman of the Year Award (1988), and the Gaurav Puraskar (1990) among others.

== Biography ==
She was born on 17 September 1924 in a Hindu Amil family of Hyderabad, Sindh. Her father Ramchand Hiranandani was a forest officer. She was the second eldest of seven children, and lost her father at the age of ten. She studied at Kundan Mal High School and Miran College Hyderabad. In order to support her family, she joined as a music teacher at Kundan Mal High School and Pigit Girls School Hyderabad, while continuing her studies simultaneously. After graduating from Banaras Hindu University in 1943 with a distinction in Sanskrit, she began teaching languages and literature. She retired as chairperson of Sindhi Department of Kishinchand Chellaram College, Bombay (now Mumbai). During the last years of her service at this college, she also taught and supervised postgraduate students of the Bombay University.

In 1970, she was nominated as a member of a panel of advisors of the Audition Committee of All India Radio, Bombay. In the same year, she was nominated as a member of the Advisory Board for Sindhi, Ministry of Education, Government of India. In 1972, she was selected as a member of Sahitya Akademi's Advisory Board for Sindhi. In 1974, she served as Secretary of All India Sindhi Language and Literary Association. In 1977, she was a member of the selection committee for Dictionary of Scientific and Technical Terminology and in 1979 as a member of the selection committee of the Union Public Service Commission. In 1988, she was the convener of the Sahitya Akademi's Advisory Board.

== Books ==
She authored more than 60 books which include short stories, novels, poems, criticism, essays, autobiography and translations. They include:

- Aziz Shaksu Ain Alim, 1980, Criticism
- Belong to a Land, 1991, Poems
- Bhasha Shastra, 1962, Philology
- Bharat Ji Istri, 1963
- Boli Muhinji Mau, 1977, Essays
- Churan Chimkan Chit Men, 1971, Essays
- Hasratun Ji Turbat, 1961, Novel
- Hiku Pushup Pundhram Pankhriyun, 1962, Essays
- History of Post Independence Sindhi literature, 1984
- Hut Tawheen Hit Aseen, 1988, Short Stories
- Jia Men Jhori, Tan Men Taat, 1968, Short Stories
- Kabir, 1989, Translation
- Kali Gulab Ji Sagar Sharab Jo, 1967, Short Stories
- Khizan jo Daur Pooro Thiyo, 1976, Short Stories
- Learn Sindhi Within 10 Days, 1984
- Maan Chha Ahiyan, 1965
- Man Sindhin, 1988, Poems
- Manik Moti Lal, 1993, Biography
- Manju, 1950, Novel
- Muhinjay Hayatia Ja Sona Rupa Warq, 1980, Autobiography
- Padmini, 1984
- Pukar, 1953, Short Stories
- Rageen Zamanay Joon Ghamgheen Kahaniyoon, 1953, Short Stories
- Ruha Sandhi Ranjh, 1975, Poems
- Shahnaz, 1983, Short Stories
- Sailab Zingia Jo, 1980, Novel
- Shah Sindhi Tahzeeb Jo Rooh, 1983, Latifyat
- Shrimad Bhagvad, 1980, Translation
- Sindhi Boli, 1981, Philology
- Sindhi Muslman Kaviyun Ji Hindi Kavita, 1982
- Sindhi Sahitya Ji Jhalak, 1967
- Sindhi Shadi, 1988
- Sindhis the Scattered Treasurer, 1980
- Tanqeedi Mazmoon, 1985, Criticism
- Vivekanand Jeevani, 1963, Translation
- Zindah Sa Qaum Rahandi, Essays, 1976
- Zindagia Ji Photri (1933)
- Zindagi Na Kavita Na Kahani, 1984, Short Stories

== Books on Popati Hiranandani ==
Following two books have been written on life and literary contributions of Popti Hiranandani:

- Popati Hiranandani Shakhsiyat ain Sanman Parcho, Koonj Publications, Bombay, 1975
- Paun Phutti Popati, Veena Publications, Ulhasnagar, 1988

== Awards and honours ==
- Sahitya Academy Award (1982) on her autobiography Muhinji Hayati-a-Ja Sona-Ropa Warq
- Woman of the Year Award (1988)
- Gaurav Purasker Award (1990) by Maharashtra Government
- Aseen Sindhi Award (1990), Dubai
- Sindhi Academy Award (1993)
- International Latif award (1990), Dubai
- Sindhi Navratan title (1993) by Sindhi Cultural Association, Mumbai
- Akhil Bharat Sindhi Boli Ain Sahit Sabha Award (1998)

== Death ==
Popati Hiranandai died on 16 December 2005 in Mumbai.
