= Imtiaz Ali 'Arshi' =

Urdu author

Imtiaz Ali Arshi (8 December 1905 – 25 February 1981) was an Indian research scholar best known as an authority on the works of Mirza Ghalib. He published works on Ghalib, Maktiba-e-Ghalib (1937), Intikhab-e-Ghalib (1943), culminating in his edition of Ghalib's Diwan titled Nuskha-e-Arshi published in 1958. Arshi was awarded the 1961 Sahitya Akademi Award winners for Urdu for the Diwan.

Nuskha-Arshi is cited by Urdu scholar Gopi Chand Narang as the most comprehensive early attempt to publish Ghalib's ghazals in a chronological fashion, allowing for a study of the evolution in the poet's themes and techniques, though there were mistakes in the chronology. According to Narang, Arshi's Diwan was the main source for the study of Ghalib's work until a more complete and chronologically correct Diwan'-e-Raza was published by Kalidas Gupta Riza in 1995.
