= Krishna Kumar Toor =

Urdu poet

Krishna Kumar Toor is an Urdu poet whose collection Ghurfa-i-Ghalib won the 2012 Sahitya Akademi Award for Urdu.
