= Mohan Kalpana =

Sindhi language writer

- Born: Mohan Bulchand; 22 November 1930; Kotri, Bombay Presidency, British India
- Died: 19 June 1992 (aged 61); Ulhasnagar, India
- Occupation: Writer
- Writing career
- Notable work: Books (25)

Mohan Kalpana (born Mohan Bulchand Lala, 22 November 1930) was an Indian writer in the Sindhi language. He was one of the foremost writers of fiction in the post-independence era of Sindh and India. He died on 19 June 1992.

== Education ==
He received primary and secondary education from the Kotri and Karachi schools.

== Literary career ==
Mohan Kalpana was one of the tri-murti of Sindhi fiction in the second generation who tried to be distinct from the first generation of Sindhi writers. They tried to profess the progressive school of thought. The other two were Guno Samtaney and Lal Pushp. They differed among themselves also in thought and style. Kalpana was struggling between the realistic and romantic school of thought even bordering on the progressive school. Kalpana had given quite a lot to post partition Sindhi literature. He has written over 200 short stories. He wrote many novels, including Jalavatni, which depicts nostalgic memories of Sindh, which Kalpana was forced to leave due to the partition of the country. He was also a poet, and critic of a sort.

== Publications ==
Mohan had written 25 books. Most of them were novels. A few most significant are:

- 1. Anja Raat Baki Ahee (Night is still there), 1955, report on Goan freedom struggle.
- 2. Surga Jee Golha (Search for heaven), 1958, children's novel.
- 3. Chandini Ain Zahar (Moonlight and poison), 1967, nine stories.
- 4. Farishtan Jee Duniya (The world of angels), 1967, nine stories.
- 5. Maau (Mother), 1979, Novel.
- 6. Uha Shaam (That evening), 1981, seven stories.

== Award ==
Mohan received a prestigious Sahitya Akademi Award for his Book 'Uha Shaam' in 1984.

== Death ==
Mohan Kalpana died on 19 June 1992, in India.
