= Arjumand Ara =

Indian professor of Urdu literature

Arjumand Ara is an Indian professor of Urdu literature at University of Delhi. She is a translator, critic and a scholar of humanities. She has translated Findings, Keepings: Life, Communism and Everything, biography of eminent Urdu Scholar Ralph Russell into Urdu. In 2021, She has received Sahitya Akademi Translation Prize for translating Arundhati Roy's English novel The Ministry of Utmost Happiness into Urdu.

== Alma Mater ==
- Jawaharlal Nehru University, Delhi
