= Dash Benhur =

Odia writer

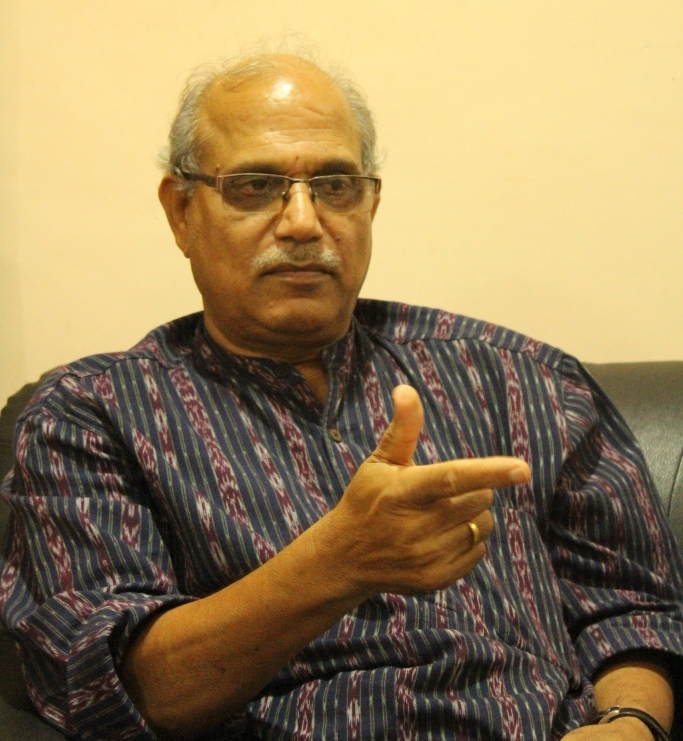
- Born: Jitendra Narayan Dash; 3 August 1953 (age 73); Khandapada, Nayagarh district, Odisha
- Education: Utkal University
- Occupation: Lecturer
- Spouse: Jayanti Panda
- Writing career
- Language: Odia
- Notable awards: Sahitya akademi Bal award

Jitendra Narayan Dash (birth 3 August 1953), who writes under the pseudonym of Dash Benhur is a Sahitya Akademi award winner writer from Odisha. He was born in Khandapada in Nayagarh district, Odisha. He retired as the Principal of Samanta Chandra Sekhara College, Puri. He is a founder member of Aama Odisha.

== Works ==
He is the author of more than 100 books, including 15 collections of short-stories.

=== Children's literature ===
- The Puduga king & other stories, 2013
- Unforgettable Stories, 2007
- A Basket of Stories (Stories), 2005
- The Story of Maita (Novel), 2005
- Manu and the Sparrow (Story), 2001
- Play Fun with Riddles (Riddles), 2001
- My Pet Poetry Book (Poem), 2001
- All Time Rhymes for Children, 2001
- Rhymes for Little Reema, 2001

=== Short stories ===
- Kaanduri and Other Stories, 2015
- Gandhi Tales from Odisha, 2013
- Alms and other stories, 2008
- The Tribute and other stories, 2006
- The Drawing and other stories, 1987

=== Novel ===
- Pagadi purusha,2015

== Awards ==
- Sahitya Akademi Bal Puraskar, 2014
- Odisha Vigyan Academy Popular Science-writer award, 1999
- NCERT Prize for Children's Literature,1989
- Odisha Sahitya Academy award, 1987
