= Cecil J. Toor =

American football coach (1895–1969)

Biographical details
- Born: July 28, 1895; Philadelphia, Pennsylvania, U.S.
- Died: May 23, 1969 (aged 73); Ambler, Pennsylvania, U.S.

Coaching career (HC unless noted)

Football
- 1922: Delaware Valley

Head coaching record
- Overall: 0–8

Cecil J. Toor (July 28, 1895 – May 23, 1969) was an American football coach. He served as the head football coach at Delaware Valley College in 1922.
