= Ather Farouqui =

Indian writer

Dr. Ather Farouqui (born 1964) is a writer. He is the General Secretary of Anjuman Taraqqi Urdu (Hind) and the Secretary of Zakir Hussain Study Circle. Farouqui has been awarded the Sahitya Academy Award for the translation of the play ‘Sons of Babur’ in Urdu. He has also been conferred with the ‘Best Translator’ award in 2016 by Delhi Urdu Academy.

== Early life and education ==
Dr. Ather Farouqui was born in 1964 in Sikandrabad, Uttar Pradesh.

He completed his M.A. from Chaudhary Charan Singh University in Urdu Literature and went to study at Jawahar Lal Nehru University first for a Diploma in Mass Communication followed by an MPhil and a Ph.D. under Professor Imtiaz Ahmad on the socio-political condition of Urdu in India in the post-partition era.

== Books ==
Dr. Ather Farouqui has authored several books in English Hindi and Urdu, his writings include:

English

- Redefining Urdu Politics in India (OUP 2006)
- Muslims and Media Images: News versus Views (OUP 2009)
- The Life and Poetry of Bahadur Shah Zafar (Translation of Aslam Parvez's book. Hay House 2017 (hardbound); paperback 2021)
- Delhi in Historical Perspectives (Translation of K.A. Nizami’s lectures on Delhi. OUP 2020)
- The Last Gathering (Translation of Munshi Faizuddiin's book Bazm-I-Aakhir. Roli Books, 2021)
- Sawaneh-i Dehli : Biography of Delhi (Translation of Mirza Ahmed Akhtar Gorgani's first-hand account of life on the streets of Delhi)

Urdu

- Makhmoor Saeedi Ek Muta’la (Allama Iqbal Cultural Society. Sikandrabad, 1986)
- Rasheed Hasan Khan: Hayat aur Adabi Khidma’t (Maktaba Jamia, New Delhi 2002)
- Guftugoo Unki (Anjuman Taraqqi Urdu (Hind), 2006)
- Azad Hindustan Mein Urdu Zaban, Taleem aur Sahafat (Anjuman Taraqqi Urdu (Hind), 2007)
- Hindustaan Mein Urdu Siyasat ki Tafheem-i Nau (Anjuman Taraqqi Urdu (Hind), 2010)
- Na Mukammal (Urdu, 2010)
- Ghalib's Qaadirnama (Edited, NCPUL, 2011)
- Unneesveen Sadi Main Adab, Tareekh aur Tehzeeb (Anjuman Taraqqi Urdu (Hind), 2014)
- Armughan-I Faruqi (Festschrift in honour of S.R. Faruqi) (Anjuman Taraqqi Urdu (Hind), 2019)
- Akhtar ul-Iman (Anjuman Taraqqi Urdu (Hind) 2015)
- Babur Ki Aulad (Rupa &amp; Company, New Delhi. 2008)

Hindi

- Akhtar-ul Iman's Sarosaaman into Devanagari (transliteration from Urdu into Hindi, Saransh Prakashan. 1996)
- Babur Ki Aulad (Hindi Translation, Rupa & Company 2008)

== Journals ==
Dr. Ather Farouqui is the editor of the following journals:

Urdu

- Urdu Adab (quarterly journal published by Anjuman Taraqqui Urdu Hind)
- Hamari Zabaan. (weekly newspaper published by Anjuman Taraqqui Urdu Hind)

== Reviews ==
Dr. Ather Farouqui's review work includes:

- ‘On Urdu’, Review of ‘How Not to Write the History of Urdu Literature’ by Ralph Russell (EPW, Vol. 35, Issue No. 21/22, 27 May 2000).
- ‘Salvaging Urdu from Degradation' Review of 'The Oxford India Anthology of Modern Urdu Literature, Poetry and Prose Miscellaneous', edited by Mehr Afshan Farooqi (EPW, Vol. 43, Issue No. 18, 3 May 2008).
- Review of ‘Liking Progress, Loving Change: Literary History of the Progressive Writers’ Movement’, by Rakshanda Jalil (Published by Sahitya Akademi. Vol. 58, No. 4 (282). July/August 2014).
- ‘Estranged Siblings: Urdu and Hindi’ Review of the book ‘From Hindi to Urdu: A Social and Political History’ by Tariq Rahman (Hyderabad: Orient Blackswan), 2011, Vol. 46, Issue No. 38, 17 September 2011).

== Articles ==
Dr. Ather Farouqui has contributed to Outlook, Times of India, Economic and Political Weekly, American Journal of Economics and Sociology, South Asia Journal of South Asian Studies, IIC Quarterly, Mainstream, and The Milli Gazette among others. His articles include:

Articles

- ‘Future Prospects of Urdu in India’ (Mainstream, Annual issue 1992).
- ‘Urdu Education in India: Four Representative States’ (EPW, Vol. 29, No. 14 (2 April 1994), pp. 782–785).
- ‘The Emerging Dilemma of the Urdu Press in India’ (The American Journal of Economics and Sociology, New York, Volume 53, Issue No. 3, 1 July 1994).
- ‘The Emerging Dilemma of the Urdu Press in India’ (South Asia Journal of South Asian Studies, Australia, Vol. 12, Issue No. 2, 1995).
- ‘Urdu Education in India’ (EPW, vol. 37, January 2002).
- ‘Urdu Language and Education - Need for Political Will and Strategy’ (EPW, vol. 37, Issue No. 25, 22 June 2002).
- With Hasan Abdullah ‘Facing the RSS Challenge’ (EPW, vol. 37, June 2002).
- ‘The Distortionists’ (Outlook, 2 November 2004).
- ‘Who's the Real Muslim?’ (Outlook, 6 December 2004).
- ‘Friends and Foes’ (TOI, 18 April 2005).
- ‘The great Urdu fraud’, Part-I (The Milli Gazette, New Delhi, 1–15 May 2005)
- ‘The great Urdu fraud’, Part-II (The Milli Gazette, New Delhi, 16–31 May 2005)
- ‘The emerging dilemma of the Urdu press in India: A viewpoint’ (South Asia: Journal of South Asia Studies, Vol. 18, Issue 2, 1995), Published online (www.tandfonline.com, 8 May 2007).
- ‘Triple Talaq Isn't Islamic’ (TOI, 16 July 2007).
- ‘Triple Talaq Isn't Islamic’ (www.defence.pk, 16 July 2007).
- ‘Indian Muslim's Dilemma’ (TOI, 31 December 2007).
- 'The Gentle Zephyr’ (Outlook, 28 April 2008).
- ‘It's Daylight Robbery’ (TOI, 28 July 2008).
- ‘Pariahs in Our Own Home’ (TOI, 23 April 2009).
- ‘Riyadh Diary’ (Outlook Weekly, New Delhi, 29 March 2010).
- Dr. Abdul Jalil Faridi: A Lost Chapter in the History of the Ruthless, Obscurantist Urdu Politics of North India by Ather Farouqui, translated by Yoginder Sikand for newageislam.com (23 November 2010).
- ‘Syed Shahabuddin on his life and Politics’ exclusive interview by Dr. Ather Farouqui (Newageislam.com, 15 February 2011).
- ‘Islamic Banking: An Anathema to Civil Society’ (EPW, Vol. 46, 7 May 2011).
- ‘Islamic Banking in India at the Service of Pan-Islamists’ (Mainstream, vol. 11, 3 March 2012)
- Urdu needs Kiss of Life and not Myopic Policies – Ather Farouqui (Mainstream, New Delhi Vol. No. 33, 4 August 2012)
- My Second Innings: "Battling" for Urdu with the Chief Minister of Delhi – Ather Farouqui (Mainstream, New Delhi Vol. No. 40, 21 September 2013)
- ‘It Is Majoritarianism That Needs To Be Contested’ – Ather Farouqui Interviews Ayesha Jalal (Outlookindia, 24 June 2014)
- ‘Inner History of a Lost Culture’ (IIC Quarterly, Volume 44, No. 1, Summer 2017)
- 'Developing Linkage between the Muslim Mind and National Polity' – Syed Shahabuddin's Interview with Ather Farouqui (Mainstream, New Delhi Vol. No. 13, 18 March 2017).
- ‘In the Family Way’ (TOI 6, September 2017)
- ‘Delhi Diary’ (Mainstream, New Delhi Vol. No. 38, 5 September 2020).
- ‘Urdu’: Not a Language but the City of Shajahanabad (IIC Quarterly, Autumn 2020).
- The Denial of Prophecy and a Tryst with History: Salman Rushdie's Midnight's Children (IIC Quarterly, Summer 2021).
- 'Playing English' -The Politics of Identity and Space in Vikram Seth's 'An Equal Music' (IIC Quarterly, Vol. 49, No.1, Summer 22)
- Uncovering Political Dynamics in Pakistan: Analysing Mohammed Hanif's A Case of Exploding Mangoes (IIC Quarterly, Vol. 50, No. 2, Autumn 2023)
