= Nizam Siddiqui =

Nizam Siddiqui is an Indian Allahabad-based author writing in Urdu. He did his schooling from the Anglo Bengali Inter College and graduate and post-graduate work at Kanpur University. In 2013, He has received Sahitya Akademi Translation Prize for translating Manohar Shyam Joshi's Hindi novel Kyap into Urdu. His literary critique Mabad-e-Jadidiat Se Naye Ahed Ki Takhliqiyat Tak won the 2016 Sahitya Akademi Award for Urdu. In addition to this work, he has created seven works of fiction and two books on criticism
