= Salam Bin Razzaq =

Indian writer and translator (1941–2024)

Shaikh Abdussalam Abdurrazzaq (1941 – 7 May 2024), known by his pen name Salam Bin Razzaq, was an Indian Urdu and Hindi short story writer and translator who was based in Mumbai. His short story collection Shikasta Buton Ke Darmiyan won the 2004 Sahitya Akademi Award for Urdu. He died at his home in Navi Mumbai on 7 May 2024, at the age of 83. He was taken care by his wife named Zahid Begum Shaikh and son named Suhel Ahmed Shaikh.
