= Rajendra Kishore Panda =

Indian novelist and poet (1944–2025)

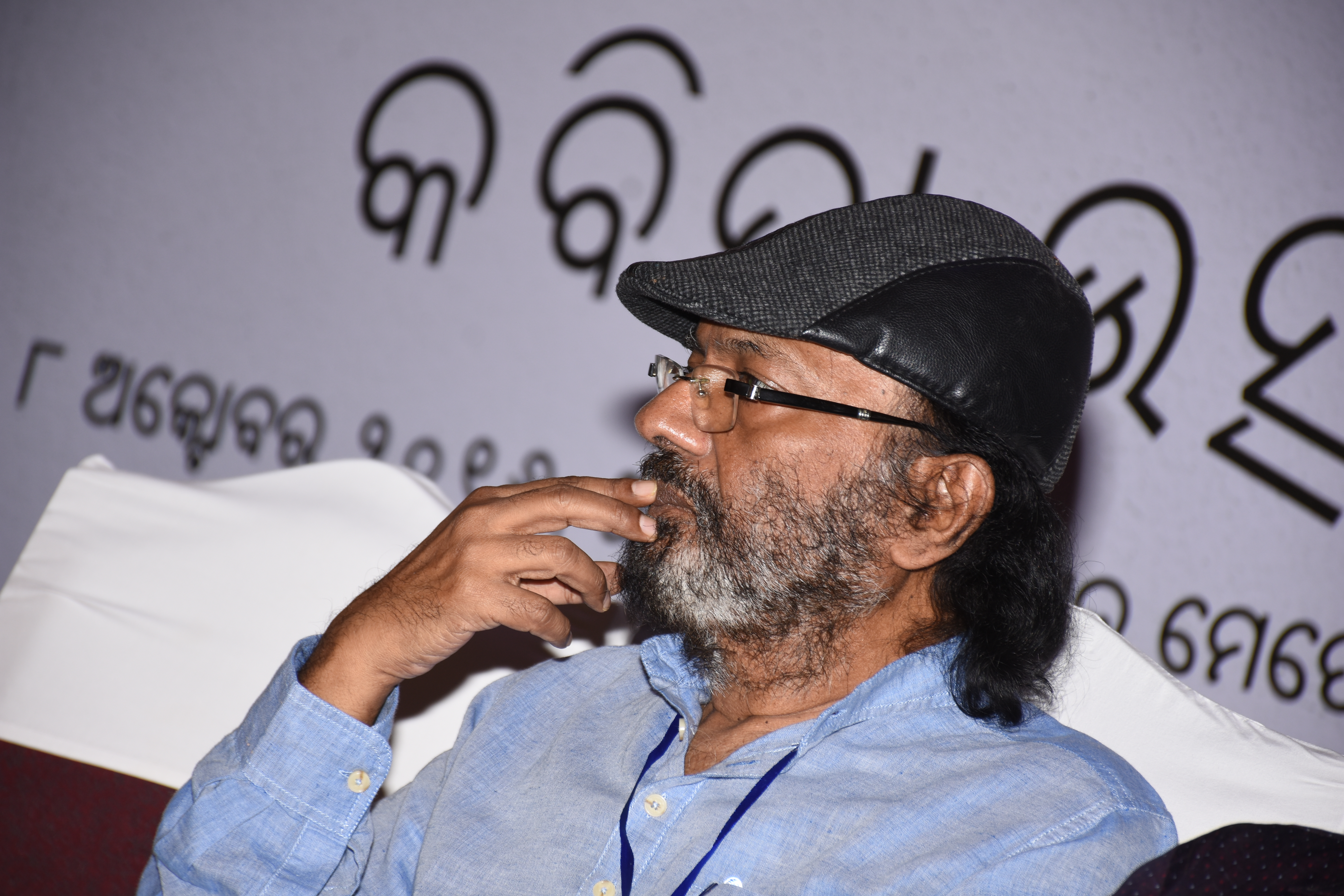
Panda in 2016

Rajendra Kishore Panda (24 or 29 June 1944 – 24 October 2025) was an Indian Odia language poet and novelist.

== Life and career ==
Panda was born on either 24 or 29 June 1944 in Natasha, a village Sambalpur district of Orissa Province. He earned a Master of Arts degree from the University of Allahabad.

He published 16 poetry collections. Panda was awarded the Gangadhar National Award in 2010, and the Sahitya Akademi Award in 1985. He received the Kuvempu Rashtriya Puraskar for 2020.

Panda died on 24 October 2025, at the age of 81.

== Works ==
Panda's first collection of poems, Gaun Devata (Minor Gods), was published in 1947.

== Books ==
=== Poetry collections ===
- Gouna Devata (1975)
- Anavatar O Anya Anya (1976)
- Ghunakshara (1977)
- Satadru Anek (1977)
- Nija Pain Nanabaya (1980)
- Choukathhare Chirakala (1981)
- Shailakalpa (1982)
- Anya (1988)
- Ishakhela (1999)
- Bahubreehi (1991)
- Collected Poems (2003)
- Drohavakya (2003)
- Dujanari (2003)
- Vairagi Bhramar (2003)
- Satyottara (2003)
- Bahwarambhe (2003)

=== Novels ===
- Chidabhas (1999)
- " PYTHON"

== Honours ==
In 2004, Panda was awarded a D.Lit. by Sambalpur University. He was awarded the Gangadhar National Award in 2010, and the Sahitya Akademi Award in 1985 for his book Shailakalpa.

== See also ==
- List of Odia writers
