= Kutchmitra =

Indian newspaper

- Type: Daily
- Format: Broadsheet
- Owner: Janmabhoomi Media group
- Founder: Janmabhoomi Media group
- Publisher: Janmabhoomi Media group
- Founded: 1947
- Political alignment: Centre-Left
- Language: Gujarati
- City: Bhuj, Kutch district, Gujarat
- Country: India
- Website: www.kutchmitradaily.com
- Free online archives: www.kutchmitradaily.com/epaper.aspx

Kutchmitra is a Gujarati language daily published from Bhuj, Kutch district, Gujarat, India. It is owned by the Janmabhoomi media group.
