= Namdev Tarachandani =

Sindhi language writer and scholar of India

- Born: 25 November 1946 (age 79); Lukman, British India (now in Khairpur district, Pakistan)
- Occupations: poet, writer, scholar
- Writing career
- Language: Sindhi
- Notable awards: Sahitya Akademi Award (2013)
- Website: Official website

Namdev Tarachandani is a Sindhi language writer and scholar from India. He lives in Vadodara, Gujarat, India. He was born on 25 November 1946 in Lukman (now in Khairpur district, Pakistan).

Jora-Kata (1974) is a novel written by him. It is translated into Gujarati as Vatta-Ochha (1980). Vikhoon (1981) and Paglan (1991) are his collections of short story while Athon-Sur (1984) and Manush Nagri (2011) are his poetry collections. His critical works includes Sindhi Katha Sahitya (2004) and Sach Chavan Ji Chhoot (2011). He received Sahitya Akademi Award (2013) for his book Manush Nagri. He also received the Sahitya Gaurav Puraskar for Sindhi language in 2011.
