= Balraj Komal =

Indian poet and author (1928–2013)

- Born: 25 September 1928; India
- Died: 2013 (aged 84–85)
- Occupations: Poet, writer
- Spouse: Gargi Komal
- Awards: Padma Shri; Sahitya Akademi Award; Uttar Pradesh Urdu Academy Award

Balraj Komal (1928–2013) was an Indian poet and writer of Urdu literature. The Government of India honored Komal in 2011, with the fourth highest civilian award of Padma Shri.

== Biography ==
Balraj Komal, born in 1928, was a freelance writer after his retirement from the Delhi Administration as an Education Officer. He was a former member of Delhi Urdu Akademi and the advisory board of Sahitya Akademi, New Delhi. He is credited with several publications composed of poems, short stories, and critical studies and Meri Nazmen, Parindon Bhara Aasman, Rishta-e-Dil, Agala Waraq, Ankhen Aur Paon, and Adab ki Talas are some hid known works.

A recipient of the Sahitya Akademi Award in 1985, Balraj Komal also won Uttar Pradesh Urdu Academy Award twice(1971 and 1982) and has also received a Senior Fellowship from the Government of India. In 2011, the Government of India honored Komal again by including him in the Republic Day honours list for Padma Award.

Balraj Komal died in 2013 at the age of 85.
