= List of Sindhi-language poets =

This is a list of Sindhi language poets.

== A ==
- Adal Soomro
- Ahmad Khan Madhosh
- Ali Gul Sangi
- Allah Baksh Sarshar Uqaili
- Anwar Peerzada
- Tanveer Abbasi
- Ghulam Ali Allana (academic)

== B ==
- Bedil
- Parwano Bhatti
- Bherumal Meharchand Advani
- Kirat Babani
- Qadir Bux Bedil
- Zulfiqar Ali Bhatti (writer)
- Makhdoom Bilawal
- Ustad Bukhari
- Ameer Bux Shar

== D ==
- Darbadar
- Hassan Dars
- Attiya Dawood

== G ==
- Ghulam Mohammad Grami
- Ayaz Gul

== H ==
- Hakeem Fateh Mohammad Sehwani
- Arjan Hasid

== I ==
- Imdad Hussaini
- Ibrahim Munshi
- Ishaq Samejo

== J ==
- Kamal Jamro
- Ayaz Jani
- Abdul Jabbar Junejo

== K ==
- Khialdas Fani
- Kamal Jamro
- Elsa Kazi
- Khawaja Muhammad Zaman of Luari

== M ==
- Mir Abdul Rasool Mir
- Mirza Qaleech Baig
- Vasdev Mohi
- Muhammad Faquir Khatian
- Moti Prakash
- Rashid Morai
- Muhammad Mohsin Bekas
- Muhammad Siddique Musafir
- Makhdoom Ameen Faheem
- Makhdoom Muhammad Zaman Talibul Moula
- Mohammad Khan Majeedi
- Muhammad Hashim Thattvi
- Mir Abdul Hussain Sangi

== N ==
- Narayan Shyam

== P ==
- Pir Hadi Hassan Bux Shah Jilani
- Pir Sadardin
- Anwar Pirzada

== R ==
- Rohal Faqir

== S ==
- Sachal Sarmast
- Sarkash Sindhi
- Sawan Fakir
- Shah Abdul Latif Bhittai
- Shah Inayat Rizvi
- Shah Inayat Shaheed
- Shaikh Ayaz
- Sobhraj Nirmaldas Fani
- Sabit Ali Shah
- Sami (poet)
- Shah Abdul Karim Bulri
- Shah Inat Rizvi
- Shamsher-ul-Hyderi
- Sufi Budhal Faqeer

== T ==
- Tajal Bewas

== W ==
- Din Muhammad Wafai

== See also ==
- Sindhi poetry
- List of Sindhi poets from India
- Sindhi literature
