= Pakistani poetry =

Pakistan’s tradition of poetry includes Urdu poetry, English poetry, Balochi poetry,, Punjabi poetry, Sindhi poetry, Pashto poetry, Saraiki poetry, and Kashmiri poetry. Sufi poetry has a strong tradition in Pakistan and the poetry of popular Sufi poets is often recited and sung.

== Urdu poets ==
- Ahmad Faraz – Pakistani poet (1931–2008)
- Ahmad Nadeem Qasmi – Pakistani writer (1916-2006)
- Amjad Islam Amjad – Pakistani poet and lyricist (1944–2023)
- Faiz Ahmed Faiz – Pakistani poet and author (1911-1984)
- Parveen Shakir – Pakistani poet (1952–1994)
- Fehmida Riaz – Pakistani writer and activist (1946–2018)
- Habib Jalib – Pakistani poet and political activist (1928–1993)
- Hafeez Jullundhri – Pakistani poet (1900–1982)
- Hakim Ahmad Shuja – Pakistani Urdu and Persian poet (1893–1969)
- Iftikhar Arif – Pakistani poet and litterateur (born 1944)
- Jaun Elia – Pakistani poet (1931–2002)
- Jawayd Anwar – Pakistani poet and writer (1959–2011)
- Josh Malihabadi – Pakistani poet (1898–1982)
- Kishwar Naheed – Pakistani writer
- Majeed Amjad – Punjabi writer, Urdu poet (1914–1974)
- Mehmood Sham – Pakistani journalist
- Moeen Nizami – Pakistani poet (born 1965)
- Mohsin Naqvi (poet) – Pakistani poet (1947-1996)
- Mohsin Bhopali
- Munir Niazi – Pakistani poet (1923–2006)
- Nasir Kazmi – Pakistani poet (1925–1972)
- Qateel Shifai – Pakistani poet and lyricist (1919–2001)
- Shakeb Jalali – Pakistani poet (1934–1966)
- Raees Warsi – Pakistani writer
- Najeeba Arif -- Pakistani writer and poet (1964)

=== Feminist poets ===
- Fehmida Riaz – Pakistani writer and activist (1946–2018)

=== Comical poets ===
- Anwar Masood – Pakistani poet (born 1935)
- Dilawar Figar – Pakistani poet (1929–1998)
- Zamir Jafri – Pakistani poet (1916–1999)

== English poets ==
- Daud Kamal – Pakistani poet (1935–1987)
- Alamgir Hashmi – Anglo-Pakistani poet (born 1951)
- Zulfikar Ghose – American novelist, poet and essayist (1935–2022)
- Shahid Suhrawardy – Bengali diplomat, poet and art critic (1890–1965)
- Maki Kureishi – Pakistani poet
- Kaleem Omar – Pakistani writer
- Athar Tahir – Pakistani civil servant (born 1956)

== Punjabi poets ==
- Pir Naseer-uddin-Naseer – Pakistani Sufi scholar and poet (1949–2009)
- Bulleh Shah – Punjabi philosopher and poet (1680–1757)
- Fariduddin Ganjshakar – Punjabi Muslim preacher and mystic (c. 1188 – 1266)
- Mian Muhammad Bakhsh – Punjabi Sufi poet (c. 1830–1907)
- Waris Shah – Punjabi Sufi Poet (1722–1798)
- Sultan Bahu – Punjabi poet, Sufi mystic, and scholar (1630–1691)
- Khawaja Ghulam Farid – 19th-century Sufi poet (c. 1845–1901)
- Shah Hussain – Punjabi Sufi poet (1538–1599)
- Ustad Daman – Pakistani Punjabi-language poet (1911–1984)

== Saraiki poets ==
- Khawaja Farid – 19th-century Sufi poet (c. 1845–1901)
- Qadir Bux Bedil – 19th-century Sindhi writer and Sufi saint
- Sachal Sarmast – Sindhi sufi mystic and poet (1739–1827)
- Shakir Shuja Abadi – Pakistani Saraiki poet (born c. 1953)

== Sindhi poets ==
- Adal Soomro – Sindhi poet and academic
- Ahmad Khan Madhosh – Sindhi language poet (1931–2010)
- Ali Gul Sangi – Sindhi Language poet
- Bedil – 19th-century Sindhi writer and Sufi saint
- Imdad Hussaini – Pakistani poet (1940–2022)
- Lal Shahbaz Qalander – Sufi saint and poet (1177–1274)
- Makhdoom Ameen Fahim – Pakistani politician
- Makhdoom Muhammad Zaman Talibul Moula – Pakistani politician, scholar and poet
- Mir Abdul Rasool Mir – Sindhi Language poet and educationist (1950–2019)
- Mirza Qaleech Baig – Sindhi literature scholar
- Muhammad Mohsin Bekas – 19th-century Sindhi Sufi poet and saint
- Muhammad Siddique Musafir – Pakistani writer
- Parwano Bhatti – Sindhi-language poet (1934–2016)
- Sarkash Sindhi – Prominent poet of Sindhi language
- Sawan Faqir – Sindhi poet
- Shah Abdul Latif – 18th-century Sindhi Sufi writer
- Sachal Sarmast – Sindhi sufi mystic and poet (1739–1827)
- Tajal Bewas – Pakistani writer, teacher and government official
- Shah Inayatullah – Sindhi Sufi saint and revolutionary (c. 1655–1718)
- Shaikh Ayaz – Sindhi language poet
- Sobhraj Nirmaldas Fani – Indian writer
- Ustad Bukhari – Pakistani poet (1930-1992)

== Pashto poets ==
- Khushal Khan Khattak – Pashtun poet, chief and warrior (1613–1689)
- Rahman Baba – Pashtun Sufi saint and poet (c. 1653–1711)
- Ameer Hamza Shinwari – Afghan Pashto Poet (1907–1994)
- Khan Abdul Ghani Khan – Pashtun poet and philosopher (1914–1996)
- Ajmal Khattak – Pakistani politician (1925–2010)

== Balochi poetry ==
- Gul Khan Nasir – Pakistani politician and writer (1914–1983)

== See also ==
- List of Pakistani writers
