= Shamsher-ul-Hyderi =

Sindhi poet, writer and journalist (1931–2012)

- شمشير الحيدري
- Born: Shamsher Ali; 15 September 1932; Town Kadhan, Badin District, Sindh
- Died: 10 August 2012 (aged 79); Karachi, Sindh
- Education: Master of Arts
- Alma mater: University of Sindh, Jamshoro
- Occupations: Poet, journalist
- Writing career
- Pen name: "شمشير"
- Genre: Aesthetic
- Notable work: Poetry
- Notable awards: Pride of Performance Award by the President of Pakistan in 2000

Shamsher-ul-Hyderi (Sindhi: شمشير الحيدري) (15 September 1932 – 10 August 2012) was a Sindhi poet, writer and journalist.

== Early life and education ==
Shamsher-ul-Hyderi was born on 15 September 1932 in the Kadhan (Sindhi: ڪڍڻ) town of Badin District, Sindh. After an early education in his native village, Shamsher-ul-Hyderi briefly attended Sindh Madressatul Islam University in Karachi before graduating with both BA and MA degrees in Sindhi from the University of Sindh in Jamshoro.

== Professional career ==
He began his professional writing career in 1951. During his professional career, Shamsher-ul-Hyderi held a variety of jobs. His various employers included: the Pakistan Public Works Department (as clerk), the Cooperative Bank in Badin (as manager), the Sindhi Adabi Board (as clerk, and in 1993, as secretary), Mehran magazine (as editor), Naee Zindagi Monthly magazine (as editor), the Pakistan National Shipping Corporation (as publishing manager), Daily Mehran newspaper (as editor), and Daily Hilal Pakistan newspaper (as editor).

"He was the first Sindhi newscaster, TV anchor, writer of drama and he produced and directed two documentary films on Thatta and Makli'.

Shamsher was a lifetime member of Karachi Press Club and Arts Council of Pakistan Karachi.

He also wrote nearly 100 plays for Pakistani television for 38 years both in Sindhi and Urdu languages. Shamsher was a television anchorperson in Sindhi language as well.

Shamsher started working for the government of Pakistan in 1956 and finally retired from the Ministry of Information and Broadcasting in 1991.

== Literary career ==
Shamsher-ul-Hyderi's appreciation of literature began with an introduction from his maternal uncle Nazeer Hyderi. He was later guided by the scholars Maulana Ghulam Mohammad Grami and Muhammad Ibrahim Joyo. Shamsher also served as Secretary General of Sindhi Adabi Board for 10 years where he translated and edited more than 250 books.

== Publications ==
Shamsher-ul-Hyderi mostly composed free verse, and was considered to be a pioneer in free verse poetry.

- Laat (Sindhi: لاٽ) (Poetry:1962)
- Insan Kamil (Sindhi: انسان ڪامل) (1953)
- Karwan Karbala (1954)
- Poras Ja Hathi (Sindhi: پورس جا هاٿي) (Stories: 1958)
- Tuhinjun Galhiyun Sajan (Sindhi: تنهنجون ڳالهيون سڄڻ) (1961)
- Kak Mahal

== Awards ==
Shamsher-ul-Hyderi was awarded over 60 literary, cultural and journalistic awards from Pakistan, India and the United States including:

- On 14 August 2000, the Government of Pakistan bestowed on Shamsher-ul-Hyderi the Pride of Performance award.

== Death ==
Shamsher-ul-Hyderi died of cancer in Karachi on 10 August 2012 at the age of 79.

He was buried at Chaukhandi graveyard. Sindh Minister of Culture Sassui Palijo and literary figures of Sindh Ayaz Gul, Adal Soomro and Jami Chandio paid tributes to him.
