= Terrorist incidents in Pakistan in 2015 =

Terrorist Attacks in Pakistan in 2015
Date	10 January 2015 – 29 December 2015 (11 months, 2 weeks and 5 days)
Location	Pakistan
Result	Over

Belligerents
Pakistan	Terrorists

Commanders and leaders
Gen Qamar Javed Bajwa	Fazlullah Hayat

Strength
unknown	unknown

Casualties and losses
77 Soldiers killed: 12 killed in Jan; 4 killed in Feb; 2 killed in Mar; 7 killed in June; 4 killed in July; 6 killed in Aug; 32 killed in Sep; 32 Cops killed: 7 killed in Jan; 4 killed in Feb; 1 killed in Mar; 1 killed in Apr; 5 killed in May; 9 killed in Jun; 1 killed in July; 4 killed in Aug; 287 Civilians killed: 63 killed in Jan; 33 killed in Feb; 21 killed in Mar; 25 killed in Apr; 74 killed in May; 13 killed in Jun; 11 killed in July; 24 killed in Aug; 23 killed in Sep	979 killed: 132 killed in Jan; 50 killed Feb; 80 killed in Mar; 148 killed in Apr; 113 killed in May; 148 killed in Jun; 64 killed in July; 201 killed in Aug; 59 killed in Sep

This is a list of terrorist incidents in Pakistan in 2015.

== January ==
9 January – Time bomb in drainpipe explosion killed at least eight people took place near Imambargah Aun Muhammad Rizvi in Rawalpindi s Chatian Hattian area

13 January – Insurgents shoot and killed at least 7 security forces and 2 others were wounded in Loralai District, Balochistan.

14 January — At least 2 security personnel killed and another 3 were wounded after a vehicle hit a landmine in Kurram Agency, Federally Administered Tribal Areas.

16 January — At least 1 person killed and 8 were wounded in a remote control blast in chani goth area of bahawalpur Bahawalpur District, Punjab.

30 January — At least 53 people have been killed in a bomb blast at a Shia mosque in southern Pakistan.

== February ==
1 February – : A landmine explosion killed a captain and injured two personnel of FC Balochistan on Sunday evening in Balochistan's Naseerabad district.

13 February – At least 19 dead as Taliban militants storm Pak Shiite mosque in Peshawar.

17 February – At least 8 people were killed in a blast near Police Lines in Qila Gujar Singh area of Lahore on Tuesday and 19 others injured.

18 February – 3 people were killed and several injured in an explosion at Qasar-e-Sakina Imambargah on Kurri Road, Rawalpindi located at Islamabad Expressway.

24 February — Bomb killed at least one and another 8 were injured in Chaman district, Balochistan.

== March ==
15 March – Suicide Bombers belonging to the terror outfit Tehrik-i-Taliban Pakistan targeted two churches in the Christian neighborhood of Youhana Abad, Lahore as worshippers were gathering for Sunday mass. At least fourteen people were killed in the blasts and another 70 were reported injured.

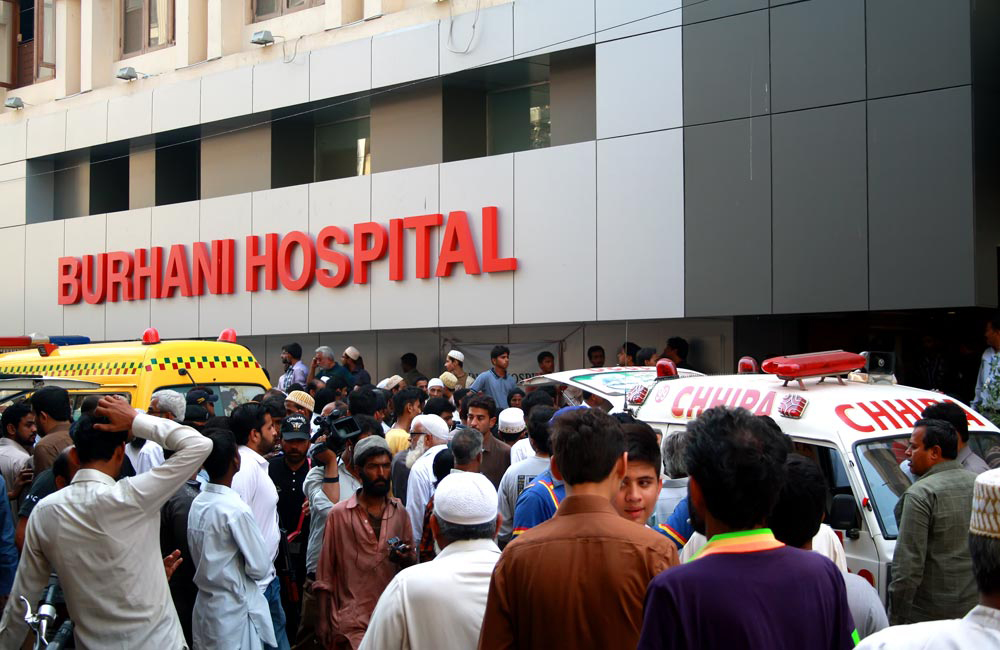
20 March attack in Karachi

20 March – At least 2 people have been killed and 7 wounded after a bomb planted on a motorcycle exploded outside a mosque in Pakistan's largest city Karachi, police have said.

27 March – Lt Col FC Alamdar Hussain, killed in an ambush at Sibi Tali Gang Road Balochistan during Survey of Area.

== April ==
11 April – Militants gun down 20 laborers and injure 3 others in Turbat's Gogdan area in Balochistan.

24 April – Social activist, Sabeen Mahmud is murdered in Karachi after hosting a session on the disappeared people of Balochistan at T2F (The Second Floor), the cafe and discussion space she founded.

== May ==
4 May – Lt Col Ahsan(5AK) 82 Wing Commander & 3 troops injured in two different ambushes on Turbat-Buleda Mand road Balochistan.

25 May- In the village of Sambrial (Majra khurd) 8 people were killed at the cricket final...some were injured. They were 12 people with black mask and started firings during the match final. People's still considering that's they were Taliban's.

13 May — 46 people were killed when eight gunmen attacked a bus a Karachi. Most of the victims belonged to the Ismaili, Shia minority.

29 May — 35 people are forced off a bus and kidnapped by members of the United Baluch Army. 23 of those passengers were killed.

== August ==
16 August — 14 people, including the Punjab home minister Shuja Khanzada died in the suicide blast in Shadi Khan village.

== September ==
13 September — At least 10 people died when an explosion occurred near a packed rickshaw stand in Multan.

18 September — At least 29 people, including an army captain, were killed as militants attacked a Pakistan Air Force base in Badhaber area on the outskirts of Peshawar.

== October ==
- 14 October - 09 people were killed in blast in Taunsa sharif District Dera ghazi Khan Punjab.
- 19 October — At least 11 people were killed and another 22 were wounded after a bomb exploded in a bus in Quetta, Balochistan.
- 23 October - 2015 Jacobabad bombing

== December ==
13 December — A bombing occurred at a clothes bazaar in Pakistan's Parachinar area in the Kurram Valley. It was not clear whether the bombing was a suicide attack or a remotely controlled detonation. The blast killed 23 people and another 30 were injured.

23 Dec – Lt Col Haroon Mazhar wing commander 125 Makran scout got injured during action near Dasht Baluchistan.

29 December — Mardan Suicide Bombing. At least 26 killed, 56 injured in suicide blast at NADRA office in Mardan.

== See also ==
- 2015 in Pakistan
- Terrorism in Pakistan
- List of terrorist incidents, 2015
