= Dodo Chanesar =

Sindhi ballad

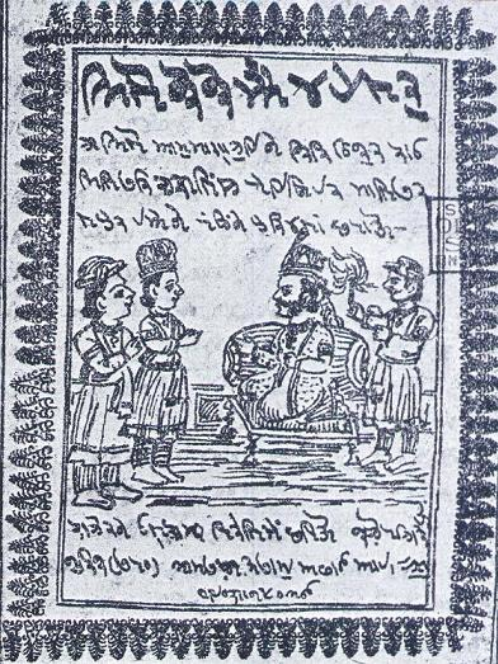
- Dodo Chanesar In Khudabadi script

Dodo Chanesar (Sindhi: دودو چنيسر) is a Sindhi ballad, set during the Soomro dynasty. The ballad is semi-historical in nature and a very importance source of information on medieval Sindh. It was preserved orally by professional minstrels over the centuries.

== Synopsis ==
Dodo Bin Bhongar (Dodo I) had two wives, one from a (Luhar) blacksmith and another from rajput lineage. Former gave birth to two children, A son Chanesar and daughter Bilqees Bhaagi. Later gave birth to a son that was named Dodo (II) after his father who recently fell in a battle.

Bhongar (father of Dodo I) ruled the kingdom after fall of Dodo as a regent. After the death of Bhongar, nobles gather to pick the next monarch. Despite attempts by Bhaagi to make his brother first-born Chanesar the next king, noblemen choose Dodo over Chanesar because of his noble rajput birth.

In resentment Chanesar went to Delhi to seek help of then ruler Alauddin Khilji to overthrow his brother. When negotiation failed, ensuing battle was inevitable. Despite heroic defence, odds were against the sindhi army. Dodo along with sindhi armies fell. Even being impaled high, Dodo was taunting Chanesar over his cowardliness. It is said even in death Dodo did not relinquish hold on sword.

Episode made Chanesar understand the vile nature of Turks, he turned on and died fighting as well.

== In popular culture ==
Renowned Sindhi poet Sheikh Ayaz wrote a play "Doday Soomray Jo Maut" based on ballad of Dodo Chanesar.

== See also ==
- Dodo Soomro's Death
