= Madhosh =

Madhosh (lit. 'intoxicated') may refer to:

- Madhosh (1951 film), a 1951 Bollywood romance film by J. B. H. Wadia, starring Manhar Desai and Meena Kumari
- Madhosh (1974 film), a 1974 Bollywood drama film by Desh Gautam, starring Mahendra Sandhu and Reena Roy
- Madhosh (1994 film), a 1994 Bollywood musical romance film by Vikram Bhatt
- Madhosh Balhami, an Indian poet
- Ahmad Khan Madhosh (1931–2010), Sindhi-language poet from Pakistan

== See also ==
- Madhoshi, a 2004 Bollywood film
