= Athar Tahir =

Pakistani civil servant (born 1956)

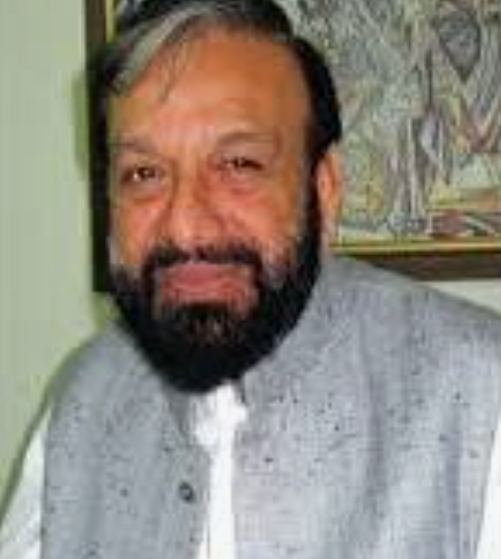
- Athar Tahir
- Born: Faisalabad, Punjab, Pakistan
- Occupations: poet, author, painter

M. Athar Tahir (born 1956) is a Pakistani former civil servant who is also a poet, author, translator, painter and calligrapher.

== Recognition ==
He won the National Book Council Prize in 1991.

== Writings ==
Athar Tahir has authored several acclaimed works of poetry, essays, translation, and fiction in both English and Urdu. His writing is known for its imagist precision, classical form (particularly sonnets), and themes including love, mysticism, loss, and cultural identity.

=== Poetry (English) ===
- Yielding Years (2002) – A collection that won the Patras Bokhari Literary Award from the Pakistan Academy of Letters.
- The Gift of Possession (2010) – Also awarded the Patras Bokhari Award.
- The Last Tea (2015) – A poetry collection praised for its conciseness and depth.
- Telling Twilight: Seven Score Sonnets (2024) – A sequence of 140 sonnets exploring aging, memory, and mysticism.

=== Poetry (Urdu and Bilingual) ===
- Body Loom – A bilingual collection of Urdu poems.
- A Certain Season – A selection of English poems, published by Oxford University Press.
- Punjab Portraits, Pakistan Colours, and Lahore Colours – Poetic and visual blends of cultural and historical commentary.

=== Fiction ===
- Second Coming (2023) – A novel that follows the inner life of an aging protagonist confronting desire, time, and memory. Published by Lighthouse Publishers.

=== Criticism and Scholarship ===
- Qadir Yar: A Critical Introduction (1988) – A scholarly monograph on the Punjabi poet Qadir Yar, published by the Punjab Adabi Board.

=== Editorial and Institutional Work ===
- Founding Director of the International Centre for Pakistani Writing in English at Kinnaird College, Lahore.
- Editor of The Oxford Companion to Pakistani Art (forthcoming from Oxford University Press)

== See also ==
- Pakistani poetry
- List of Pakistani writers
- Daud Kamal
- Alamgir Hashmi
- Omer Tarin
