= Encyclopedia Sindhiana =

Encyclopedia Sindhiana Sindhi: انسائيڪلوپيڊيا سنڌيانا
- Language: Sindhi
- Genre: Encyclopedia
- Publisher: Sindhi Language Authority
- Publication place: Pakistan
- Pages: 11 Volumes

Encyclopedia Sindhiana (Sindhi: انسائيڪلوپيڊيا سنڌيانا), published by the Sindhi Language Authority in Pakistan, is a general knowledge encyclopedia specially covering a wide range of information regarding Sindh. A total of fifteen volumes are planned to be published.

This encyclopedia was conceived and its framework structure was prepared by the poet Tanveer Abbasi who later died without seeing it materialized. However, the online encyclopedia is 'dedicated' to him. Sindhi Language Authority,

About eighty percent of the content is about Sindh, while the rest covers different important topics relating to the world and the universe.

== History ==
The Encyclopedia Sindhiana is a project of the Sindhi Language Authority. The project was initially started under the supervision of Ghulam Ali Allana but was soon discontinued for unknown reasons. It was restarted during chairpersonship of Dr Fahmida Hussain in July 2008 to 13 March 2015. Badar Abro was made first Project Director of Encyclopedia Sindhiana, who was later replaced by Muhammad Usman Memon who remained project Director of 'Encyclopedia Sindhiana' till 2019 and he completed 12 Volumes of 'Encyclopedia Sindhiana'.

In early 2025, work on Volume 13 is being supervised by Khan Muhammad Jarwar.

== Volumes ==
As of early 2025, twelve volumes have been published. The first volume was published in 2009, while latest addition to this is eleventh volume which was published in August 2017. Collectively they cover first 29 letters of Sindhi alphabet (Sindhi: ا-ش).

=== Volume 1 ===
This volume was published in 2009 and covers first three letters of Sindhi alphabet (Sindhi: ا، ب، ٻ). It has 3500 entries and is spread upon about 650 pages.

=== Volume 2 ===
The second volume consisting of 728 pages includes about 2571 entries based upon six letters of Sindhi alphabet from four to nine (Sindhi: ڀ،ت،ٿ،ٽ،ٺ،ث). This volume was published in 2010.

=== Volume 3 ===
This volume, published in 2011, covers two letters (Sindhi: پ، ج) and has 2533 entries. Number of pages in this volume is 700.

=== Volume 4 ===
Volume four covers next seven letters of Sindhi alphabet (Sindhi: ڄ، جهه، ڃ، چ، ڇ، ح، خ) and has 2033 entries. This volume has 608 pages and was published in 2012.

=== Volume 5 ===
Volume five, published in 2012, covers six letters of Sindhi alphabet (Sindhi: د، ڌ، ڏ، ڊ، ڍ، ذ) and has 1930 entries.

=== Volume 6 ===
This volume was published in 2013. It contains entries from three letters (Sindhi: ر، ڙ، ز).

=== Volumes 7 and 8 ===
These two volumes collectively cover one letter of Sindhi alphabet (Sindhi: س)and have 2438 entries in total. Both were published in 2013.

=== Volume 10 ===
This volume of Sindhiana was published in 2016. it contains entries of Sindhi alphabet (Sindhi: ش) and have 508 pages.

=== Volume 11 ===
"In Volume Eleven, there are 420 entries on various topics, including photographs. This volume consists of 450 pages and was published in August 2017."

=== Volume 12 ===
This was published in book form in 2025.

== See also ==
- History of Sindh
- Sindhology
- Chach Nama
- Sindhi Wikipedia
