= Adal Soomro =

Sindhi poet and academic

Dr. Adal Soomro
- ادل سومرو
- Born: Abdul Karim Soomro
- Occupation: Poet
- Writing career
- Language: Sindhi

Dr. Adal Soomro (born Abdul Karim Soomro, 15 August 1955) is a Sindhi language poet and retired academic. He was Director Shaikh Ayaz Chair at Shah Abdul Latif University in Khairpur, Pakistan.

He holds a Ph.D. in the history of Sindhi Adabi Sangat, a Pakistani literary organization for which he has also been Secretary.

Soomro has written 12 books as of 2016: one book of prose, three poetry collections, and eight works of children's literature and poetry. When asked about writing in other languages, he explained that because people dream in their native tongue, they express themselves most effectively through it and that preferring to work in a different language would leave his own vulnerable. Commenting on the longevity of poetic works, and the challenges young poets face, he said they must combine artistic merit with thought without becoming repetitive.

== Views ==
Soomro advocates the abolition of the feudal system and educating men to empower women. He strongly condemns terrorism. Following the 2015 Jacobabad bombing that targeted a procession of Shia Muslims on Muharram 9, he criticized the law enforcement agencies for the security lapse.
