= Narayan Shyam =

Indian Sindhi language poet

- Born: 22 July 1922; Tehsil Nowshero Feroze, Nawabshah District, Bombay Presidency, British India
- Died: 10 January 1989 (aged 66); Bombay, Maharashtra, India
- Education: Bombay University
- Occupation: poet
- Children: 8
- Writing career
- Genres: Prose, poetry
- Notable works: Maak Bhina Rabel, Wari-a-Bhariyo Paland, Aachhinde Laj Maran, Mahiki Vel Subah ji, Dat Ain Hayat
- Notable awards: Sahitya Akademi Award (1970) from Sahitya Akademi

Narayan Gokaldas Nagwani a.k.a. Narayan Shyam or Narain Shyam (22 July 1922 – 10 January 1989) was a Sindhi language poet from India. He was one of the foremost poets associated with the progressive movement. He was awarded the Sahtia Academy Award in 1970 for Sindhi Literature by Sahtia Academy, India for his poetry collection.

== Early life ==
Narain Shyam was born on 22 July 1922 in Goth Khahi Qasim, Tehsil Nowshero Feroze, Nawabshah District, Sindh), Bombay Presidency. He received his early education in Nawabshah. He obtained his BA (Hons) degree from Bombay University in 1943. His optional subject in BA (Hons) was Persian. He became a teacher of Persian in Muslim Madrasa School Nowshero Feroz, where he taught until October 1947. After the partition of India in January 1948 he moved to Bombay, India. He also stayed in Ajmer. Employed in the Post and Telegraph Department in India. He was a very important and representative poet of the progressive school of Sindhi poetry. Narain Shyam played an important role in consolidating progressive ideas, concepts and trends in Sindhi poetry. The maturity of social and political consciousness is evident in his poetry. Narayan has been associated with freedom and public welfare movements, so his speech clearly reflects modern objectivity. Rare expressions in his style of poetry, the waves of influence seem to merge. Narayan Shyam's study was extensive, he had a keen eye on world literature. He was fully aware of the wide-ranging changes taking place in world literature and was also aware of the changing role of literature, which is why his poetry plays a very serious social role instead of a hobby. Narain is one of the foremost Sindhi poets who has successfully experimented with the ancient genres of Sindhi literature i.e. Wai (Vaee), Kafi and Bait etc, as well as he has done certain genres of Western poetry such as Blank Verses, Free Verses and Sonnet. He has given more energy and color to the distention of Sindhi poetry. Narain has successfully experimented with three short stanzas in Sindhi poetry in the style of Japanese genre of haiku, which is an addition to Sindhi poetry. In recognition of his literary services, the Narain Shyam Award, a literary award in his name, has been launched in India, which is given to poetry collections published in Sindhi language.

=== Marriage ===
He married from the Raisinghanis, a famous Sahiti family in the year 1940. He had four sons and four daughters.

== Literary work ==
He created free verses, blank verses and sonnet.

He had number of literary work publication to his credit, following are some of the most significant literary work:

1. Maak Bhina Rabel (Sindhi: ماڪَ ڀِنا رابيل) (Rabel (flower) wet with dew), Poetry, 1964.
2. Wari-a-Bhariyo Paland (Sindhi: واريءَ ڀريو پَلاندُ) (Sand in lap), Poetry, 1968.
3. Aachhinde Laj Maran (Sindhi: آڇيندي لَڄَ مَران) (Feel embarrassed whilst offering), Poetry, 1972.
4. Mahiki Vel Subah ji (Sindhi: مَهڪي ويلَ صُبح جي) (Lovely morning), Poetry, 1983.
5. Dat Ain Hayat (Sindhi: ڏات ۽ حيات) (Divine gift & life), Poetry, 1988.

== Death ==
Narayan Shyam died on 10 January 1989 in Bombay, India.
