= Dodo Soomro's Death =

Sindhi play by Shiekh Ayaz

Dodo Soomro's Death (Sindhi: دودي سومري جو موت, romanized: Doday Soomray Jo Maut) is a poetic play based on the classical Sindhi ballad Dodo Chanesar written by Sindhi poet Shiekh Ayaz. Play was written in 1970 and it contains themes of heroism, nationalism and sufism.

== Translation ==
A partial English translation of the work covering all major themes was done by Noor Ahmed Janjhi, published in 2021 (along with complete Sindhi text).

== Influence ==
Dodo Soomro's Death was written to influence and raise political consciousness of Sindhi youth.

Lines from the opera are still being used by nationalists and civil society alike.

A popular couplet at the end of the play, when Dodo is fallen and is taunted by Chanesar that if he had abdicated in his favour, he never would have faced this fate. Dodo said:

ڇا به چوين مان مڙڻو ناهيان
ويس مٽائي ورڻو آهيان
تو به چنيسر جو ڪجهه چاهين
مون کان آگ ۾ ورڻو آهين
نانو نئين سان، ويس بدل سان
تنهنجي منهنجي جنگ ازل کان
جاري آهي، جاري رهندي
جاري آهي، جاري رهندي

Translation:

Whatsoever you may say, I will not die away.
I shall come back (with new attire)
Whatever Chanesar you had desired (is not gonna fulfilled),
(Laughing) You will die before my last breath.
With new name and with different attire,
It is the longstanding fight between us (Battle of good and bad)
and it is and will continue to the end.

Last lines have been used (with minor changes) as slogan by nationalist and more recently in Aurat March Sindh.

== Reception ==
Professor Noor Ahmed Janjhi on launch of his book on the opera said about the play:

Ayaz depicted his ideas about freedom of thought and human honour and also portrayed sorrows and sufferings of Sindh and the marginalized people. He values love and extends his love to Sindh, its people and the whole world.

Muhammad Ibrahim Joyo said Opera Doday je Moat is a drama imbued with symbolism. It has old characters as well as the characters of present day:

The opera represents two theories about life and death on the field of national struggle. One ideology that contain fear of death and attraction to life so much that man wants to live and to enjoy life at any cost. All the values of honour and dishonour or other moral values pertaining to individual collectivity become meaningless for him. The other ideology that contains such a great love and affection for life carelessness and unmindfulness towards death that man opts death for sake of life. People associated with both considerations want to have good and beautiful things of life...
