= Sindhi Wikipedia =

Sindhi-language edition of Wikipedia

Sindhi Wikipedia سنڌي وڪيپيڊيا

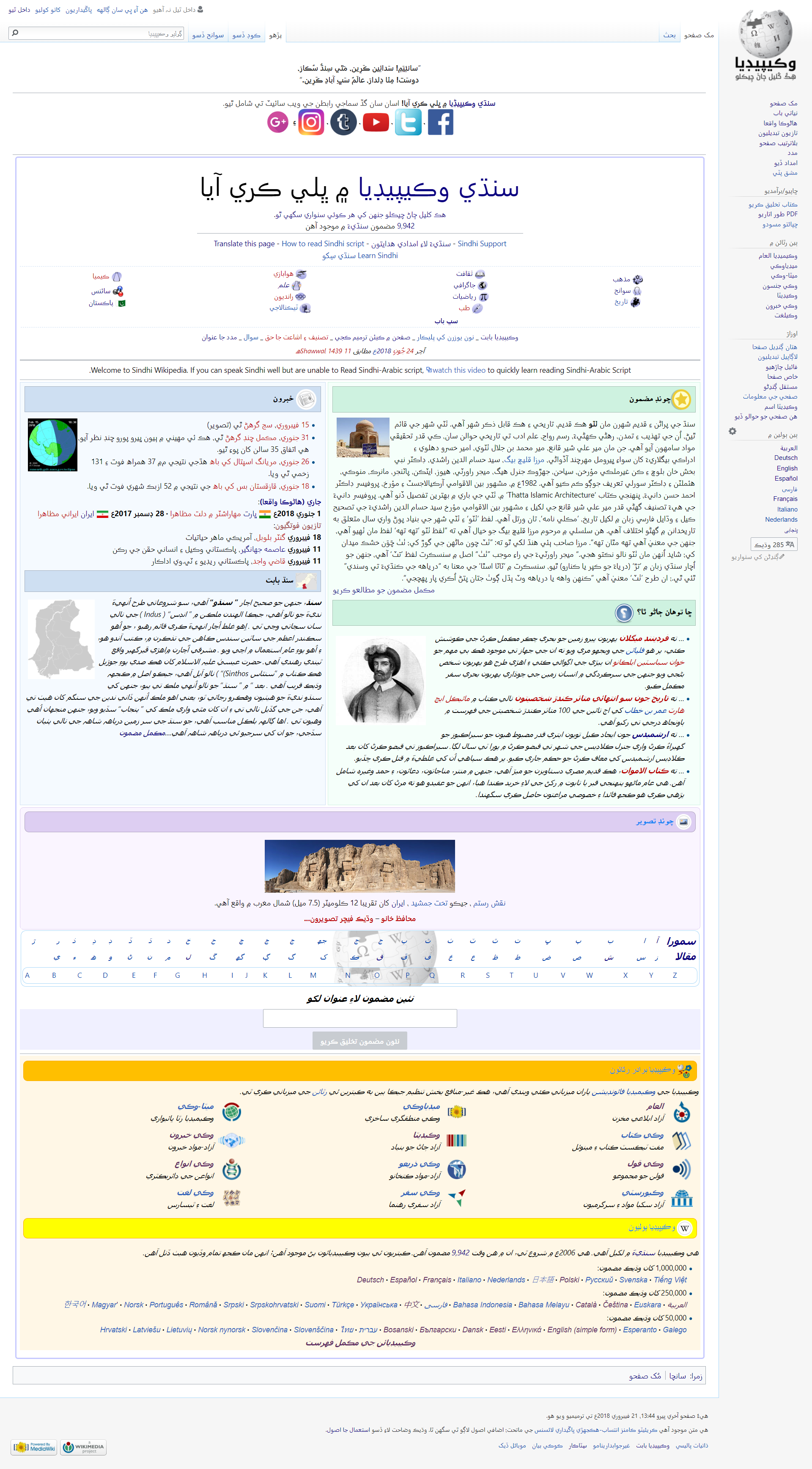
- Screenshot Screenshot of the main page of Wikipedia Sindhi
- Website type: Internet encyclopedia project
- Available in: Sindhi
- Headquarters: Miami, Florida
- Owner: Wikimedia Foundation
- Website: sd.wikipedia.org
- Commercial: No
- Registration: Optional
- Launched: 6 February 2006; 20 years ago
- Content license: Creative Commons Attribution/ Share-Alike 4.0 (most text also dual-licensed under GFDL); Media licensing varies

The Sindhi Wikipedia (Sindhi: سنڌي وڪيپيڊيا, romanized: Sindhi Vicapedia) is a free encyclopedia, started 6 February 2006. It is the Sindhi language edition of Wikipedia, a free, open-content encyclopedia. It has 23,168 articles. Since 2014, the encyclopedia has experienced an overall increase in content.

== History ==
=== 2006 to 2008 ===
The Sindhi Wikipedia was started on 10 February 2006, by Professor Ahsan Ahmed Aursani.

=== 2009 to 2011 ===
During this time, Sindhi Wikipedia progressed slowly.

=== 2012 to 2014 ===
During this time, Sindhi Wikipedia also progressed slowly.

=== 2015 to 2017 ===
During this time, the Sindhi Wikipedia was expanded and some technical issues was resolved. Sindhi Wikipedia users improved content, references, technical issues, categorization, templates, and infoboxes. Sindhi Wikipedians arranged a Wikipedia awareness workshop in Karachi.

In 2017, JogiAsad and Muhammad Arif Soomro were interviewed in a KTN News program, which was the first televised interview covering the project and communities.

== Milestones ==
| Date | Milestone | Comment |
|---|---|---|
| 2015 | 1000 | |
| 2018 | 10,000 | |
| 2026 | 20,000 | |

== Users and editors ==
Sindhi Wikipedia statistics
| Number of user accounts | Number of articles | Number of files | Number of administrators |
|---|---|---|---|
| 22772 | 23168 | 159 | 4 |

== Collaborations ==
Sindhi Wikipedia community collaborated with Azerbaijani Wikipedia community for Wikipedia Asian Month 2019, 2020 and 2026 editions.

== See also ==
- Urdu Wikipedia
- Saraiki Wikipedia
- Encyclopedia Sindhiana
