= Mardan suicide bombing =

2015 terrorist incident

Mardan bombing
- Part of War in North-West Pakistan
- Location of Khyber Pakhtunkhwa in Pakistan
- Location: Mardan, Khyber Pakhtunkhwa, Pakistan
- Date: 29 December 2015
- Deaths: 26
- Injuries: 50

On 29 December 2015, a suicide bomber detonated his explosives in the front entrance of a regional branch of the National Database and Registration Authority, which is responsible for issuing ID cards in northwestern city of Mardan, Pakistan. The blast killed 26 people and more than 50 were wounded. Leader of Jamaat-ul-Ahrar, a faction of the Tehrik-i-Taliban Pakistan claimed responsibility for the attack.

== Bomber ==
Syed Abdullah, resident of Shahi Abad, Mohibanda in Mardan district, was found to be the bomber.

== See also ==
- 2013 Mardan funeral bombing
- List of terrorist incidents, 2015
- Terrorist incidents in Pakistan in 2015
