= Ghulam Ali Allana (academic) =

Pakistani writer, critic and linguist

- ڊاڪٽر غلام علي الانا
- Born: Ghulam Ali; 15 March 1930; Khuwaja, Taluka Jati, Sujawal District, Sindh
- Died: 28 November 2020 (aged 90); Hyderabad, Sindh, Pakistan
- Education: University of Sindh
- Occupations: writer, critic and linguist
- Writing career
- Period: 1971
- Genre: Linguist
- Subject: Linguistic
- Notable work: Poetry Books (65)
- Notable awards: Sitar-e-Imtiaz in 1993 by the Government of Pakistan

Ghulam Ali Allana (Sindhi: ڊاڪٽر غلام علي الانا; 15 March 1930 – 28 November 2020) was a writer, critic and linguist. He was Vice-chancellor of Allama Iqbal Open University Islamabad and chairman of the Sindhi Language Authority based in Hyderabad, Sindh.

== Professional career ==
He was appointed as a teacher at Training College for men, then, lecturer in Sindhi at City College Hyderabad. He was appointed as a lecturer at the University of Sindh in 1958. He was given additional charge as assistant director of Institute of Sindhology in 1963 and held the position until 1983. Besides, he was lecturer in Sindhi Department in University of Sindh from 1977. From 9 August 1983 to 18 April 1989 he was a Vice-chancellor of Allama Iqbal Open University Islamabad. He was Vice Chancellor of Sindh University in 1993. The Government of Sindh made him chairman of Sindhi Language Authority Hyderabad in 1998. He was on different high posts of educational and literary organizations of his country and abroad.

== Literary career ==
Allana started his literary career by writing Afsana (short stories). He also tried poetry using the pen name "Nashad". His first works, 'Chaur' [Thief] and 'Laash' [Corpse], were published in 1954. His last book, 'Origin of Sindhi Language,' was published in 2007. In 1952, he wrote a novel titled Lash.

== Publications ==
He published Sindhi Dictionary, Idea maker of Encyclopedia Sindhiana, a project of Sindhi Language Authority. He wrote more than 55 books and 200 Research papers other countless write-ups on Languages and Dialectics as well as on teaching methodologies. His written work has been published in various newspapers and magazines.

== Award ==
In recognition of his meritorious services in the field of Literature and Education, he was bestowed with Sitar-e-Imtiaz in 1993 by the Government of Pakistan. In 1983 Writer Guilds honored him with the award of excellence for his splendid services in the field of literature.

== Death ==
Ghulam Ali Allana died at the age of 91 on 28 November 2020. He was laid to rest in a graveyard near New Sabzi Mandi in Hyderabad on Sunday.
