= Daily Mehran =

Sindhi-language newspaper

- Type: Daily newspaper
- Format: Broadsheet
- Publisher: Mehran Publishers
- Founded: 1955
- Language: Sindhi
- Headquarters: Hyderabad, Pakistan
- Website: Official website Archived

Daily Mehran (Sindhi: روزانه مهراڻ) is a Sindhi-language daily newspaper in Sindh, Pakistan.

== History ==
It was founded in 1955. Its headquarter is located in Hyderabad, Sindh.

Over the years since its founding in 1955, many prominent scholars and journalists have served Daily Mehran newspaper and its sister publication Mehran magazine.

== Editors and publishers ==
The following people have been on the staff of Daily Mehran:

- Din Muhammad Wafai (Chairman, Board of Directors) (1955-1956)
- Hassam-ud-Din Rashidi (1958)
- Ghulam Mohammad Grami (1959 - 1976)
- Muhammad Usman Diplai (1976-1979) and (1992-1993)
- Tariq Alam Abro (1993-2011)
- Shamsher-ul-Hyderi (2011-2012)

== See also ==
- List of newspapers in Pakistan
