= Mumtaz Mirza =

Writer (1927–1997)

Mumtaz Mirza Sindhi: ممتاز مرزا
- Born: Mirza Tawasul Hussain; 29 November 1927; Hyderabad, Sindh, British India
- Died: 6 January 1997 (aged 69); Hyderabad, Sindh
- Education: Master of Arts degree in Sindhi language
- Occupations: Broadcaster, writer
- Relatives: Mirza Gul Hassan Ahsan Karbalai (father)
- Writing career
- Pen name: "ممتاز مرزا" (Mumtaz Mirza)
- Notable work: Sindhi poetry
- Notable awards: Pride of Performance Award by the Government of Pakistan in 1998

Mumtaz Mirza (original name Tawasul Hussain) (Sindhi: ممتاز مرزا) (29 November 1927 – 6 January 1997) was an expert in Sindhi literature, culture, music, and a broadcaster of Pakistan Broadcasting Corporation, Pakistan Television Corporation and stage. He died on 6 January 1997.

== Early life ==
He was born at Tando Agha, Hyderabad, Pakistan. His father Mirza Gul Hassan Ahsan Karbalai was also a good poet from the family of Mirza Kalich Beg, a well-known figure of Sindhi literature. Mumtaz Mirza made the most of the literary environment he lived in. He started writing poetry at the age of seventeen.

== Education ==
Mumtaz Mirza had done Bachelor of Arts and Master of Arts in the Sindhi language.

== Professional career ==
Mumtaz Mirza worked as a Research Assistant in compiling the Sindhi Language Dictionary scheme and some other projects of literature and culture with Dr. Nabi Bux Khan Baloch. Subsequently, he served as a scriptwriter at Pakistan Broadcasting Corporation, Hyderabad, Sindh, as an Information Officer at the University of Sindh, as a TV program producer and script editor at Pakistan Television Corporation, and as chairman of the Sindhi Language Authority respectively. Finally, he held the position of Director-General in the culture department of Sindh until his death.

== Literary career ==
He introduced new programs during his service at Pakistan Broadcasting Corporation, Pakistan Television Corporation, Karachi center. In a TV program "Parkho", he proved his talents. He hosted many folk and literary TV programs. All the government TV programs were held under his supervision. He started hosting TV programs on the advice of Dr. Nabi Bux Khan Baloch in the "All Sindh Comedy Conference" at Basant Hall Hyderabad, Sindh held on 4 October 1961. For thirty-five years of his life, he was involved in staging programs of music and culture. During his broadcasting career, he introduced many Sindhi artists including the famous sindhi folk singer Allan Fakir.

== Publications ==
He had written both in English and Urdu languages. His writings included some TV dramas, research papers, stories and some books. He had written the book "Sindh Sadiyun Kaan" (1982). His other book “Supriyan Sandee Gaalhiree’ presents the life of singer Mohammad Yousaf in the background of Hyderabad city. Another book “Sada Soneta Karpi” discusses the great singer Allan Fakir.

== Awards and recognition ==
- In recognition of his services, Department of Culture & Tourism, Government of Sindh had named the famous Mumtaz Mirza Auditorium in Hyderabad after him.
- Government of Pakistan had announced the Pride of Performance Award for him on 14 August 1997, after his death, which was actually given on 23 March 1998.

== Death ==
Mumaz Mirza died on 6 January 1997 at Hyderabad, Sindh.
