= Kamal Jamro =

Writer, researcher and poet of Sindhi and Urdu (1972–2020)

Dr. Kamal Jamro
- Born: 1 August 1972; Ranipur
- Died: 16 December 2020 (aged 48); Karachi, Pakistan
- Occupations: Professor, Writer and Academic and Researcher
- Children: 4

Kamal Jamro (August 1, 1972 - December 16, 2020) was a professor, writer, educationist, researcher and poet. He had written various books on Sindhi literature.

== Early life and education ==
Dr. Kamal Jamro was born on August 1, 1972, in Khairpur district, near Ranipur in village Gul Mohammad Jamro. He received his primary education in his native village, while he got his Intermediate education in Ranipur, Sindh. Later, he moved to Karachi to pursue a career as a radio compere. He pursued a B.A honors and M.A in Sindhi from Karachi University. He had a PhD in folk literature from the University of Karachi. This PhD dissertation was published in a booklet by the Department of Culture, government of Sindh in 2010.

== Career ==
Dr. Kamal Jamro became a Research Officer in the Shah Latif Chair of the University of Karachi in May 1998. In August 2000, he became the lecturer of Sindhi in Islamia Science College Karachi. He was the chairperson of Sindhi department at the Federal Urdu University of Arts, Science and Technology, Karachi.

He was also the editor of the monthly magazine 'Maha Roz' Karachi and the chief editor of Islamia College Magazine 2003. He worked as a composer and announcer on Radio Pakistan Karachi and also supervised Sindhi learning classes conducted by the Sindhi Language Authority in Karachi.

He published research papers, articles and poetry in various Sindhi language newspapers and magazines. He used to write in Sindhi and Urdu for radio and television drama. His article 'Shah Abdul Latif and Sufi Poets of Pakistani Languages', written alongside Tariq Aziz Shaikh, is published by Shah Latif Chair, University of Karachi. One of his books about Sindhi folk artists 'The Immortal Voice of Sindhi Culture', published by the culture department, government of Sindh.

== Awards ==
Dr. Jamro was awarded many accolades for his contribution to the progress of Sindhi folklore and the Heritage of Sindh. The Government of Sindh also nominated Dr. Jamro for the Pride of Performance award to the government of Pakistan. He was awarded with Sufi award by Sufi foundation for his research work and writings.

== Death ==
Kamal Jamro died in Karachi on December 16, 2020, at age of 48 due to dengue fever.
