= Anwar Pirzada =

Pakistani journalist and historian (1945–2007)

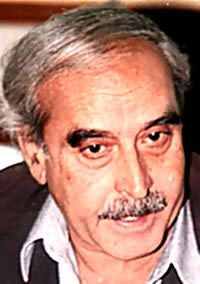
- Anwar Pirzada in 2007
- Born: Muhammad Paryal Pirzada; January 25, 1945; Larkana, Sindh, Pakistan
- Died: January 7, 2007 (aged 61); Karachi, Sindh, Pakistan
- Occupations: Journalist; Poet

Anwar Pirzada (Sindhi: انور پيرزادو; 25 January 1945–7 January 2007) was a journalist, columnist, writer and expert on Sindhi history, language and Shah Abdul Latif Bhittai's poetry.

== Early life and education ==
Anwer Pirzado was born on 25 January 1939 at village Haji Lal Bux Shaikh, near Mohen Jo Daro, district Larkana. His birth name was Muhammad Paryal s/o Shafi Muhammad Pirzada. He received early education in the primary school of his village and passed matriculation from Government High School Dokri. He earned a degree of Master of Arts in English literature in 1969 from University of Sindh, Jamshoro.

== Career ==
He began his career as a primary school teacher in 1963 and served in various schools till 1968. He also continued his education. In 1969, he was appointed as a lecturer in English department of Sindh University. In 1970 he was selected as pilot officer in Pakistan Airforce. He completed his six months training, however, he was arrested and jailed because of his opposition to operation in East Pakistan (now Bangladesh).

He was released from jail after seven months and joined daily Hilal-e-Pakistan as a sub editor. In 1975, he was appointed as an editor of the English Buletin published by the Russian Embassy of Pakistan. This Buletin ceased publication in 1980. He then joined English daily Dawn as its representative of Larkana and daily The Star as a Bureau Chief. He was jailed for six months for writing number of columns against the Marshal law Government in Pakistan during the Movement of Restoration of Democracy (M.R.D.). He was also associated with many other dailies including Awami Awaz, Jaago, Sindh Sujag, Barsaat, Sindh Tribune and Sach.

== Books ==
Anwer Pirzada was an author, poet, translator and research scholar. He translated and authored many books including the following. Most of his books were published by the Anwer Pirzado Academy after his death.

- Aye Chand Bhitaia Khay Chaijan, published in 2005. (Sindhi: ائي چنڊ ڀٽائيءَ کي چئجانءِ)
- Matan Wisario (Sindhi: متان وساريو), Essays and articles published in 2007.
- Bhitai (Sindhi: ڀٽائي), On the poetry of Shah Abdul Latif Bhitai (2007).
- Mambai Yatra (Sindhi: ممبئي ياترا), Travelogue, published in 2008.
- Sindhi Language and Literature- A brief account (2009)
- Jadded Sindhi Adab (Sindhi: جديد سنڌي ادب), A brief history of Sindhi literature published in 2010.
- Interview and Taqreeroon (Sindhi: انٽرويو ۽ تقريرون), Interviews and speeches published in 2011.
- Sindh (Sindhi: سنڌ), columns and essays published in 2011.
- Bhun Jhun (Sindhi: ڀڻ جھڻ), Columns and articles published in 2012.
- Ishiq (Sindhi: عشق). Poetry published in 2013.
- Indus and its Delta (2013)
- Fana (Sindhi: فنا). Poetry, published in 2018.
- Anwer Pirzaday Joon Kahaniyoon (Sindhi: انور پيرزادي جون ڪھاڻيون), Short stories published in 2019.

== Death ==
Anwer Pirzado died on 07 January 2007 in Karachi. He had three sons and one daughter.
