= Darbadar =

Pakistani poet (1944–2022)

Juman Darbadar
- Mama Juman Darbadar
- Born: 12 May 1944
- Died: 20 October 2022 (aged 78)
- Resting place: Rahul Via village, Umerkot, Sindh
- Citizenship: Pakistani
- Occupations: poet, writer, and political activist
- Writing career
- Language: sindhi
- Notable work: Wathi Har Har Janam Warbo
- Literary movement: Revolutionary

Juman Darbadar Sand or Mama Juman Darbadar (12 May 1944 – 20 October 2022) (Sindhi: جمن دربدر) Urdu (جمن دربدر), popularly known by his pen name Darbadar (meaning "wanderer") was a poet, writer and political activist. Darbadar was considered to be one of the greatest poets of the Sindhi language.

== Career ==
He started as a political activist in political movements with the Sindhi nationalist G. M. Syed and others, fighting for the rights of poor people and opposed martial law in 1980s. He wrote revolutionary poetry from which Wathi Har Har Janam Warbo is the most popular.

== Death ==
Due to cardiac arrest, he died on 20 October 2022. Many of the politicians and poets passed condolences on his demise. He was buried in Ruhal Vai village Umerkot.
