= Mir Abdul Hussain Sangi =

19th-century Sindhi poet

- مير عبدالحسين سانگي

Personal life
- Born: Mir Abdul Hussain Khan Sangi; 1851 CE Kolkata, British Empire (now West Bengal, India)
- Died: 1924 CE (aged 73) Bhit Shah, British Empire (now Sindh, Pakistan)
- Parent: Mir Abbas Ali Khan Talpur (father)
- Main interest(s): Sindhi Urdu Persian, poetry
- Notable works: Sooz Sangi (Kafiyoon); Lataif Latifi (life biography of Shah Abdul Latif in Persian); Dewan Sangi (3 volumes); Khani Mohobat Hani ڪھاڻي محبت ھاڻي; Qasas Rahat Afza قصص راحت افزا; Akhani Raat Vehani ڪھاڻي رات وھاڻي; Qesa Dilchasp قصا دلچسپ; Dastan Ferhat Afzan داستان فرحت افزان

Religious life
- Religion: Islam
- Movement: Independent movement

Mir Abdul Hussain Sangi Talpur (Sindhi: مير عبدالحسين سانگي ٽالپر), was a Sindhi language poet, prose and novel writer during the British Empire. He was born in Kolkata. His father Mir Abbas Ali Talpur was held in jail; his father married an English lady; Mir Abdul was born from this union in 1851. In childhood he stayed there but when young Mir Abdul was six years old his father died in Calcatta, and he started living with his paternal uncle Mir Hussan Ali Khan Talpur; in 1863 he arrived in Sindh with his uncle.
