= Sabit Ali Shah =

18th-century Sufi writer

Syed Sabit Ali Shah

سيد ثابت علي شاھ
- Born: 19 November 1740; Sehwan, Sindh, Kalhora Dynasty
- Died: 1 January 1810 (aged 69); Sehwan, Sindh
- Venerated in: Sindhi Shia Islam
- Influences: Akhund Abdul Rehman (first teacher); Akhund Elyas (Persian & Arabic teacher); Shah Abdul Latif Bhittai (poet)
- Tradition or genre: Poetry (Sindhi, Persian)

Syed Sabit Ali Shah (1740–1810) was a Sindhi poet born in Sehwan, Sindh in the Kalhora Dynasty.

== Family and education ==
His father Syed Madar Ali Shah had three sons including Syed Sabit Ali Shah. Syed Sabit Ali Shah received early education from his teacher Akhund Abdul Rehman. When his teacher went on Hajj, he started learning Quranic teaching from Mule Chaker and Persian from Akhund Elyas. His first teacher in poetry was Makhdom Noor ul Haq Mushtaqi, and finally with Mian Sarfraz Khan Kalhoro he became the pupil of Ghulam Ali Madah.

He was The Court Poet under Mian Sarfraz Khan Kalhoro and Mir Karam Ali Talpur

== Poetry ==
In the final years of Kalhora Dynasty, and early Talpur Dynasty great changes occurred in Sindhi Poetry. He was the first ever poet of Sindh who properly laid down the Elegy in Sindhi language and he was the first to write epic poetry. His first student in elegy was Mirza Murad Ali Baigh.

== Death ==
Syed Sabit Ali Shah died in 1810 (1225 Hijri), and he was entombed in Sehwan, Sindh, where the great shrine was built on his grave.
