= The Second Floor =

Community space in Karachi

T2F (The Second Floor)
- Interactive map of T2F (The Second Floor)

Restaurant information
- Established: 2007
- Owner: Peace Niche
- Food type: Coffeehouse and café fare
- Dress code: Casual
- Location: 10-C, Sunset Lane 5, Phase 2 Extension, DHA, Karachi, Sindh, 75500, Pakistan
- Coordinates: 24°49′54″N 67°03′55″E
- Website: t2f.com.pk

T2F, also known as The Second Floor, is a community space and the first project of the non-profit organization Peace Niche founded by Sabeen Mahmud. It is a café based in Karachi (Pakistan) and a vibrant center of the city's society. The place is designed to enable discussion on human rights, peace-building, justice, environment, social development and intellectual poverty alleviation.

Founded in 2007 the café was designed in the coffeehouse tradition. It consists of an art gallery, a bookshop, a coffeehouse and a conversation space. Exhibitions, conferences, talks, music concerts and festivals take place at T2F.

== Awards ==
- 2016 Prince Claus Award
