= Sindhi Adabi Sangat =

Pakistani

Sindhi Adabi Sangat (Sindhi: سنڌي ادبي سنگت), Sindhi literary fraternity, is an organisation dedicated to Sindhi language writers, with branches in Sindh, Pakistan and internationally.

There are different vies on it origin: some suggest that the organisation was initially formed before Pakistan's independence in 1947, while others believe it was established after the Partition of India.
