= 2015 Jacobabad bombing =

Terrorist attack in Pakistan

- Location: 28°16′37″N 68°27′05″E; Lashari Mohalla, Jacobabad, Sindh, Pakistan
- Date: 23 October 2015
- Target: Shia Muslims
- Attack type: Suicide attack
- Weapon: Explosive belt
- Deaths: at least 22; 20-25 missing
- Injuries: 20+
- Perpetrator: Lashkar-e-Jhangvi (LeJ)

On 23 October 2015, twenty-three people were killed when a suicide bomber targeted a procession of Shia Muslims marking Ashoura in Jacobabad, Sindh. At least five children are among the dead. The bombing also injured at least 32 people.

== See also ==
- Targeted killings in Pakistan
- Terrorist incidents in Pakistan in 2015
