= Fahmida Hussain =

Author, scholar, linguist and intellectual of Pakistan (born 1978)

Fahmida Hussain Memon
- ڊاڪٽر فهميده حسين ميمڻ
- Born: July 5, 1948 (age 78); Hyderabad, Sindh
- Education: Ph.D.
- Alma mater: Dr. of Philosophy (Sindhi Literature); Diploma in Hindi Language; L.L.B; MA English; MA Sindhi,
- Known for: Linguist, Educationalist, Teacher
- Spouse: Abdul Hussain
- Children: 3
- Parent: Mohammad Yakoon "Niaz" (Father)
- Awards: • President's Pride of Performance (2005) • Pakistan Academy of Letters Award (2004) • Latif Award for Outstanding work in Research & Publications (2003) • Sahyog Foundation Award for best Sindhi Writer of Sindh (2000) • Sindh Graduates Association Award in Research & Writing (1995) • Hijra Award 1414, Pakistan Academy of Letters (1994) • Sindhi Adabi Sangat Award for Best Research on Shah Latif's Poetry & Women Studies (1994)

Fahmida Hussain (maiden name Fahmida Memon) (Sindhi: ڊاڪٽر فهميده حسين ميمڻ) is a Sindhi author, scholar, linguist and intellectual from Sindh, Pakistan.

== Early life ==
Fahmida Hussain was born on July 5, 1948, in Tando Jam in district Hyderabad Sindh, Pakistan. Her father Mohammad Yakoon "Niaz" was also a scholar who had translated poetry of Hafiz Shirazi from Persian to Sindhi language. Her brother Sirajul Haq Memon was also a well-known author and researcher. Her fields of work have been: Literature, Linguistics, Woman studies and Anthropology. Her specialization is in the study of the great classical mystic poet Shah Abdul Latif Bhittai. Dr Fahmida was the Chairperson of Sindhi Language Authority from May 2008 to March 2015.

Before that she had served as Director of Shah Abdul Latif Chair, University of Karachi for ten years. Prior to that she had also served as Professor and Chairperson of the Department of Sindhi in the same university. Dr Fahmida Hussain has more than 15 books to her credit along with several research articles on the subjects of Literary Criticism, Linguistics with special reference to different aspects of Sindhi language, poetry of Shah Abdul Latif Bhittai and gender issues.

She started writing short stories and poetry from a very young age and has to her credit one book of short stories as well. She has been writing columns, articles and critiques in various newspapers and magazines from the last 40 years. She is married to Abdul Hussain and they have 3 children.

== Education ==
Fahmida Hussain did her early schooling from Model School in Hyderabad, Sindh, and completed her graduation in 1968 from D. J. Science College in Karachi. She pursued master's degree in English in 1970 from the Department of English at University of Sindh in Hyderabad, and another Masters in Sindhi in 1972 from the same university.

In 1990 she completed a Diploma course in Hindi language from the Department of General History at the University of Karachi. Further on, in 1992, she successfully completed her doctors thesis in Sindhi literature to obtain a Ph.D.

Fahmida Hussain also obtained a Bachelor of Law degree (LLB) in 1981.

== Career ==
In 1972, Hussain was appointed Lecturer of English at the Institute of Education at the University of Sindh, a post she held until 1975. From 1978 to 1988 she taught as lecturer of Sindhi at the University of Karachi. In 1988 she was appointed as assistant professor, a post she held until 1995 when she was appointed a full Professor, and later also chairperson of the department in 1997.

In the year 1998, Fahmida Hussain accepted the position of Director, Shah Abdul Latif Bhittai Chair at the University of Karachi. In May 2008, Dr Hussain was appointed to the coveted and prestigious post of chairperson, Sindhi Language Authority.

During all these years starting from 1968 to date, Fahmida Hussain has been writing in Sindhi, Urdu and English on various fronts: as a columnist, editor, researcher, translator, author and linguist. Dr Hussain serves as a member on the boards of a number of important educational institutions in the country.

Currently she retired from the post of chairperson of Sindhi language Authority (SLA), Sindh.

She has also received a number of awards and recognition for her work and contribution.

== Books published ==
She has written several books on literature, Language engineering and on Shah Abdul Latif Bhittai's poetry. Here is a list of books on credit of her: (2012) Sindhu Likhat-21st Sadi-a Men Thial Tahqique(Translation of research articles on Indus Script), Sindhi Language Authority Hyderabad
(2012) Adyoon Aaoon Anjaan, (Articles on the poetry of Shah Latif)- Culture Department, Govt. of Sindh, Karachi
(2012) Sindhi Boli-Lisani Pahloo (Essays on Sindhi Language), Sindhi Language Authority, Hyderabad, Sindh
(2011) Sindhi Boli-a ji Sikhya (Devnagari), Sindhi Language Authority, Hyderabad, Sindh
(2011) Aaiye Sindhi Seekhen (Let Us Learn Sindhi with CD)- Sindhi Language Authority, Hyderabad, Sindh
(2008) Shah Abdul Latif Bhitai-(Life, Poetry & Philosophy in Urdu), Pakistan Academy of Letters, Islamabad.
(2006) Duniya Joon Shair Aurtoon ( Sindhi translation of Poetry of Women Poets of the World)- Sindhi Adabi Board, Jamshoro.
(2003) Hik Hawa Kaen Kahanyoon (Collection of short stories), Sachal Academy, Karachi.
(2002) Image of Woman in the Poetry of Shah Latif, (English Translation) Shah Abdul Latif Bhitai Chair, University of Karachi, Karachi
(2002) Adabi Tanqeed-Fan ain Tareekh (Literary Criticism-Art and History), Naoon Nyapo Academy, Karachi.
(2000) Bar-e-Sagheer Ji Bolian Jo Lisanianti Jaizo (Sindhi translation of Linguistic Survey of India, Volume VIII, Part 1, by George Grierson), Sindhi Language Authority, Hyderabad.
(1996) Shah Latif ki Shairi Mein Aurat ka Roop (Urdu translation ) Bhit Shah Cultural Committee, Hyderabad.
(1993) Shah Latif Ji Shairi Mein Aurat Jo Roop (Image of Woman in the Poetry of Shah Latif), Bhit Shah Cultural Committee, Hyderabad.
(1990) Pir Hisamuddin Rashidi- A Biography, Sindh Culture & Tourism Department, Karachi. (1983) Hawaun Je Adhar- Travelogue, Agam Publishers, Hyderabad.

== Awards ==
- 2005: Pride of Performance award by the President of Pakistan in 2005.
- 2004: Pakistan Academy of Letters Award
- 2003: Latif Award for Outstanding work in Research & Publications
- 2000: Sahyog Foundation Award for best Sindhi Writer of Sindh
- 1995: Sindh Graduates Association Award in Research & Writing
- 1994: (Hijra Award 1414), Shah Abdul Latif Bhitai award by Pakistan Academy of Letters for a 'Best Book' in Sindhi language.
- 1994: Sindhi Adabi Sangat Award for Best Research on Shah Latif's Poetry & Women Studies
