= Ghulam Mohammad Grami =

Pakistani scholar, journalist and poet (1920-1976)

Ghulam Mohammad Grami Sindhi: مولانا غلام محمد گرامي
- Born: Ghulam Mohammad; 30 December 1920; Mehar, Dadu District, Sindh, Pakistan
- Died: 15 September 1976 (aged 55); Hyderabad, Sindh, Pakistan
- Occupations: Poet, journalist, researcher, literary critic

Ghulam Mohammad Grami (Sindhi: مولانا غلام محمد گرامي) (30 December 1920 – 15 September 1976) was a scholar, journalist and poet from Pakistan. He belonged to the Laghari Baloch tribe of Sindh.

== Early life and career ==
He received his basic education and learned Sindhi, Persian, Urdu and Arabic languages at religious schools. In 1943, he traveled to Hyderabad, Sindh and worked as a teacher at Jamia Arabia School there and stayed for a few years in Hyderabad. Then he was a Persian language teacher at the Training College for Men in Hyderabad from 1951 to 1954. Later, due to disagreements between the teachers and the religious groups, he quit this teaching job and went into the profession of newspaper journalism.

He was affiliated with daily Hilal-e-Pakistan and Ibrat newspapers. He also held the post of editor of Aftab Karachi, a Sindhi-language newspaper, Irfan-e-Latif (Hyderabad), Pasban (Hala), Alzaman (Hala), and Tarjuman (Mirpur Khas). In 1955, Sindhi Adabi Board, a literary institute sponsored by the Government of Sindh appointed him the Managing Editor of Daily Mehran newspaper and Mehran magazine and he held these positions for the rest of his life until his death in 1976. He published the poetry and writings of new writers in the magazine and the newspaper. He also collected literature for Mehran from different sources. Grami also was an active member of Pakistan Writers Guild. He used to sit in Cafe George in Hyderabad and would edit the articles and write-ups of literary figures.

Grami was an admirer and devotee of the Sindhi Sufis, Shah Abdul Latif Bhittai and Sachal Sarmast, and was influenced by their teachings. Another personality that he was impressed with and influenced by was Maulana Ubaidullah Sindhi (1872- 1944).

== Publications ==
Grami wrote books on different subjects:

- Allah Jo Wajud (1953) (Sindhi: الله جو وجود)
- Waya se Weenjhar (1977) (Sindhi: ويا سي وينجھار)
- ( Rafeeq-e-Hayat (1957) (Sindhi: رفيق هدايت)
- Kuliyat-e-Bulbul (1969) (Sindhi: ڪليات بلبل)
- Asan jo Piyaro Deen(1971) (Sindhi: اسان جو پيارو دين) Deeniyat for class VIII

Mohammad Shah Rashdi said about him: “The language that has such pen, shall never die”. He wrote on religion, mysticism, philosophy, politics, literature, history and poetry.

== Death and legacy ==
Ghulam Mohammad Grami died on 15 September 1976 at Hyderabad, Sindh, Pakistan. He was buried in the courtyard of the Tomb of Mian Ghulam Kalhoro near the tomb of Hyder Bux Jatoi in Hyderabad, Sindh, Pakistan.

To commemorate Grami's love for Sindhi literature, many books were written on his life. In 1980, Ghulam Mohammad Grami Academy and a library in his name were established.
