= Sabeen Mahmud =

Pakistani human rights activist (1974–2015)

- صبین محمود
- Born: 20 June 1974; Karachi, Pakistan
- Died: 24 April 2015 (aged 40); Karachi, Pakistan
- Cause of death: Assassination (gunshot wounds)
- Occupations: Human rights activist, social activist, NGO worker

Sabeen Mahmud (20 June 1974 – 24 April 2015) (Urdu: صبین محمود) was a progressive Pakistani human rights activist and social worker who founded the Karachi-based cafe The Second Floor. She also presided over the Karachi branch of TiE.

Born and raised in Karachi, Mahmud was educated at Karachi Grammar and later at the Kinnaird College. She later founded an interactive media and technology consulting firm and worked to establish the Citizens Archive of Pakistan. She set up The Second Floor (T2F) in 2007 aimed at providing a community space for open dialogue. Under Mahmud's leadership, T2F arranged a series of liberal social activities. She also co-led protests against the Red Mosque in Islamabad, and also took part in Pakistan for All, a campaign to end sectarianism and religious intolerance in Pakistan.

On 24 April 2015, Mahmud hosted a debate on the Balochistan conflict featuring activists such as Mama Qadeer. Later that day, she was shot and killed by a gunman while returning home from the seminar at T2F. By 20 May 2015, Pakistani authorities had arrested the individual responsible for her murder. Mahmud is widely regarded as a prominent figure within 'Pakistan's liberal, urban, and globalised civil society'.

== Life ==
Mahmud wanted to challenge injustice and discrimination, and to encourage critical thinking; she told Dawn that her biggest dream is to "change the world for the better through the Internet." She founded PeaceNiche, an organisation that provides a "social platform" for public good.

Mahmud founded a small tech company called "bits" with Zaheer Kidvai, with whom she worked in 2 other companies from the age of 14, and considered him her parent and mentor. In 2006, she founded The Second Floor (T2F), a cafe that hosted public forum discussions, film screenings, poetry writing, stand-up comedy, and live theatre. In 2013, Sabeen co-hosted Pakistan's first civic hackathon, held at T2F in Karachi, which was designed to bring together people from different disciplines to brainstorm ways to solve civic problems. Mahmud hosted public figures, including Ayesha Siddiqa who authored a controversial book on military financing, leading to the Inter-Services Intelligence contacting The Second Floor. Mahmud was a Young Global Leader of the World Economic Forum.

In 2013, she told Wired magazine that she didn't want an armed security guard in The Second Floor: "I said, that’s the price you pay for having a public space. I’m not having people checked and a military guy there because of a pervasive fear." She went on to state "Read Chomsky. Things are dangerous and bad things happen. But you can’t let fear control you, you’ll never get anything done." Her work received coverage in international media.

== Death ==
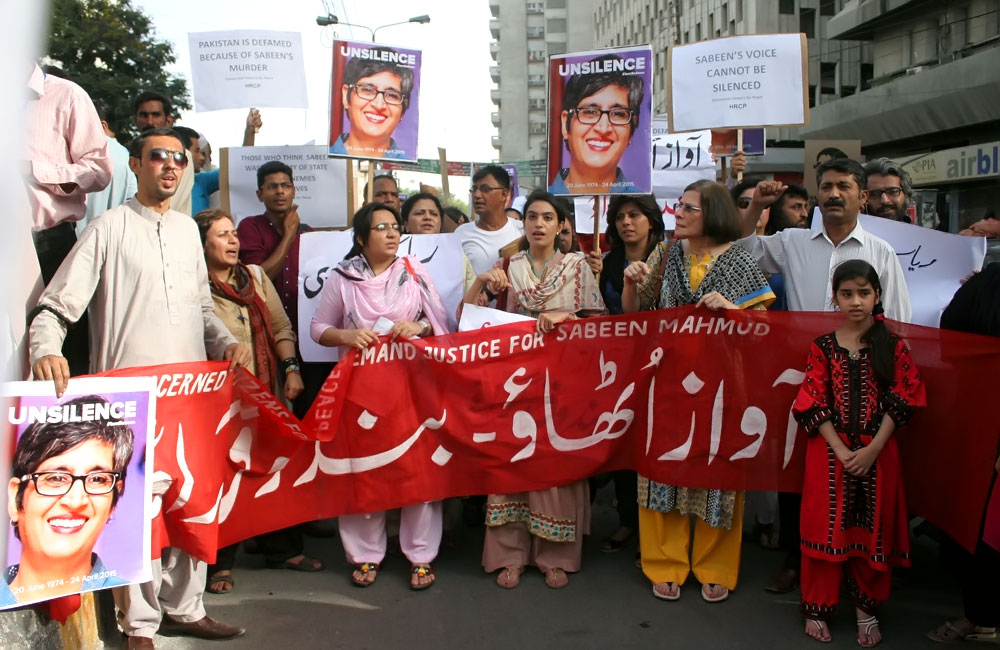
Protest after the murder.

During the late hours of 24 April 2015, Mahmud was fatally shot by gunmen on her way home after hosting a seminar. The gunmen (later identified as Saad Aziz and Aliur Rehman) shot her four or five times with a 9mm gun, as her car waited at a traffic light less than 500 metres from T2F.

According to a police official, the murder was a direct target killing and was booked by the police under the Terrorism Act. Her mother Mahenaz Mahmud was also critically wounded in the attack and taken to the Aga Khan Hospital for treatment by Nuzhat Kidvai. The seminar, titled 'Unsilencing Balochistan (Take 2)', was held at the T2F cafe and focused on Balochistan. Among the guest speakers was the Baloch activist Mama Qadeer.

According to Mama Qadeer, Mahmud and her mother left shortly after the event ended. The event had been rescheduled from 21 April to 24 April, and at a different venue, as organisers had received threats earlier. The Chief Minister of Sindh Qaim Ali Shah condemned the killing and called an inquiry into the incident. Prime Minister Nawaz Sharif extended his condolences to the family and sought a report from investigating authorities. The activist's death was also met with shock by prominent media and civil society members on social media. Nasreen Jalil, Mosharraf Zaidi, Altaf Hussain, Fasi Zaka, Raza Rumi, Hamid Mir, Arif Alvi, Fatima Bhutto, Taimur Rahman, Kamila Shamsie, Malala Yousafzai and Sharmila Farooqi, among others, poured condemnations over the incident. General Asim Bajwa, director general of the Inter-Services Public Relations, strongly condemned the killing and assured that intelligence agencies would provide assistance in capturing the perpetrators. A panel in memory of Mahmud was held at the 2015 Islamabad Literature Festival. On 23 May 2015 an international Hackathon was organized in memory of Mahmud.

On 20 May, Chief Minister of Sindh Qaim Ali Shah stated that the mastermind behind Mahmud's murder had been arrested. The culprit also confessed his involvement in the bus shooting against Ismailis in Karachi. The accused was identified as Saad Aziz.

== See also ==
- Human rights in Pakistan
- Targeted killings in Pakistan
