= Ayaz Gul =

Sindhi poet (born 1959)

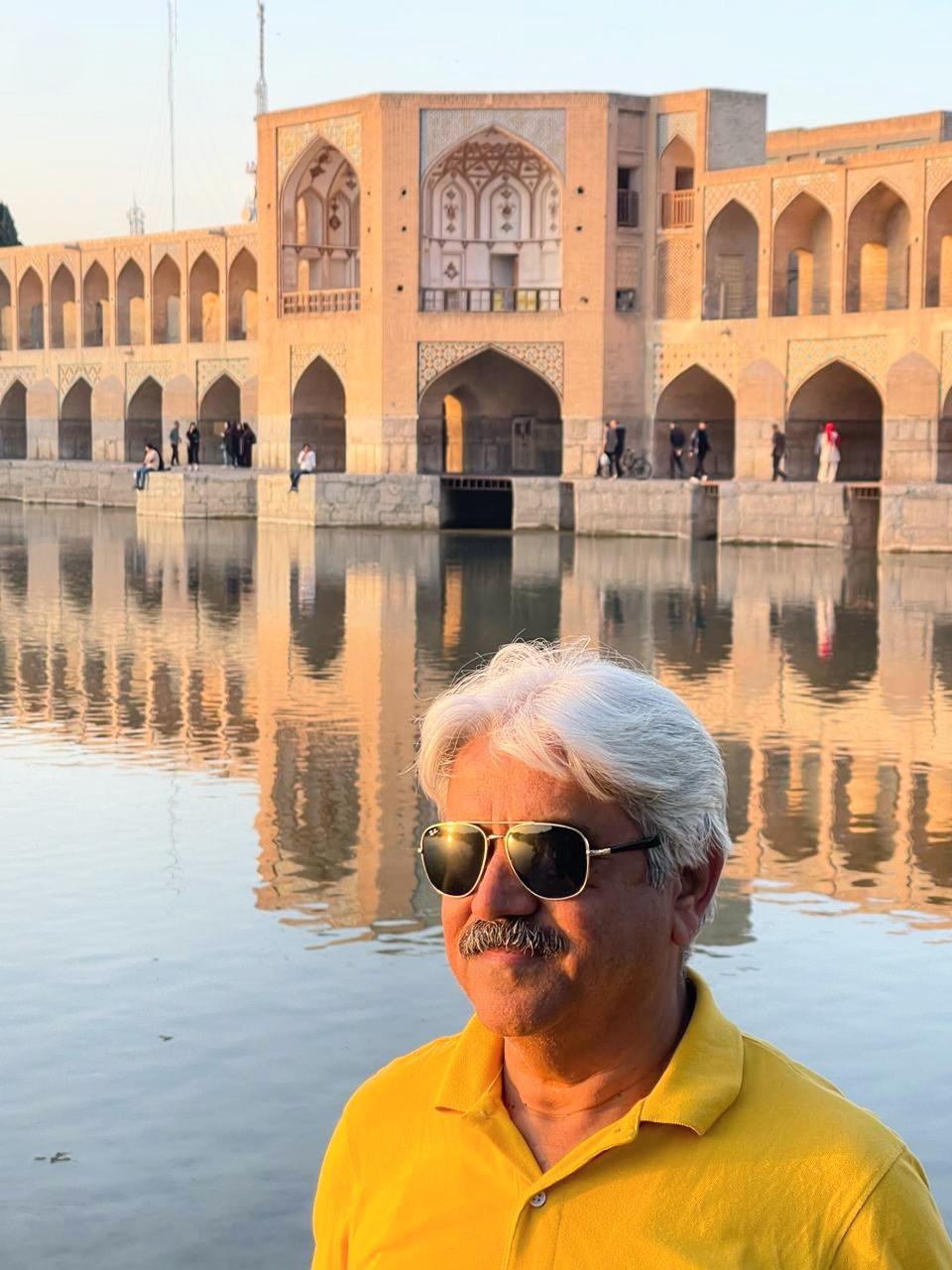
- Born: 6 March 1959 (age 67); Sukkur, Sindh, Pakistan
- Education: Sindh University, Jamshoro, Sindh, Pakistan
- Occupation: Poet, Professor
- Employer(s): Shah Abdul Latif University, Khairpur, Sindh, Pakistan
- Spouse: Dr. Mastoor Bukhari
- Children: Namwar Ayaz
- Father: Rajib Ali Dal
- Awards: Pride of Performance award by the President of Pakistan in 2022

Ayaz Gul (Sindhi: ایاز گُل; born 6 March 1959) is a contemporary poet from Sindh, Pakistan.

His works are in the Sindhi language of Pakistan.

== Early life ==
Ayaz Gul was born Ayaz Ali Da to Rajib Ali Dal on 6 March 1959 in Sukkur city of Sukkur District, Sindh, Pakistan. He obtained an MA in Sindhi literature from (Government Islamia Arts & Commerce College Sukkur, Sindh) University of Sindh, Jam Shoro, Sindh, Pakistan.

== Career ==
Ayaz Gul has authored 12 books of Sindhi poetry. The published books of his poetry, 'Sochoon Suraha Gul'1978, 'GUL Ain Tara'1979,'Peela Gul'a Paland Mein' 1980 'Deenhn Dithey Ja Sapna' 1984,'To Bin Kehra Chanwra' published in 1992 followed by' 'Dukh Ji Na Pujani Aa' in 1997 and 'Mele Ji Tanhae' 2012.

He was a professor of the Sindhi language and literature, a Chairman of the Sindhi Department, as well as the director of the Sachal Sarmast chair at the Shah Abdul Latif University, Khairpur.

Ayaz Gul is a popular poet of the modern Ghazal poetry style.

A street in Sukkur city in Pakistan was named in his honor.

== Books ==
- Sochoon Suraha Gul (Poetry) 1978
- Gul Ain Tara in Sindhi :(Poems for Children) 1979
- Peela Gul Paland Mein (Ghazals) 1980
- Deehan Dithey Ja Sapna (Poetry) 1984
- To Bin Kehra Chanwra (Poetry Collection) 1992
- Dukkh Jee Na Pujani Aa (Poetry Collection) 1997
- Mele Gee Tanhaee ( Poetry collection) 2012
- Pahinjo Hee School (Poem for Children) 2017
- Raand Roond (Poem for Children) 2017
- Khalkanhaar (Poem for Children) 2017
- The Exiled Memories ( Translation from Sindhi by Latif Noonari) 2021
- Nind’a Pari ( Collection of poems for children) 2021
- Mysticisms, Sindh and Sachal Sarmast ( Research Articles Compilation) 2011
- Sukkur joon yadgiryoon (Collected & Edited) 2001
- Pawan Shal Qabool (Collection of essays and articles-Edited) 2005
- Roshan Aa Sanjhi (Selection Of verses by Tanveer Abbasi -Compilation) 2008
- Zang Lagal Zindagi (Stories / Prose Collection) under print.
- Rangan Wari Duniya Sari (Collection for Children) under print.

== Awards and recognition ==
He has been granted many awards, including the best poet, the Writers Guild Award, an award from the Pakistan Academy of Letters, and an award from the Sindhi Language Authority in Hyderabad, Pakistan.

- Pride of Performance Award by the President of Pakistan, (award announced on 14 August 2021, actually conferred on 23 March 2022 - Pakistan Day) in 2022.
- Hijra Award (Shah Latif Award), Pakistan Academy of Letters, Islamabad: Awarded for the (Best book of the year) “Dukkh Jee Na Pujani Aa” - 1997.
- Shah Abdul Latif Bhittai National Award, Pakistan Academy of Letters, Islamabad: Awarded for (Best book of the year) “Mele Jee Tanhae”- 2012.
- Sindhi Language Authority Award, Sindhi Language Authority, Hyderabad: Awarded for (Best poetry book of the year) “Dukkh Jee Na Pujani Aa”-1997.
- Institute of Sindhology Award, Institute of Sindhology, Jamshoro, Sindh: Awarded for the (Best poetry book of the year) “Sochoon Suraha Gul” 1978.
- Sindh Adeeb Award – 2010 Akhil Bharat Sindhi Boli Ain Sahit Sabha, India. Awarded for the (Best Writer of the year) – 2010
- Sindhu Ratan Award – 2011 Federation of Sindhi Panchayats, Delhi India: Awarded for the outstanding performance in the field of Literature, May 2011
- A. Wahid Jumani, Sindh Graduates Association: Awarded for the (Best poetry book of the year) “Deehan Dithey Ja Sapna”-1984.
- PTV Award - Pakistan Television, Karachi Centre: Awarded for the (Best Lyricist) in 2011.
- Sachal Sarmast Award, Sachal Sarmast Yadgar Committee, Khairpur, Sindh: Awarded for (Best Poet) 2000.
- Ustad Bukhari “Sangat” Award Sindhi Adabi Sangat, Sindh: Awarded for the (Best poetry book of the year) “To Bin Kehra Chanwra” - 1992.
- The Millennium Life Time Achievement Award, South Asia Publication, Karachi, Sindh: Awarded for the (outstanding performance in the field of literature), August 2006.

== COVID-19 ==
During the COVID pandemic, Ayaz Gul recorded a public awareness message for Radio Pakistan in Sindhi language.
