= Rashid Morai =

Sindhi activist, poet of resistance and teacher

- راشد مورائي
- Born: Syed Rashid Ali Shah; 5 March 1944 village Joraloe Taluka Moro district Nosheroferoz Sindh, British India
- Died: 24 March 2014 (aged 70)
- Education: Master's of Arts
- Occupations: Poet, Teacher
- Spouse
- Father: Syed Saeed Ali “Khadim”
- Relatives: Syed Roshan Ali Shah (Brother), Syed Masoom Ali Shah (Brother)
- Writing career
- Pen name: "راشد"
- Genre: Aesthetic nationalism
- Subject: Poetry
- Notable work: Poetry Books
- Notable awards: Latif Award
- Movement: Progressive

Rashid Morai (Sindhi: راشد مورائي), original name Syed Rashid Ali Shah was born on 5 March 1944 at village Joraloe Taluka Moro Naushahro Feroze District. He was an activist, poet of resistance and teacher. He died on 24 March 2014.

== Early life ==
His father Syed Saeed Ali “Khadim” who was also a folk and classical poet evacuated from their parental village due to a flood demolishing their village. They came and settled in Moro town, where their family remained so far.

== Education ==
Rashid Morai, got Master of Arts and Bachelor of Education, and entered in professional career, he was appointed as a teacher.

== Literary career ==
From forefather, Rashid Morai had a poetic family. His father was a good classical poet, even his brothers Syed Roshan Ali Shah (Pen name Roshan) and Syed Masoom Ali Shah (Pen name Nimarno) were also poets. Rashid Morai got poetic sense from his family. He had written several songs and poetry which is sung by various Sindhi singers. His poetry gives the fragrance of revolutionary sentiments. His famous poetic lines are:

دل جي ويران رڻ تي ڪڪر بانورا
ٿورڙو به وسين ها ته ڇا ٿي ٿيئي

== Political affiliation ==
He remained close fellow of G. M. Syed, who was great mystic philosopher and pioneer of Sindhi national movement. Rashid Morai’s major poetry is revolving on this movement and he wrote variety of poetry on Sindhi Nationalism.

== Publications ==
Some of his famous books are: Sindhrri Jo Sodau (1970), Mahndi Sanda Geet (1986) and Dil jo Shahr (1993) and almost 50 books are still pending for publishing.

== Awards ==
He received several awards like: Marvi Academy Medal, Latif Award, Sindhi Adabi Sangat Award etc.

== Death ==
Rashid Morai died on 24 March 2014.
