= Ahmad Khan Madhosh =

Sindhi language poet (1931–2010)

- احمد خان مدهوش
- Born: Ahmad Khan Soomro; 5 April 1931; Village Sultan Chandio, Khairpur Nathan Shah, Sindh, British India
- Died: 26 July 2010 (aged 79); Karachi, Pakistan
- Education: Sindhi Final Johi
- Occupations: Poet, teacher
- Children: Khalil Arif Soomro
- Writing career
- Subject: Poetry
- Notable works: Nazar mein Nazar Band; Dil Joon Galhiyoon
- Literary movement: Progressive

Ahmad Khan Madhosh (Sindhi:احمد خان مدهوش; Urdu: احمد خان مدہوش) (b.5 April 1931, d. 26 June 2010) was a famous poet of Sindhi language.

== Early life ==
He was born at the village of Sultan Chandio near Khairpur Nathan Shah, Dadu District. He was Soomro by caste. He passed the examination of Sindhi final from Johi which was equal to matriculation and joined the profession of teacher.

== Contribution ==
He was a renowned poet of the Sindhi language and started to create poetry in 1960 and his first poem appeared in the Quarterly Mehran (magazine) by Sindhi Adabi Board Jamshoro Sindh. His two poetry books Nazar mein Nazar Band and Dil Joon Galihiyoon were published. Many Sindhi singers, especially, Mumtaz Lashari, Manzoor Sakhirani and others have sung his songs.

== Death ==
Madhosh died on 26 June 2010 in Karachi due to cancer. and was buried at Johi. He was 79 years old and left behind two son Khalil Soomro and four daughters.
