= Parwano Bhatti =

Sindhi-language poet (1934–2016)

- Born: Mewo Khan Bhatti; 6 February 1934
- Died: 1 December 2016 (aged 82); Hyderabad, Pakistan
- Occupation: Poet

Parwano Bhatti (6 February 1934 – 1 December 2016) was a prominent Sindhi language poet, writer and journalist. He died at the age of 82.
