= Sarkash Sindhi =

Prominent poet of Sindhi language

- Born: Abdul Majeed Chandio; 1 October 1940; Mehar, Sindh, British India
- Died: 5 March 2012 (aged 71); Sindh
- Occupation: Poet
- Spouse: unknown (m. 1900; died 2012)
- Writing career
- Pen name: Sarkash Sindhi
- Language: Sindhi

Sarkash Sindhi (Sindhi: سرڪش سنڌي) (1 October 1940 - 5 March 2012) was a poet from Sindh, Pakistan.

== Early life ==
Sarkash Sindhi was born on 1 October 1940 in Palipota. His early education came in his native village. Later his parents moved to Jawabpur.

== Career ==
Afterward, he settled in Ratodero and then moved to Larkana. He worked as a primary school teacher and retired from service as a high school teacher.

His birth name was Abdul Majeed Chandio.

He fathered Raziya Nayab (a.k.a. Nayab Sarkash Sindhi) and the son of religious scholar Maulana Abdullah Chandio, who became a prominent poet of Sindhi language.

== Works ==
He wrote nine books of poetry. His main works are:

- Derd-e-dil, Amun Aab-e-Hayat

- Piyar aen Azadi

- Sindhu Gai thi

- Samund Chholiyoon

- Tahak

- Zindagi ji Goonj

== Personal life ==
He raised two daughters and a son. He died on 5 March 2012 due to cancer.
