= Sobhraj Nirmaldas Sujansingani =

Indian writer

- Born: 27 February 1883; Hyderabad, Bombay Presidency, British India
- Died: 15 March 1956 (aged 73); India
- Occupations: Writer, poet, historian

Sobhraj Nirmaldas Sujansingani (27 February 1883 – 15 March 1956), also known as Fani, was an Indian prose writer and poet of Sindhi language works. He wrote very valuable books on the history and archaeological sites of Sindh. He was also a scholar of Arabic and Persian.

== Biography ==
Sobhraj Nirmaldas was born in a literary Hindu family of Hyderabad, Sindh on 27 February 1883. His father Nirmaldas Fatehchand Sujansingani was a renowned scholar of Arabic, Persian and Sindhi languages, who wrote a number of historical novels in Sindhi. Sobhraj got early education from Hyderabad and passed matriculation examination with first class first position. He started his career as a Mukhtiarkar and retired as a Deputy Collector in 1937.

He died on 15 March 1956.

== Contributions ==
Sobhraj began to compose small poems at the age of 10. He has used his pen name "Fani" in his poems. He was one of the best Ghazal poets during the 1920s to 1950s. Like his father, he was a scholar of Arabic, Persian, Sindhi and Sanskrit. As an essayist, he has mainly written reflective and thought provoking essays. He collected history of 80 cities and towns of Sindh and wrote very valuable scholarly articles on historical sites of Sindh. Most of his articles are scattered in various magazines which are needed to be collected and compiled in book form.

In 1940, G.M. Syed, the then Education Minister of Sindh constituted Central Advisory Board for Sindhi Literature. There were 12 members of this Board. Sobhraj Nirmaldas was one of those board members (from 1940 to 1947).

== Published books ==
Some of his published books (all in Sindhi language) are listed below:

- Khayali Jhalka (Glimpes of Thought), 1941
- Chita Phulwari (Flower Bed of Consciousness)
- Roohani Tajala (Spiritual Splendors)
- Tarjuma-e-Gulstan (Translation of Gulstan from Persian)
