= Tajal Bewas =

Pakistani writer, teacher and government official

- تاجل بيوس
- Born: Taj Mohammed Samoo; 22 September 1938; Village Dargah Pir Hayat Shah, Taluka Sobho Dero, Khairpur, Sindh
- Died: 13 December 2008 (aged 70); Karachi, Sindh
- Education: University of Sindh
- Occupations: Poet, writer and journalist
- Writing career
- Pen name: "بيوس"
- Genre: Aesthetic
- Subjects: Poetry, journalism
- Movement: Progressive

Tajal Bewas (original name Taj Mohammed Samoo) (Sindhi: تاجل بيوس) was born on 22 September 1938 in Village Dargah Pir Hayat Shah, Taluka Sobho Dero, Khairpur, Sindh. He was a Sindhi- and Urdu-language poet, novelist, short-story writer, teacher and government official. He died on 13 December 2008 due to brain hemorrhage in Karachi.

== Life ==
Bewas was born in Pir Hayat Shah village, Khairpur district. His received his education from local schools and the Gambat High School before completing a Master of Arts degree in Economics as an external candidate with Sindh University. After completing his education, he taught English in his home town.

Bewas also served as a government official before his retirement, and was registrar for several companies. He was also a secretary for the Pakistani government and registrar of companies for the government of Sindh province.

He was a resident of Karachi when he died at 70. A week before his death, he had a stroke and was sent to at Liaquat National Hospital, where he died. Bewas had arranged musical programs at Chowkundi graveyard, a historical cemetery, and was buried there, as he had wanted.

Upon his death, The Nation called Bewas "legendary" and The News International called him "renowned".

His poem, "Sindh Munhji Aman Soonh Tuhinji Mathan Chha Likhi Chha Likhan" is considered "the national anthem of Sindhis in India", according to The Regional Times, which reported after his death: "He was known across Pakistan and India and many singers of both countries sung his poetry for radio and television". Bewas was the author of 44 books, 34 of them published, including Andaz-e-Bayan Aur, a collection of Urdu poetry.

"He tried to experiment in all native and modern forms of poetry" and was called a Sindhi classical form "Bait", The News International of Karachi reported upon his death. Fellow Sindhi poet Naseer Soomro said after his death that "I always saw Tajal Bewas not only as a great poet but a generous human being too. He was aware of the techniques of the poetry and rhythms of music."
