= Mir Abdul Rasool Mir =

Sindhi Language poet and educationist (1950–2019)

- مير عبدالرسول مير
- Born: 7 April 1950; Village Mehar Ali Khan Talpur, Taluka Gambat, District Khairpur Mirs, Sindh, Pakistan
- Died: 19 December 2019 (aged 69)
- Occupations: Poet and Teacher
- Writing career
- Pen name: Mir
- Genres: Ghazal, Kafi, Nazem, Bait
- Subjects: Love, Patriotism, Brotherhood
- Father: Mehar Ali Khan Talpur

Mir Abdul Rasool Mir (Sindhi: مير عبدالرسول مير) (7 April 1950 - 19 December 2019) was an educationist and Sindhi language poet of Pakistan. He was popular all over Sindh for his romantic poetry. His poems have been sung by a number of popular Sindhi singers.

== Childhood and Qualifications ==
Mir Abdul Rasool Mir was born on 7 April 1950 at village Mehar Ali Khan Talpur, Taluka Gambat, District Khairpur Mirs of Sindh, Pakistan. His father Mir Mehar Ali Khan Talpur was a noble person of his village. He received a master's degree in physics from the University of Sindh, Jamshoro. He started his career as a lecturer of physics in Education Department. He retired as Principal of Sachal Sarmast College, Hyderabad, Sindh.

== Career as a poet ==
He started composing poems at an early age. He was greatly inspired by the poetry of Makhdoom Muhammad Zaman Talibul Moula, a scholar and spiritual leader of his time. The theme of his poetry was romance, patriotism and brotherhood. A number of popular singers including Abida Perveen, Ashique Nizamani, Humaira Channa, Muhammad Yousif, Waheed Ali and others have sung his songs. Most of these songs have been recorded by Radio Pakistan's Hyderabad station. His poetry collection titled as Soonhan Wiroonhan (Sindhi: سونهن ورونهن) has been published.

He received a number of awards including the following:

- Burdo Sindhi Award (2005)
- Jamaluddin Bhatti Award (2005)
- Latif Award (2005)
- Sachal Award
- Poet of the year award (2006)

== Death ==
Mir Abdul Rasool Mir died on 19 December 2019.
