= Mehran (magazine) =

Mehran (Sindhi: مهراڻ) is a quarterly literary magazine of the Sindhi Adabi Board in Sindh, Pakistan. It is the oldest magazine in Pakistan and was started in 1947. Thousands of Mehran editions have been published. The magazine writes about all Sindhi literary people in its editions. It usually creates a particular edition for a single person, like Shaikh Ayaz, Hassam-ud-Din Rashidi, Mirza Qalich Baig, and many more. Mehran also provides an opportunity for new writers to write in it and many famous scholars started their careers writing in the magazine.

In 2007 the Sindhi Adabi Board could not publish the magazine due to financial problems.
