= Daud Kamal =

Pakistani poet (1935–1987)

- Born: January 4, 1935; Abbottabad, British Raj
- Died: May 12, 1987 (aged 52); Peshawar, Pakistan
- Occupations: Poet, Professor of English language
- Spouse: Parveen Daud Kamal

Daud Kamal (4 January 1935 – 5 December 1987) (Urdu: داؤد کمال) was a Pakistani poet who wrote most of his work in the English language.

His poetry was influenced by modernist English-language poets like Ezra Pound, W. B. Yeats and T. S. Eliot.

== Education and career ==
Born in 1935, in Abbottabad, British Raj, the son of Chaudhry Mohammad Ali, who served as the vice-chancellor of the University of Peshawar, and founded the Jinnah College for Women in 1964, Daud Kamal received his early education from the Burn Hall Abbottabad, followed by Burn Hall Srinagar, before going to the Islamia College Peshawar. He completed his Bachelor of Arts degree from the University of Peshawar and the Tripos from the University of Cambridge in England.

For 29 years, he had also served as a teacher and chairman of University of Peshawar's Department of English.

== Books ==
- Remote Beginnings
- Compass of love and other poems
- Recognitions
- Before the Carnations Wither

Professor Daud Kamal also translated from Urdu into English selected poems of Faiz Ahmed Faiz and Mirza Ghalib.

== Awards and recognition ==
It has been said that during the 1970s he won "three gold medals in three international poetry competitions sponsored by the Triton College, U.S.A."

He received the Faiz Ahmed Faiz award in 1987 and a posthumous Pride of Performance award in 1990 from the President of Pakistan.

== Death ==
Professor Daud Kamal died in the United States on 5 December 1987. Later he was buried in the cemetery of University of Peshawar, where he taught for 29 years, opposite the Pashto Academy.

== See also ==
- List of Pakistani poets
