= Sindhi Language Authority =

Autonomous institution of the Government of Sindh, Pakistan

- سنڌي ٻوليءَ جو با اختيار ادارو
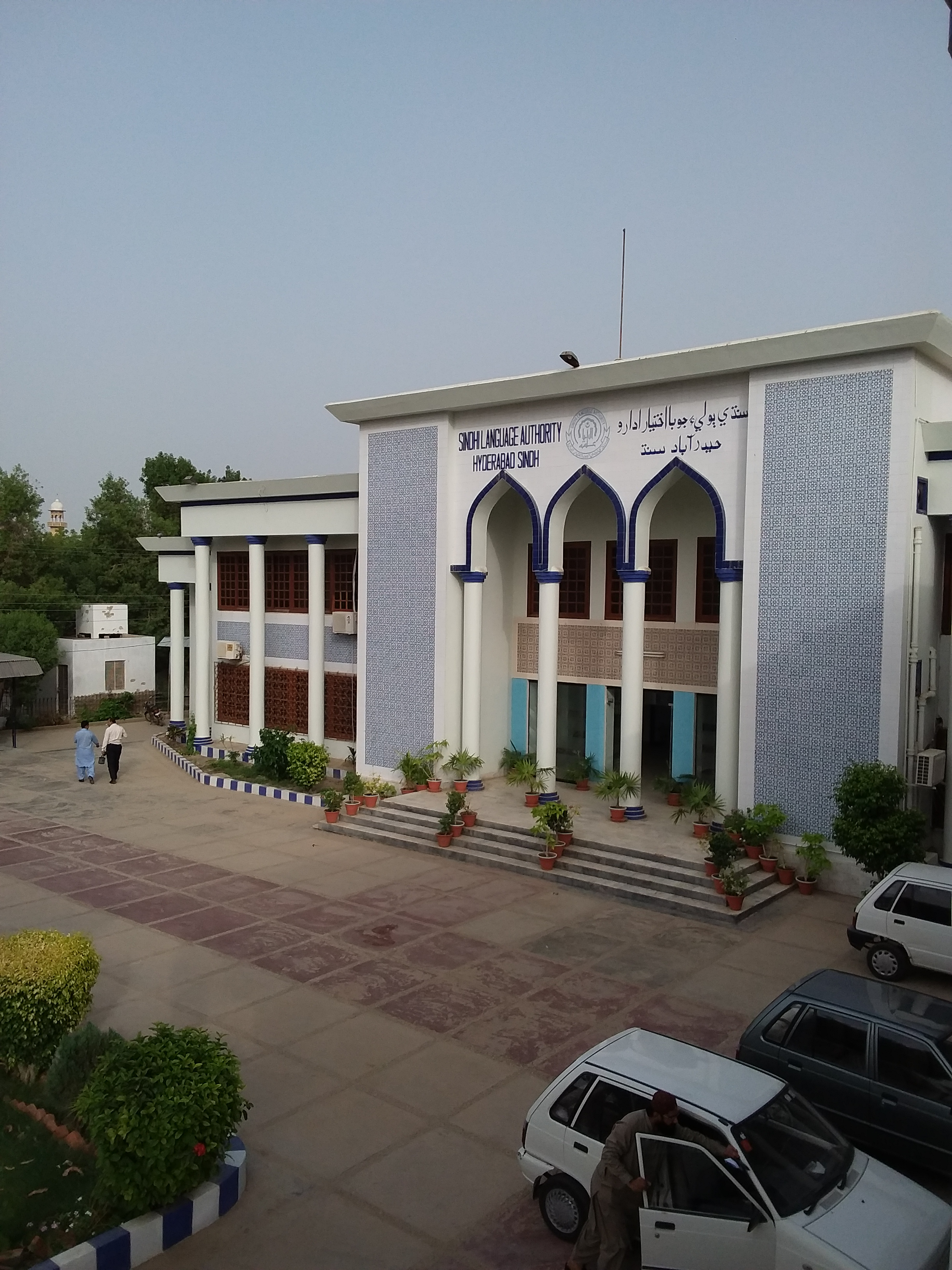
- Headquarters of the SLA
- Abbreviation: SLA
- Formation: 1992; 34 years ago
- Founder: Nabi Bakhsh Baloch
- Type: Autonomous institution under the Government of Sindh
- Headquarters: SLA Headquarters
- Location: Rani Bagh, Qasimabad, Hyderabad, Sindh, Pakistan
- Official language: Sindhi
- Chairperson: Dr.Sher Muhammad Mehrani
- Website: sindhila.org

The Sindhi Language Authority (abbreviated as SLA; Sindhi: سنڌي ٻوليءَ جو با اختيار ادارو, romanized: Sindhī Bōlī’a Jō Bā Ixtiyār Idārō) is an autonomous institution under the Government of the Pakistani province of Sindh. It fosters the Sindhi language and literature, works to develop and promote the language in Sindh, and original research in the language. It comes under the administrative control of the Culture, Tourism and Antiquities Department.

The SLA was established under the act Use of Sindhi Language Act 1972, and the Teaching, Promotion and Use of Sindhi Language (Amendment) Act, 1990 of the Government of Sindh. There is a Board of Governors to frame the policies for achieving the aims and objectives of authority and ensure their implementation. The first Board of Governors was constituted under the chairmanship of Nabi Bakhsh Khan Baloch, a scholar and writer.

Since the establishment of the Sindhi Language Authority, different scholars and writers were appointed as its chairman, who have contributed to the development and promotion of the Sindhi language.

== Objectives ==
The Sindhi Language Authority (SLA) explores strategies to advance, educate, and encourage the utilization of Sindhi. Additionally, it upholds and enhances the standing of Sindhi across official and semi-official documentation. SLA also oversees the proper application of Sindhi in official records, manuals, publications, textbooks, newspapers, television and radio broadcasts, periodic publications, and other enduring documents.

== Organizational structure ==
Sindhi Language Authority has been administratively divided into seven sections for achieving its objectives which are: Publication & Research Section which deals all kinds of books publication, research journals and magazines, Program Sections which arranges day to day planned programs, dramas linguistic seminars and symposiums, Encyclopedia Sindhiana which has vital team of researchers who collects data from all over the Sindh and compile it in alphabetically order and publish it in series of the Encyclopedia, Dictionary Section deals the etymology and compilation of the Sindhi Language thesaurus, Language Development Project section (Planning & development) arranges the helping seminars and add-on sittings with Literary and academics departments under the umbrella of Government of Sindh for development & implementing Sindhi Language in institutions, Muhammad Ibrahim Joyo Audio & Video Studio where multimedia programs, interviews and tradition folk literary people of Sindh shares their creative skills poetry and Sindhi Folk wisdom and Sindhi Informatics section develops web portals of Sindhi Literature & Sindhi programming of digitization in Sindhi Computing.

The authority has been administratively divided into three departments known as Publication, Programs and Institute of Sindhi Computing.

=== Publication & Research Section ===
On the publication and research Section also known as Encyclopedia Sindhiana, dictionaries, classical Sindhi books, books for children research material on Sindhi language and literature Indus script and Indus civilization etc and other different descriptions have been published. A news report in 2015 suggested numerous significant issues regarding the governance and academic rigour of SLA publications.

=== Program ===
The Program side arranges seminars, symposiums, lectures, training workshops and conferences on various subjects relating to the promotion, teaching and use of Sindhi language. Similarly, “Ibrahim Joyo AV Studio” has prepared significant AV material regarding preservation of dialects and sub-dialects of Sindhi language.

=== Institute of Sindhi Computing ===
Institute of Sindhi Computing is the youngest section of the Authority. Yet it has achieved progress in Sindhi Computing. It has launched several Android based mobile applications. Moreover Sindhi language has been registered on Microsoft cloud and added Sindhi language in core programming of Google. SLA is also the member of Microsoft Partnership Networks. On 21 February 2017, SLA launched first Sindhi optical character recognition by the Team leader Amar Fayaz Buriro who was continuously working on this project and finally launched its first beta version.

The authority established the Sindhi Dictionary Board for the compilation of dictionary.

The Authority wrote letters to the private schools of the province to teach Sindhi language subject in their schools and it also demanded sign boards on the national highways and roads be written in Sindhi.

== List of SLA chairpersons ==
Since the establishment of Sindhi Language Authority below mentioned Scholars were appointed as chairman.

S #	Name	From	To
1	Nabi Bakhsh Khan Baloch	15 Feb 1991	6 Mar 1994
2	Nawaz Ali Shouq	6 Mar 1994	3 Apr 1995
3	Nabi Bakhsh G. Qazi	3 Apr 1995	17 Nov 1996
4	Mumtaz Mirza ( Additional Charge)	17 Nov 1996	6 Jan 1997
5	Amar Jaleel	7 Jan 1997	5 May 1997
6	Abdul Hameed Memon Sindhi	6 May 1997	22 Jul 1997
7	Ghulam Ali Allana	22 Jul 1998	1 Aug 2001
8	Mohammad Qasim Bughio	1 Aug 2001	15 Feb 2005
9	N.D.Jatoi (Additional Charge)	16 Feb 2005	15 Sep 2005
10	Abdul Qadir Junejo	15 Sep 2005	10 May 2008
11	Fahmida Hussain	28 May 2008	13 March 2015
12	Aftab Ahmed Memon (Acting)	15 March 2015	14 May 2015
13	Sarfaraz Rajar (Temporary)	15 May 2015	14 Oct 2016
14	Dr. Abdul Ghafoor Memon	14 Oct 2016	31 Oct 2018
15	Mr. Akbar Laghari (Additional Charge)	26 Dec 2018	22 Sept 2019
16	Mr. Pervez Ahmed Sehar (Additional Charge)	22 Sept 2019	8 Nov 2019
17	Mr. Akbar Laghari (Additional Charge)	9 Nov 2019	28 July 2020
18	Prof. Dr. Muhammad Ali Manjhi	28 July 2020	4 March 2022
19	Dr. Naseem ul Ghani Sahito (Additional Charge)	4 March 2022	4 August 2022
20	Dr. Ishaq Samejo	5 Aug 2022	08 January 2026
21	Dr. Sher Mahrani	8 January 2026	To date
