= Shaikh Ayaz =

Sindhi language poet (1923–1997)

- شيخ اياز
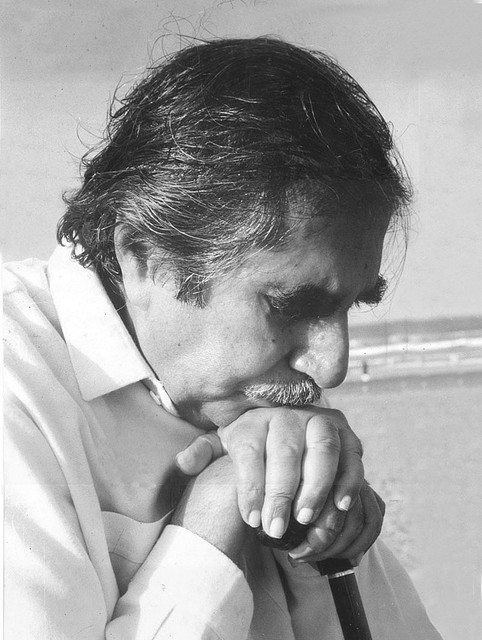
- Born: Mubarak Ali Shaikh; 2 March 1923; Shikarpur Sindh, British India
- Died: 28 December 1997 (aged 74); Karachi, buried at Bhit Shah
- Citizenship: Pakistani And Sindhi
- Occupations: Poet, lawyer, vice chancellor of Sindh University
- Notable work: Urdu translation of Shah Jo Risalo
- Style: Romantic; Aesthetic
- Movement: Progressive
- Spouse: Zareena Ayaz
- Children: Two sons and 3 daughters
- Awards: Sitara-i-Imtiaz

Shaikh Ayaz SI (Sindhi: شيخ اياز; Urdu: شیخ ایاز) born Mubarak Ali Shaikh (Sindhi: مبارڪ علي شيخ; Urdu: مبارک علی شیخ; March 1923 – 28 December 1997) was a Sindhi language poet, prose writer and former vice-chancellor of the University of Sindh. He is counted as one of the prominent and great Sindhi poets of Pakistan in general and Sindh in particular. He authored more than 50 books on poetry, biographies, plays and short stories in both the Sindhi and Urdu languages. His translations of Shah Jo Risalo, which was written by the 18th-century Sufi poet Shah Abdul Latif Bhittai, from Sindhi to Urdu language established him as an authority in his domain.

He was awarded the Sitara-i-Imtiaz, Pakistan's third-highest civilian award, for his literary works and is regarded as a "revolutionary and romantic poet".

In 2018, a public university, Shaikh Ayaz University, was established in Shikarpur, Sindh, and was named after him.

== Early life ==
Shaikh Ayaz was born as Mubarak Ali on 2 March 1923 in Shikarpur, Sindh. He was a lawyer but he also served as the vice-chancellor of Sindh University. In his book Shah Jo Risalo he has discussed in details about his struggle and always mentioned that in the Islamic country like Pakistan the only true friend he found was Deewan Parmanand Gangwani whom he considers to be the bravest person he met in his life and always consider Deewan Gangwani the finest person one would have as a friend. Parmanand Gangwani died in 1983. He died on 28 December 1997 in Karachi, Sindh after suffering from cardiac-arrest - leaving behind two sons and a daughter.

== Literary career ==
Ayaz is one of the major voices in twentieth-century poetry. His literary career spanned almost six decades and covered a wide range of poetry and prose forms, ranging from the traditional bait, wa'i,nazm,"azad nazm" and ghazal to plays in verse. He wrote short stories, Operas, essays, poetry, travelogues, diaries, an autobiography and the translation of Shah Jo Risalo in Urdu. He also wrote poetry in Urdu which is spread to two books, Booye Gul, Nala-i-dil" and Neel Kanth Aur Neem Ke Pate. His first book of poetry was in Urdu named Boi gul, Nalai dil and his first book of poetry in Sindhi was, " Bhounr Bhire Akas"

=== Romantic poetry ===
Ayaz has contributed new work contribution to the sindhi literature. before him, the ancient sindhi poets writes on abstract or spiritual love which is not physical Love; Platonic Love. Due to the modern effect of the world, he considered sex; Physical Love as more attractive in the real Love.

== Awards ==
- Sitara-i-Imtiaz
- Sitare Jurat
- Latif Award

== Bibliography ==
In Sindhi poetry

- ڀنور ڀري آڪاس'
- ڪلھي پاتم ڪينرو
- ڪي جي ٻيجل ٻوليو
- وڄون وسڻ آيون
- ڪپر ٿو ڪن ڪري
- لڙيون سج لڪن م
- پتڻ ٿو پور ڪري
- ٽڪرا ٽڪرا صليب جا
- پن ڇڻ پڄاڻان
- واٽون ڦلن ڇانئيون
- چنڊ چنبيلي ول
- رڻ تي رم جھم
- راج گھاٽ تي چنڊ
- ڀڳت سنگھ کي ڦاھي
- بڙ جي ڇانو اڳي کان گھاٽي
- اڪن نيرا ڦليا
- سُر نارائڻ شيام
- اُڀر چنڊ پس پرين
- ھينئڙو ڏاڙھون گل جيئن
- ڪتين ڪر موڙيا جڏھن
- ننڊ وليون
- چنڊ ڳليون
- سر لوھيڙا ڳڀا
- سورج مکي سانجھ
- جر ڏيئا جھمڪن
- ھرڻ اکي ڪيڏانھن
- گھاٽ مٿان گھنگھور گھٽا
- سانجھي سمنڊ سپون
- ڪونجون ڪرڪن روھ تي
- وڏا وڻ وڻڪار جا
- تون ڇپر تون ڇانء
- دودي سومري جو موت (Death of Dodo Soomro)

== In Sindhi prose ==
- سفيد وحشي
- پنھل کان پو۽
- بقول اياز
- جي ڪاڪ ڪڪوريا ڪاپڙي
- ساھيوال جيل ڊائري
- خط انٽرويو تقريرون
- ڪراچي جا ڏينھن ۽ راتيون
- ڪٿي نه ڀڃبو ٿڪ مسافر

== In Urdu ==
- Booye Gul (بوئے گُل)
- Nala-i-dil (نالۂ دِل)
- Neel Kanth Aur Neem Ke Pate (نیل کنتھ اور نیم کے پتے

== See also ==
- Sindhi people
- Sindhi poetry
- Sindhi literature
- List of Sindhi language poets
- Shah Abdul Latif Bhittai
- Shikarpur, Pakistan
- Sindhi Shaikh
