= Indian independence movement =

Movement to end British rule in India

The Indian independence movement was a series of political efforts from the mid-1880s to 1947 that took place in the Indian subcontinent with the aim of ending British colonial rule.

The first nationalistic movement took root when the Indian National Congress (INC) was formed in 1885. Prominent moderate leaders of the INC worked on demands such as greater economic rights for Indians and the right to appear for Indian Civil Service exams in British India.

The first half of the 20th century saw a progressively radical approach towards self-rule. This began with protests against the Partition of Bengal (1905), which exposed the limits of the moderate leaders' reformist agenda, and evolved into the Non-cooperation Movement (1919–1922), which demanded non-cooperation with colonial authorities. Momentum grew steadily through the Civil Disobedience Movement (1929–1931) that called for active disobedience to the colonial government, and culminated in the Quit India Movement (1942), which categorically demanded the end of British colonial presence in India, ultimately resulted in the transfer of power in 1947.

The stages of the independence struggle in the 1920s were characterised by the leadership of Mahatma Gandhi and Congress's adoption of his policy of non-violence and civil disobedience. Some of the leading followers of Gandhi's ideology were Pandit Motilal Nehru, Sarojini Naidu, Jawaharlal Nehru, Vallabhbhai Patel, Abdul Ghaffar Khan, and Maulana Azad. Intellectuals such as Rabindranath Tagore, and Subramania Bharati, spread patriotic awareness. Female leaders such as Sarojini Naidu, Vijaya Lakshmi Pandit, Pritilata Waddedar, and Kasturba Gandhi promoted the emancipation of Indian women and their participation in the freedom struggle.

A few leaders adopted a more violent approach, which grew in popularity following the passage of Rowlatt Act that permitted indefinite detention without trial. The Act sparked protests across India, particularly in the Punjab Province, where these demonstrations were violently suppressed in the Jallianwala Bagh massacre.

The Indian independence movement was in constant ideological evolution. Essentially anti-colonial, it was supplemented by visions of independent economic development alongside a secular, democratic, republican, and civil-libertarian political structure. After the 1930s, the movement took on a strong socialist orientation. It culminated in the Indian Independence Act 1947, which ended Crown suzerainty and partitioned British India into the Dominion of India and the Dominion of Pakistan. On 26 January 1950, the Constitution of India came into effect, establishing the Republic of India, while the partitioned territories evolved into the independent nations of Pakistan and, later, Bangladesh.

== Background ==
The first European to reach India via the Atlantic Ocean was the Portuguese explorer Vasco da Gama, who reached Calicut in 1498 in search of spice. Just over a century later, the Dutch and English established trading outposts on the Indian subcontinent, with the first English trading post set up at Surat in 1613.

Over the next two centuries, the British (Note: The English colonial empire, including the territories and trading posts in Asia, came under British control following the union of England and Scotland in 1707.) defeated the Portuguese and Dutch but remained in conflict with the French. The decline of the Mughal Empire in the first half of the eighteenth century allowed the British to establish a foothold in Indian politics. During the Battle of Plassey, the East India Company's Army defeated Siraj ud-Daulah, the Nawab of Bengal, and the company established itself as a major player in Indian affairs. After the Battle of Buxar of 1764, it gained administrative rights over Bengal, Bihar and the Midnapur part of Odisha.

After the defeat of Tipu Sultan, most of southern India came either under the company's direct rule, or under its indirect political control in a subsidiary alliance. The Company subsequently seized control of regions ruled by the Maratha Empire, after defeating them in a series of wars. Much of Punjab was annexed in the year 1849, after the defeat of Sikh armies in the First (1845–46) and Second (1848–49) Anglo-Sikh Wars.

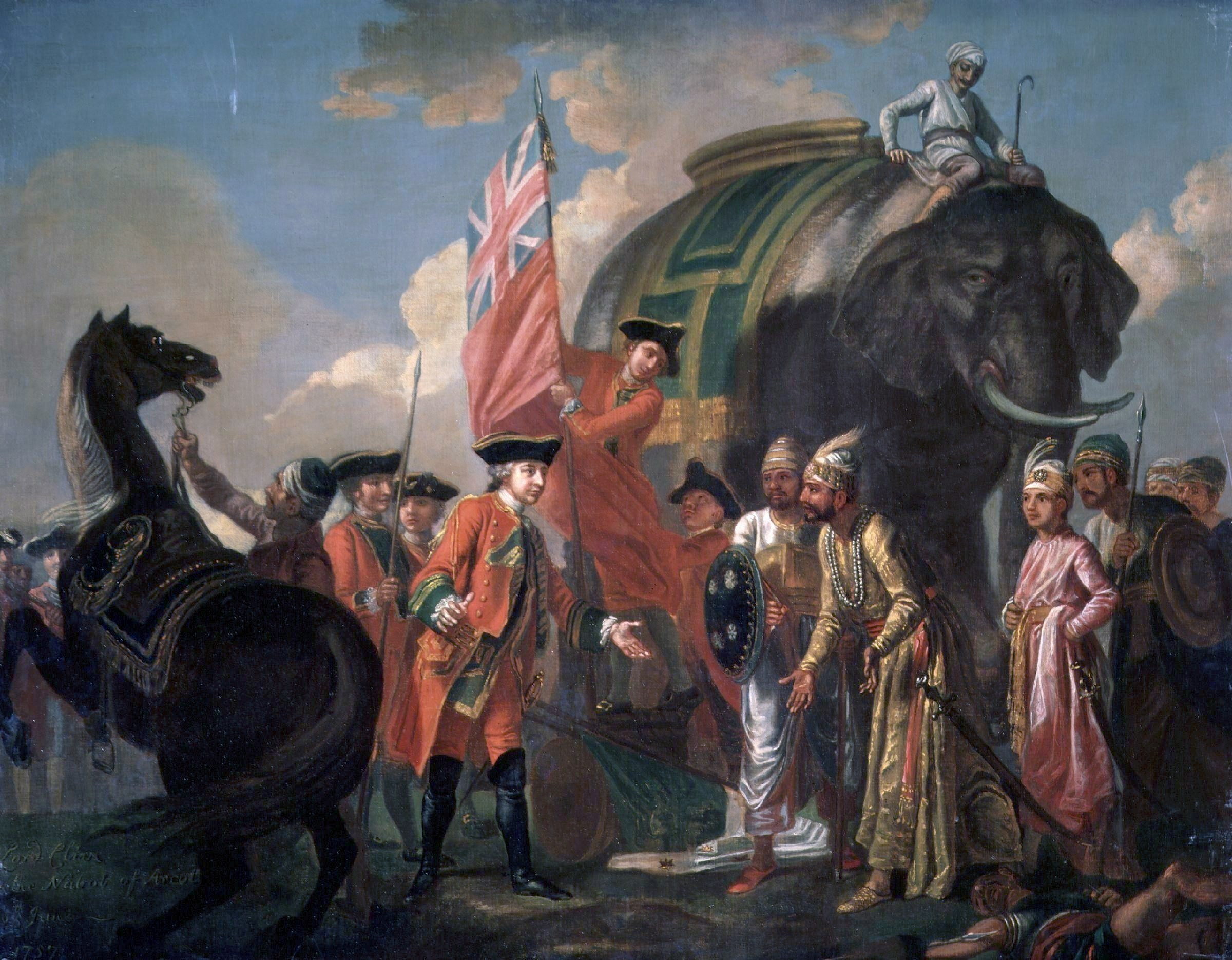
Robert Clive with Mir Jafar after the Battle of Plassey. Mir Jafar's betrayal of the Nawab Siraj-ud-Daulah of Bengal in Plassey made the battle one of the main factors of British supremacy in the sub-continent.

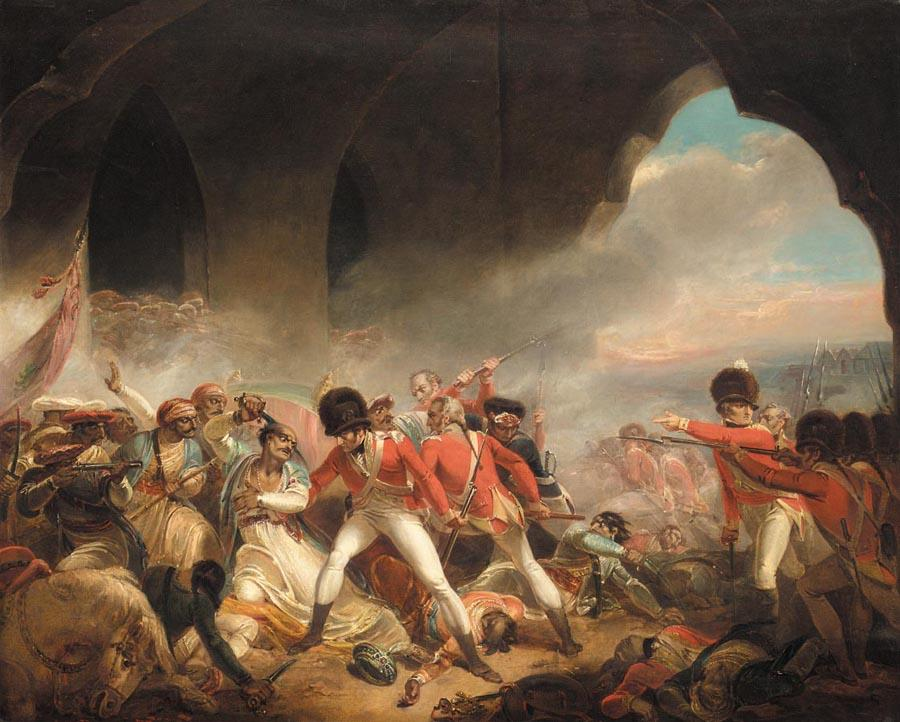
The Last Effort and Fall of Tippoo Sultaun by Henry Singleton, c. 1800. After the defeat of Tipu Sultan of Mysore, most of South India was now either under the company's direct rule, or under its indirect political control.

== Early resistance to Company rule ==
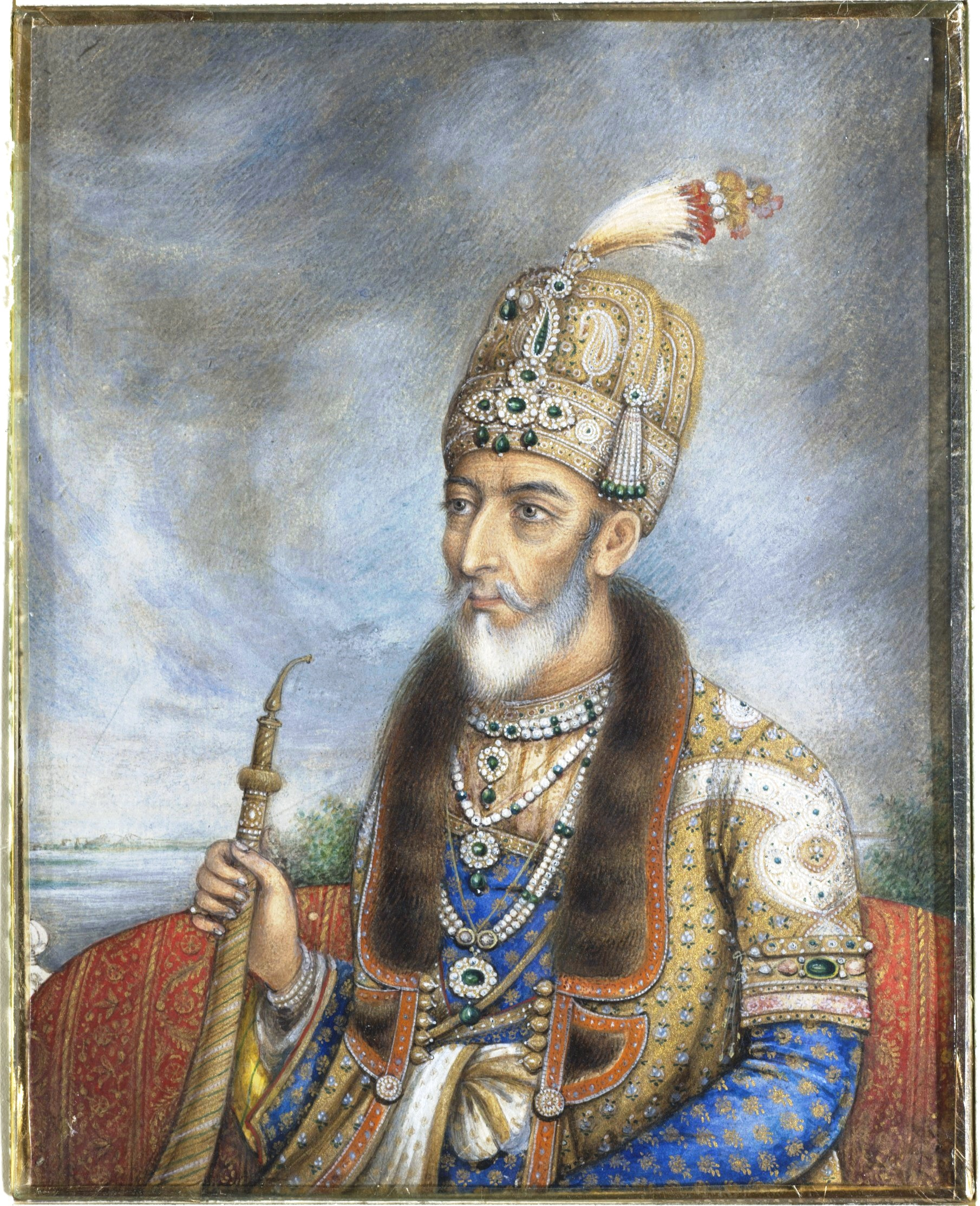
Bahadur Shah Zafar was declared the "Emperor of Hindustan" during the Indian Rebellion of 1857.

Maveeran Alagumuthu Kone was an early revolutionary against the British presence in Tamil Nadu. He became a military leader in the town of Ettayapuram and was defeated in battle against the British and Maruthanayagam's forces. He was executed in 1757. Puli Thevar opposed the Nawab of Arcot, who was supported by the British. Maruthanayagam Pillai was a commandant of the British East India Company's Madras Army. He was born in a Tamil Vellalar caste family in a village called Panaiyur in British India, what is now in Nainarkoil Taluk, Ramanathapuram District of Tamil Nadu, India. He converted to Islam and was named Muhammad Yusuf Khan. He was popularly known as Khan Sahib when he became the ruler of Madurai. He became a warrior in the Arcot troops, and later a commandant for the British East India Company troops. The British and the Arcot Nawab employed him to suppress the Polygar (a.k.a. Palayakkarar) uprising in South India. Later, he was entrusted to administer the Madurai country when the Madurai Nayak rule ended. He later fought a war against the British and the Arcot Nawab. A dispute arose with the British and the Arcot Nawab, and three of Khan's associates were bribed to capture him. He was captured during his morning prayer (Thozhugai) and hanged on 15 October 1764 at Sammatipuram near Madurai. Local legends state that he survived two earlier attempts at hanging, and that the Nawab feared Yusuf Khan would come back to life and so had his body dismembered and buried in different locations around Tamil Nadu. In Eastern India and across the country, Indigenous communities organised numerous uprising against the British and their fellow members, especially landlords and moneylenders. One of the earliest of these on record was led by Binsu Manki around 1771 over the transfer of Jharkhand to the East India Company. The Rangpur Dhing took place from 1782 to 1783 in nearby Rangpur, Bengal. Following Binsu Manki's revolt in Jharkhand, numerous uprisings across the region took place, including the rebellion led by Tilka Manjhi in 1784; Bhumij Revolt of Manbhum from 1798 to 1799; the Chero Uprising of Palamu in 1800 under the leadership of Bhukan Singh, and two uprising of the Munda community in Tamar region, during 1807 led by Dukan Mank, and 1819–20 under the leadership Bundu and Konta. The Ho Rebellion took place when the Ho community first came in contact with the British, from 1820 to 1821 near Chaibasa on the Roro River in West Singhbhum, but were defeated by the technologically enhanced colonial cavalry. A larger Bhumij Revolt occurred near Midnapur in Bengal, under the leadership of Ganga Narain Singh who had previously also been involved in co-leading the Chuar Rebellions in these regions from 1771 to 1809. Syed Mir Nisar Ali Titumir was an Islamic preacher who led a peasant uprising against the Hindu Zamindars of Bengal and the British during the 19th century. Along with his followers, he built a bamboo fort (Bansher Kella in Bengali) in Narkelberia Village, which gained a prominent place in Bengali folk legend. After the storming of the fort by British soldiers, Titumir died of his wounds on 19 November 1831. These rebellions lead to larger regional movements in Jharkhand and beyond such as the Kol Insurrection led by Singhray and Binray Manki, where the Kol (Munda, Oraon, Bhumij and Ho communities) united to rebel against the "outsiders" from 1830 -1833.

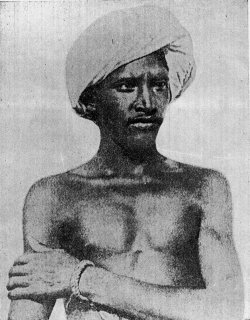
Birsa Munda, leader of Munda rebellion (Ulgulan)

The Santhal Hul was a movement of over 60,000 Santhals that happened from 1855 to 1857 (but started as early as 1784) and was particularly led by siblings – brothers Sidhu, Kanhu, Chand and Bhairav and their sisters Phulo and Jhano from the Murmu clan in its most fervent years that lead up to the Revolt of 1857. More than 100 years of such escalating rebellions created grounds for a large, impactful, millenarian movement in Eastern India that again shook the foundations of British rule in the region, under the leadership of Birsa Munda. Birsa Munda belonged to the Munda community and lead thousands of people from Munda, Oraon, and Kharia communities in "Ulgulaan" (revolt) against British political expansion and those who advanced it, against forceful conversions of Indigenous peoples into Christianity (even creating a Birsaite movement), and against the displacement of Indigenous peoples from their lands. To subdue these rising tensions which were getting increasingly out of control of the British, they aggressively set out to search for Birsa Munda, even setting up a reward for him. They brutally attacked the Dombari Hills where Birsa had repaired a water tank and made his revolutionary headquarters between 7–9 January 1900, murdering a minimum of 400 of the Munda warriors who had congregated there, akin to the attacks on the people at Jallianwallah Bagh, however, receiving much less attention. The hills are known as "Topped Buru" today – the mound of the dead. Birsa was ultimately captured in the Jamkopai forest in Singhbhum, and assassinated by the British in jail in 1900, with a rushed cremation/burial conducted to ensure his movement was subdued.

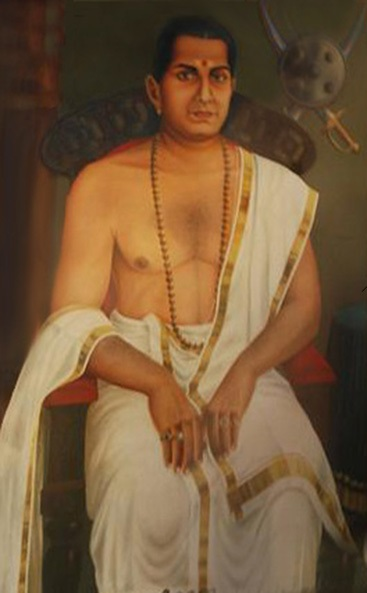
Pazhassi Raja, fought the British in a series of continuous struggles for 13 years during the Cotiote War.

The toughest resistance the Company experienced was offered by Mysore. The Anglo-Mysore Wars were a series of wars fought in over the last three decades of the 18th century between the Kingdom of Mysore on the one hand, and the British East India Company (represented chiefly by the Madras Presidency), and Maratha Confederacy and the Nizam of Hyderabad on the other. Hyder Ali and his successor Tipu Sultan fought a war on four fronts with the British attacking from the west, south, and east, while the Marathas and the Nizam's forces attacked from the north. The fourth war resulted in the overthrow of the house of Hyder Ali and Tipu (who was killed in the final war in 1799), and the dismantlement of Mysore to the benefit of the East India Company, which won and took control of much of India. Pazhassi Raja was the prince regent of the princely state of Cotiote in North Malabar, near Kannur, India between 1774 and 1805. He fought a guerrilla war with tribal people from Wynad supporting him. He was captured by the British, and his fort was razed to the ground.

In 1766 the Nizam of Hyderabad transferred the Northern Circars to the British authority. The independent king Jagannatha Gajapati Narayan Deo II of Paralakhemundi estate situated in today's Odisha and in the northernmost region of the then political division was continuously revolting against the French occupants since 1753 as per the Nizam's earlier handover of his estate to them on similar grounds. Narayan Deo II fought the British at Jelmur fort on 4 April 1768 and was defeated due to superior firepower of the British. He fled to the tribal hinterlands of his estate and continued his efforts against the British until his natural death on the Fifth of December 1771.

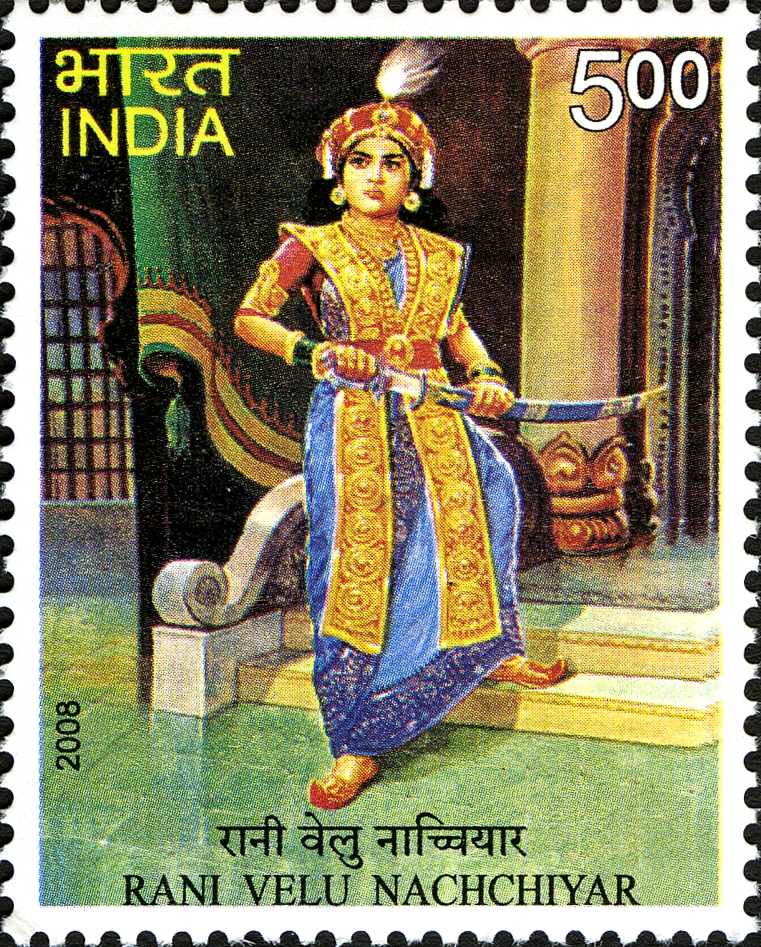
Velu Nachiyar, was one of the earliest Indian queens to fight against the British colonial power in India.

Rani Velu Nachiyar (1730–1796), was a queen of Sivaganga from 1760 to 1790. Rani Nachiyar was trained in war match weapons usage, martial arts like Valari, Silambam (fighting using stick), horse riding and archery. She was a scholar in many languages and she had proficiency with languages like French, English, and Urdu. When her husband, Muthuvaduganathaperiya Udaiyathevar, was killed in battle with British soldiers and the forces of the Nawab of Arcot, she was drawn into battle. She formed an army and sought an alliance with Gopala Nayaker and Hyder Ali to attack the British, whom she successfully challenged in 1780. When the inventories of the Britishers were discovered, she is said to have arranged a suicide attack by a faithful follower, Kuyili, dousing herself in oil and setting herself alight and walking into the storehouse. Rani formed a women's army named "Udaiyaal" in honour of her adopted daughter, who had died detonating a British arsenal. Rani Nachiyar was one of the few rulers who regained her kingdom, and ruled it for a decade more.

Veerapandiya Kattabomman was an eighteenth-century Polygar and chieftain from Panchalankurichi in Tamil Nadu, India who waged the Polygar war against the East India Company. He was captured by the British and hanged in 1799 CE. Kattabomman refused to accept the sovereignty of East India Company, and fought against them. Dheeran Chinnamalai was a Kongu Nadu chieftain and Palayakkarar from Tamil Nadu who fought against the East India Company. After Kattabomman and Tipu Sultan's deaths, Chinnamalai sought the help of Marathas and Maruthu Pandiyar to attack the British at Coimbatore in 1800. The British forces managed to stop the armies of the allies, forcing Chinnamalai to attack Coimbatore on his own. His army was defeated and he escaped from the British forces. Chinnamalai engaged in guerrilla warfare and defeated the British in battles at Cauvery in 1801, Odanilai in 1802 and Arachalur in 1804.

In 1804 the King of Khordha, Kalinga was deprived of his traditional rights to the Jagannath Temple. In retaliation, a group of armed Paiks attacked the British at Pipili. Jayee Rajguru, the chief of Army of Kalinga requested a common alliance against the British. After Rajguru's death, Bakshi Jagabandhu launched an armed revolution against the East India Company's rule in Odisha. This is now known as the Paik Rebellion, the first uprising against the British East India Company.

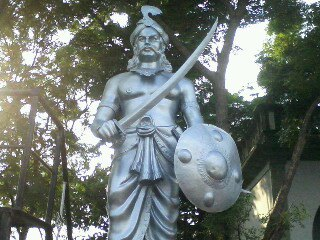
Puli Thevar

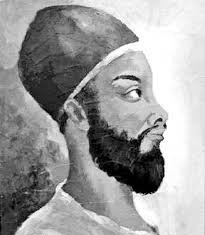
Syed Mir Nisar Ali (Titumir)

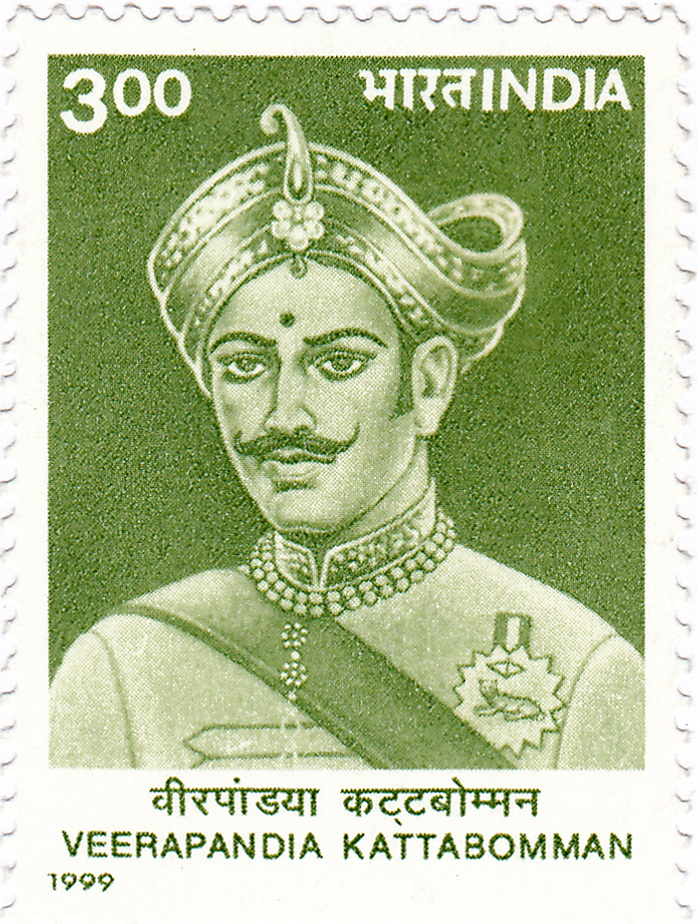
Veerapandiya Kattabomman

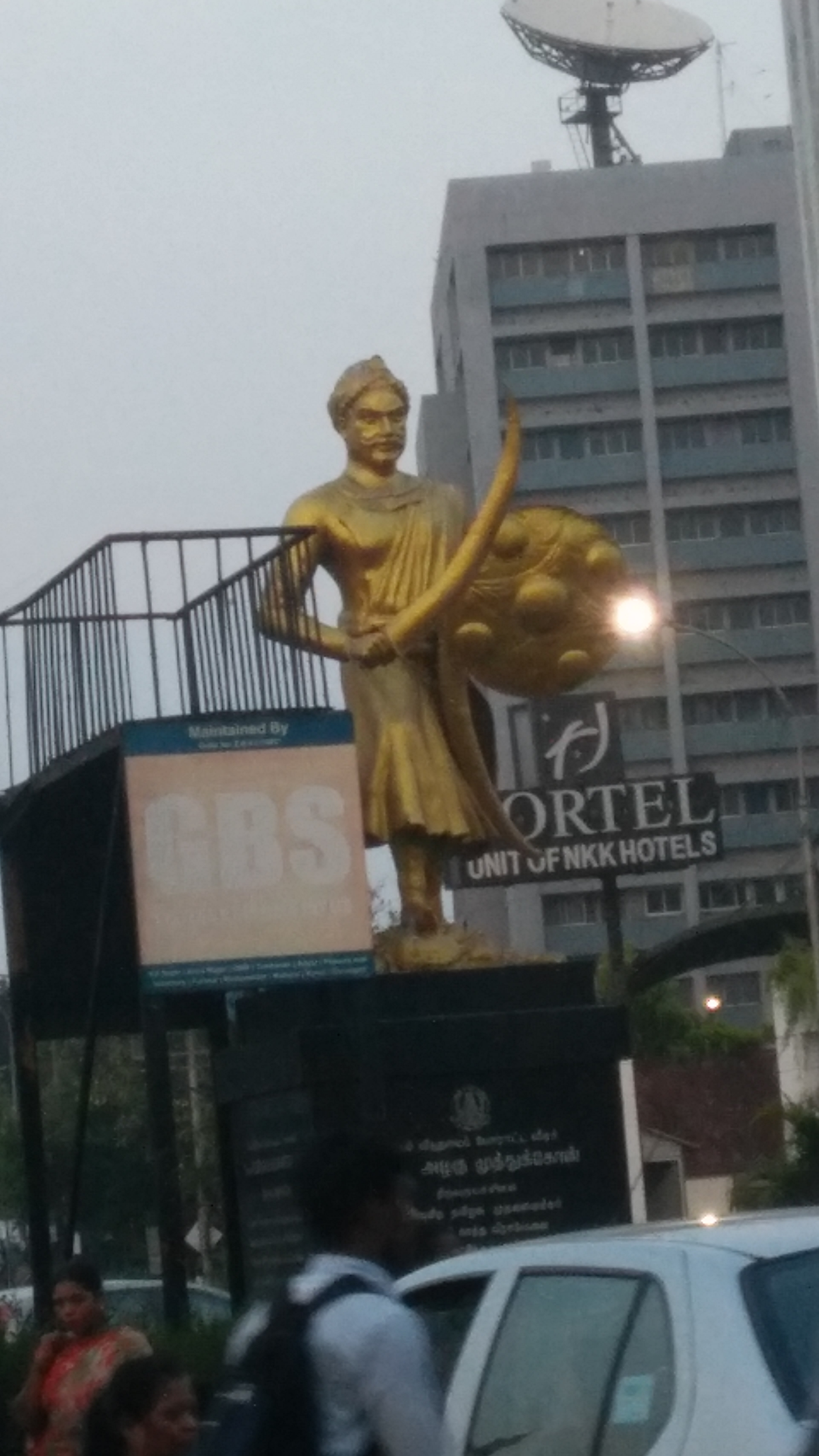
Maveeran Azhagu Muthukon

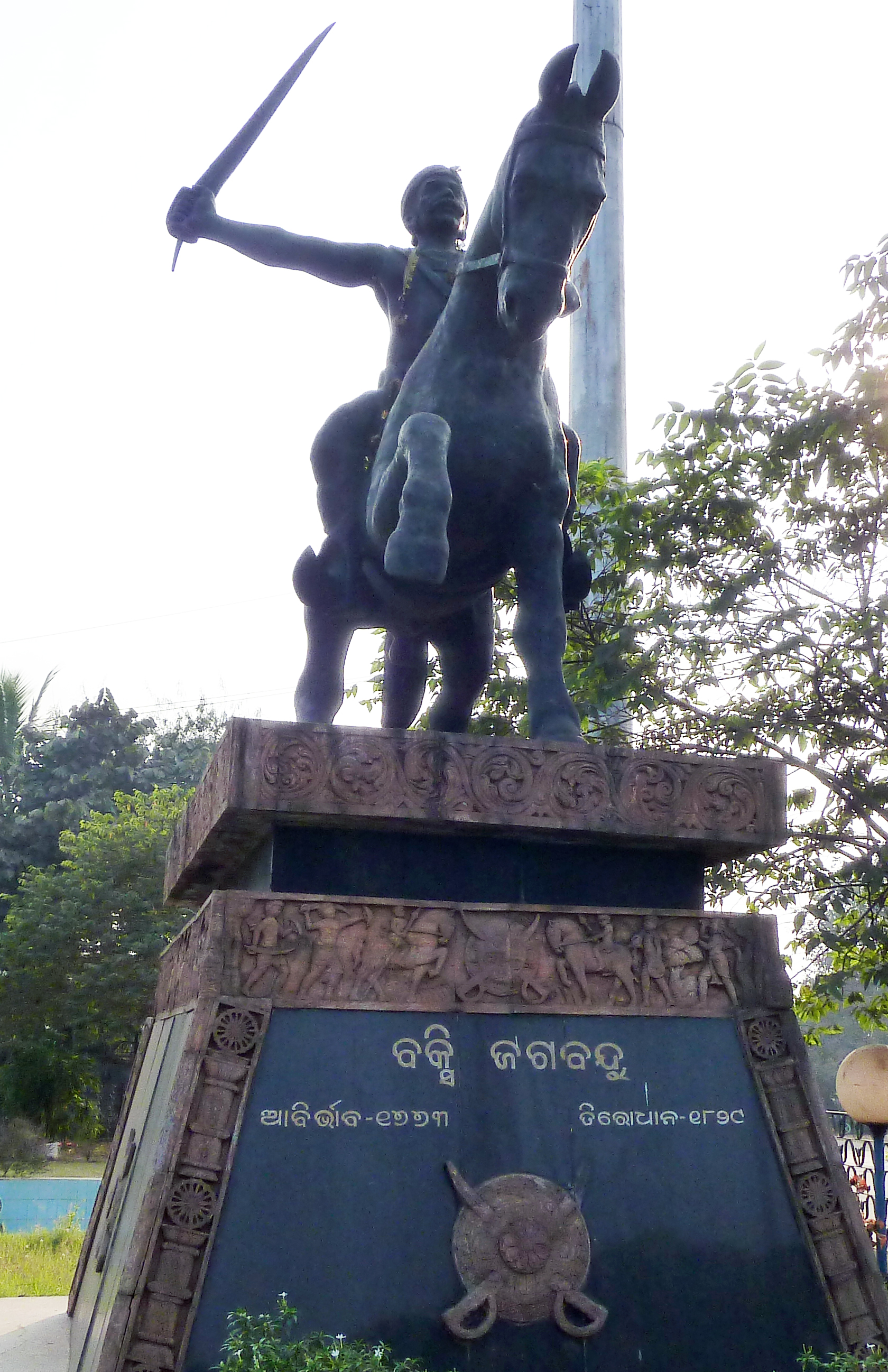
Statue of Bakshi Jagabandhu, the leader of Paika Rebellion

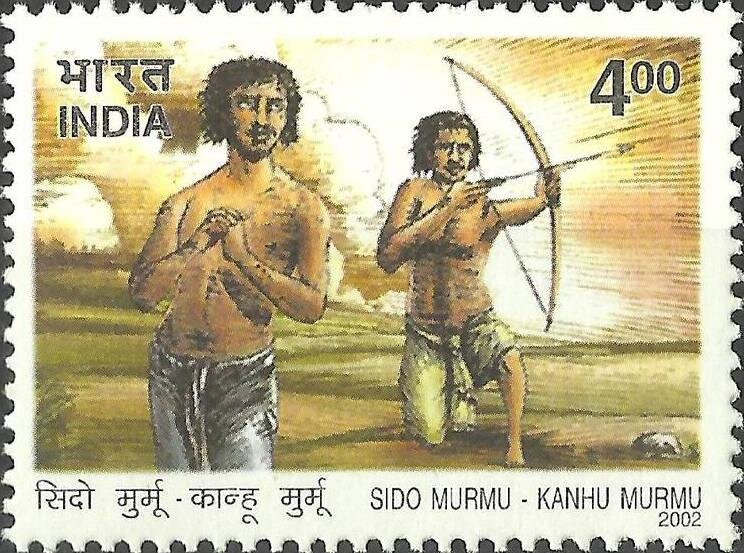
Sidhu and Kanhu Murmu, leaders of Santhal rebellion

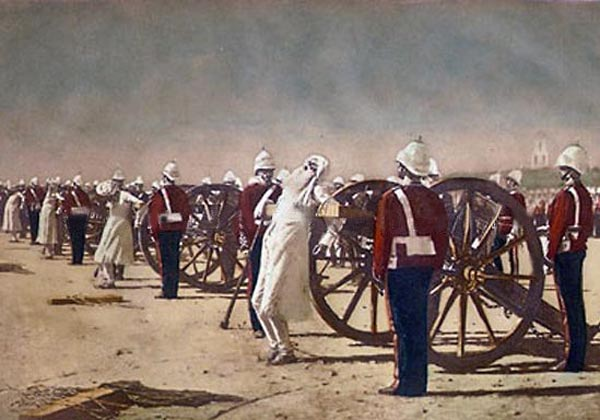
Suppression of the Indian Revolt by the English, which depicts the execution of mutineers by blowing from a gun by the British.

=== Rebellion of 1857 ===
The Indian war of independence of 1857 was a large uprising in northern and central India against the East India Company. The conditions of service in the company's army and cantonments had increasingly come into conflict with the religious beliefs and prejudices of the sepoys. The predominance of members from the upper castes in the army, perceived loss of caste due to overseas deployment, and rumours of secret designs of the government to convert them to Christianity led to growing discontent. The sepoys were also disillusioned by their low salaries and the racial discrimination practised by British officers in matters of promotion and privileges.

The indifference of the British towards native Indian rulers and the annexation of Oudh furthered dissent. The Marquess of Dalhousie's policy of annexation, the doctrine of lapse and the projected removal of the Mughals from their ancestral palace at Red Fort also led to popular anger.

Map of India during the Indian Rebellion of 1857.

The final spark was provided by the rumoured use of tallow (from cows) and lard (pig fat) in the newly introduced Pattern 1853 Enfield rifle cartridges. Soldiers had to bite the cartridges with their teeth before loading them into their rifles, ingesting the fat. This was sacrilegious to both Hindus and Muslims.

Mangal Pandey was sepoy who played a key part in the events immediately preceding the outbreak of the Indian rebellion of 1857. His defiance to his British superiors led to his execution, contributing to the first outbreak at Meerut.

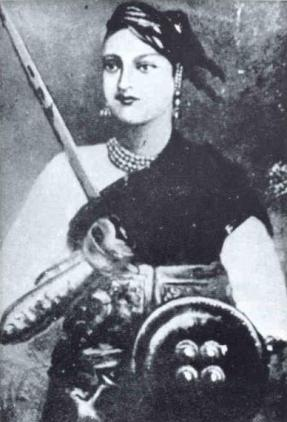
Lakshmibai, the Rani of Jhansi, one of the principal leaders of the rebellion who earlier had lost her kingdom as a result of the Doctrine of Lapse.

On 10 May 1857, the sepoys at Meerut broke ranks and turned on their commanding officers, killing some of them. They reached Delhi on 11 May, set the company's toll house on fire, and marched into the Red Fort, where they asked the Mughal emperor, Bahadur Shah II, to become their leader and reclaim his throne. The emperor eventually agreed and was proclaimed Shahenshah-e-Hindustan by the rebels. The rebels also murdered much of the European, Eurasian, and Christian population of the city, including natives who had converted to Christianity, while sparing British men and women who had converted to Islam.

Revolts broke out in other parts of Oudh and the North-Western Provinces as well, where civil rebellion followed the mutinies, leading to popular uprisings. The British were initially caught off-guard and were thus slow to react, but eventually responded with force. The lack of effective organisation among the rebels, coupled with the military superiority of the British, brought an end to the rebellion. The British fought the main army of the rebels near Delhi, and after prolonged fighting and a siege, defeated them and reclaimed the city on 20 September 1857. Subsequently, revolts in other centres were also crushed. The last significant battle was fought in Gwalior on 17 June 1858, during which Rani Lakshmibai was killed. Sporadic fighting and guerrilla warfare, led by Tatya Tope, continued until spring 1859, but most of the rebels were eventually subdued.

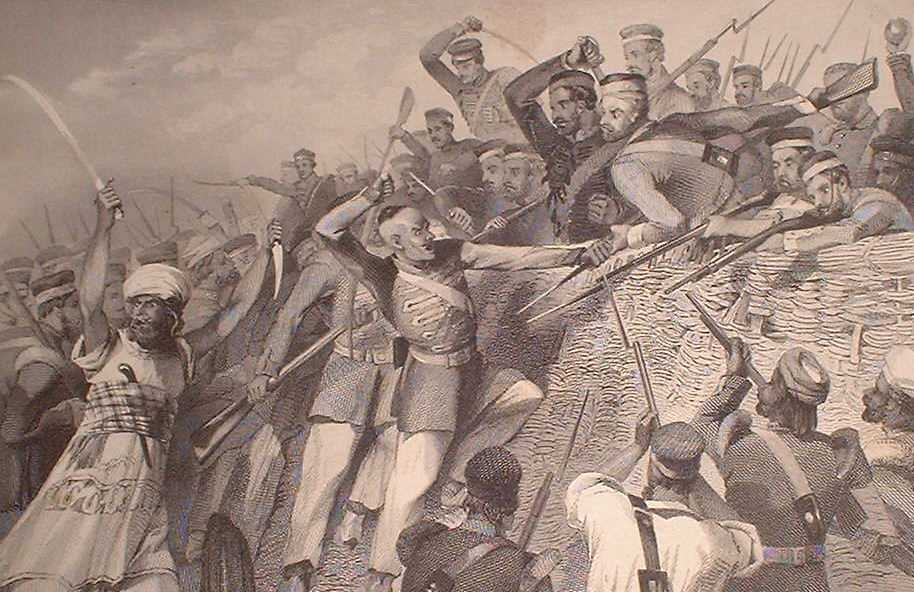
Attack of the Mutineers on the Redan Battery at Lucknow, 30 July 1857

The Indian Rebellion of 1857 was a turning point. While affirming the military and political power of the British, it led to a significant change in how India was to be controlled by them. Under the Government of India Act 1858, the East India Company's territory was transferred to the British government. At the apex of the new system was a Cabinet minister, the Secretary of State for India, who was to be formally advised by a statutory council; the Governor-General of India (Viceroy) was made responsible to him, while he in turn was responsible to the government.

In a royal proclamation made to the people of India, Queen Victoria promised equal opportunity of public service under British law, and also pledged to respect the rights of native princes. The British stopped the policy of seizing land from the princes, decreed religious tolerance and began to admit Indians into the civil service. However, they also increased the number of British soldiers in relation to native Indian ones, and allowed only British soldiers to handle artillery. Bahadur Shah II was exiled to Rangoon where he died in 1862.

In 1876 the British Prime Minister Benjamin Disraeli proclaimed Queen Victoria the Empress of India. The British Liberals objected as the title was foreign to British traditions.

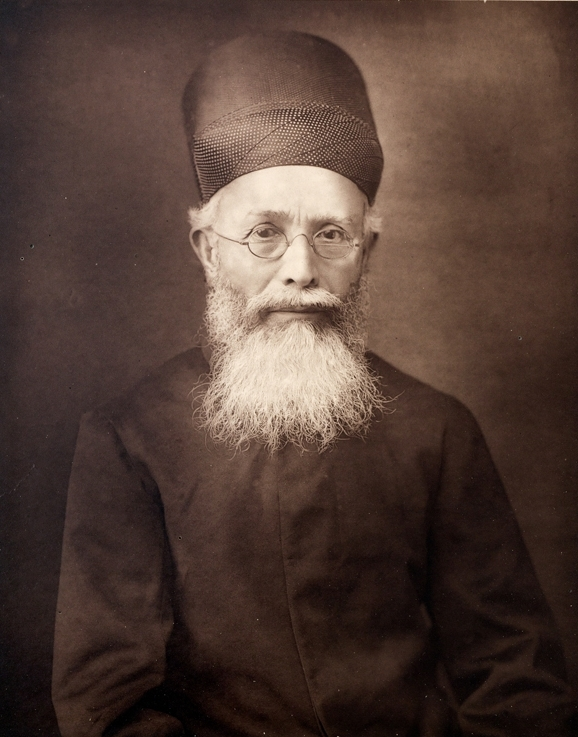
Dadabhai Naoroji, was one of the founding members of the Indian National Congress.

== Rise of organised movements ==
The decades following the Rebellion were a period of growing political awareness, the manifestation of Indian public opinion and the emergence of Indian leadership at both national and provincial levels. Dadabhai Naoroji formed the East India Association in 1866 and Surendranath Banerjee founded the Indian National Association in 1876. Inspired by a suggestion made by A.O. Hume, a retired Scottish civil servant, seventy-two Indian delegates met in Bombay in 1885 and founded the Indian National Congress. They were mostly members of the upwardly mobile and successful western-educated provincial elites, engaged in professions such as law, teaching and journalism. At its inception, Congress had no well-defined ideology and commanded few of the resources essential to a political organisation. Instead, it functioned more as a debating society that met annually to express its loyalty to the British and passed numerous resolutions on less controversial issues such as civil rights or opportunities in government (especially in the civil service). These resolutions were submitted to the Indian government and occasionally to the British Parliament, but the Congress's early gains were slight. "Despite its claim to represent all India, the Congress voiced the interests of urban elites; the number of participants from other social and economic backgrounds remained negligible. However, this period of history is still crucial because it represented the first political mobilisation of Indians, coming from all parts of the subcontinent and the first articulation of the idea of India as one nation, rather than a collection of independent princely states.

The first session of the Indian National Congress in 1885. The Congress was the first modern nationalist movement in the British Empire.

Religious groups played a role in reforming Indian society. These were of several religions from Hindu groups such as the Arya Samaj, the Brahmo Samaj, to other religions, such as the Namdhari (or Kuka) sect of Sikhism. The work of men like Swami Vivekananda, Ramakrishna, Sri Aurobindo, V. O. Chidambaram Pillai, Subramanya Bharathy, Bankim Chandra Chatterjee, Rabindranath Tagore and Dadabhai Naoroji, as well as women such as the Scots–Irish Sister Nivedita, spread the passion for rejuvenation and freedom. The rediscovery of India's indigenous history by several European and Indian scholars also fed into the rise of nationalism among Indians. The triumvirate also is known as Lal Bal Pal (Bal Gangadhar Tilak, Bipin Chandra Pal, Lala Lajpat Rai), along with V. O. Chidambaram Pillai, Sri Aurobindo, Surendranath Banerjee, and Rabindranath Tagore were some of the prominent leaders of movements in the early 20th century. The Swadeshi movement was the most successful. The name of Lokmanya began spreading around and people started following him in all parts of the country.

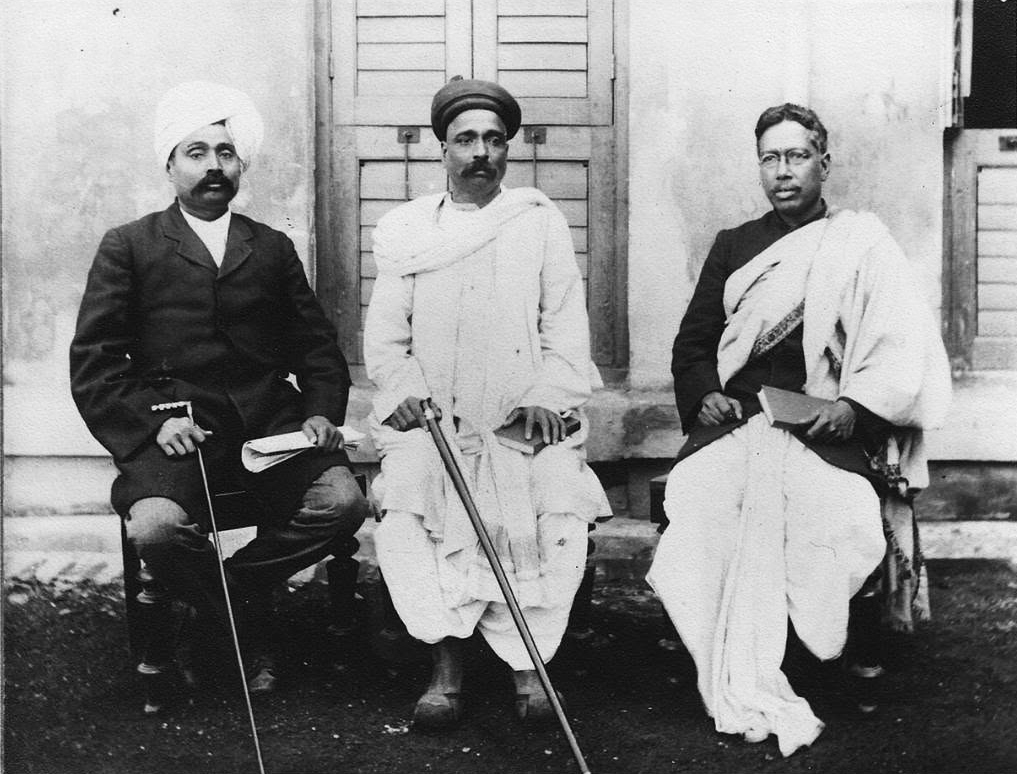
Lala Lajpat Rai of Punjab, Bal Gangadhar Tilak of Bombay, and Bipin Chandra Pal of Bengal, the triumvirate were popularly known as Lal Bal Pal, changed the political discourse of the Indian independence movement.

The Indian textile industry also played an important role in the freedom struggle of India. The merchandise of the textile industry pioneered the Industrial Revolution in India and soon England was producing cotton cloth in such great quantities that the domestic market was saturated, and the products had to be sold in foreign markets.

On the other hand, India was rich in cotton production and was in a position to supply British mills with the raw material they required. This was the time when India was under British rule and the East India Company had already established its roots in India. Raw materials were exported to England at very low rates while cotton cloth of refined quality was imported to India and sold at very high prices. This was draining India's economy, causing the textile industry of India to suffer greatly. This led to great resentment among cotton cultivators and traders.

After Lord Curzon announced the partition of Bengal in 1905, there was massive opposition from the people of Bengal. Initially, the partition plan was opposed through press campaign. The total follower of such techniques led to the boycott of British goods and the people of India pledged to use only swadeshi or Indian goods and to wear only Indian cloth. Imported garments were viewed with hate. At many places, public burnings of foreign cloth were organised. Shops selling foreign cloths were closed. The cotton textile industry is rightly described as the Swadeshi industry. The period witnessed the growth of swadeshi textile mills. Swadeshi factories came into existence everywhere.

According to Surendranath Banerji, the Swadeshi movement changed the entire texture of Indian social and domestic life. The songs composed by Rabindranath Tagore, Rajanikanta Sen and Syed Abu Mohd became the moving spirit for the nationalists. The movement soon spread to the rest of the country and the partition of Bengal had to be firmly inhaled on the first of April 1912.

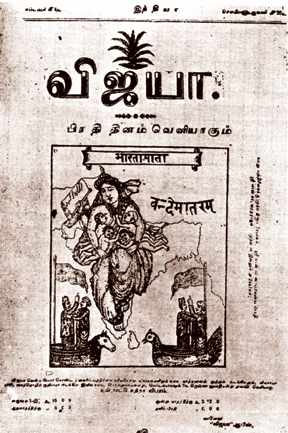
Cover of a 1909 issue of the Tamil magazine Vijaya showing "Mother India" (Bharat Mata) with her diverse progeny and the rallying cry "Vande Mataram".

== Rise of Indian nationalism ==
By 1900, although the Congress had emerged as an all-India political organisation, it did not have the support of most Indian Muslims. Attacks by Hindu reformers against religious conversion, cow slaughter, and the preservation of Urdu in Arabic script deepened their concerns of minority status and denial of rights if the Congress alone were to represent the people of India. Sir Syed Ahmed Khan launched a movement for Muslim regeneration that culminated in the founding in 1875 of the Muhammadan Anglo-Oriental College at Aligarh, Uttar Pradesh (renamed Aligarh Muslim University in 1920). Its objective was to educate students by emphasising the compatibility of Islam with modern western knowledge. The diversity among India's Muslims, however, made it impossible to bring about uniform cultural and intellectual regeneration.

The Hindu faction of the Independence movement was led by Nationalist leader Lokmanya Tilak, who was regarded as the "father of Indian Unrest" by the British. Along with Tilak were leaders like Gopal Krishna Gokhale, who was the inspiration, political mentor and role model of Mahatma Gandhi and inspired several other freedom activists.

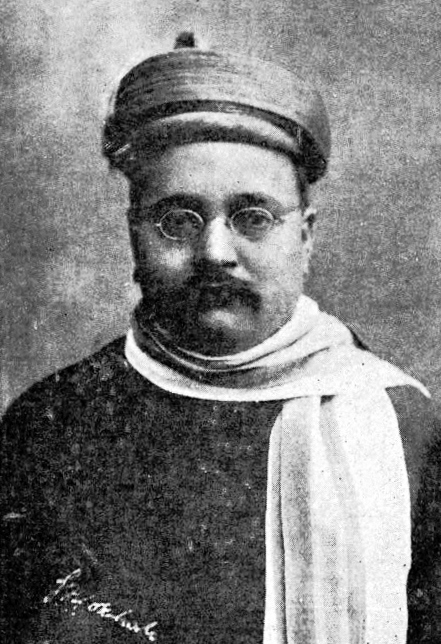
Gopal Krishna Gokhale, was one of the most senior leader of the Indian National Congress and the founder of the Servants of India Society.

Nationalistic sentiments among Congress members led to a push to be represented in the bodies of government, as well as to have a say in the legislation and administration of India. Congressmen saw themselves as loyalists, but wanted an active role in governing their own country, albeit as part of the Empire. This trend was personified by Dadabhai Naoroji, who went as far as contesting, successfully, an election to the House of Commons of the United Kingdom, becoming its first Indian member.

Dadabhai Naoroji was the first Indian nationalist to embrace Swaraj as the destiny of the nation. Bal Gangadhar Tilak deeply opposed a British education system that ignored and defamed India's culture, history, and values. He resented the denial of freedom of expression for nationalists, and the lack of any voice or role for ordinary Indians in the affairs of their nation. For these reasons, he considered Swaraj as the natural and only solution. His popular sentence "Swaraj is my birthright, and I shall have it" became the source of inspiration for Indians.

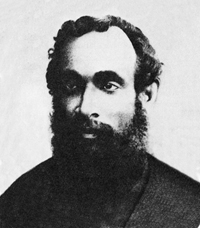
Surendranath Banerjee, founded the Indian National Association and founding members of the Indian National Congress.

In 1907, Congress was split into two factions: The radicals, led by Tilak, advocated civil agitation and direct revolution to overthrow the British Empire and the abandonment of all British goods. This movement gained traction and huge following of the masses in the western and eastern parts of India. The moderates, led by leaders like Dadabhai Naoroji and Gopal Krishna Gokhale, on the other hand, wanted reform within the framework of British rule. Tilak was backed by rising public leaders like Bipin Chandra Pal and Lala Lajpat Rai, who held the same point of view. Under them, India's three great states – Maharashtra, Bengal and Punjab shaped the demand of the people and India's nationalism. Gokhale criticised Tilak for encouraging acts of violence and armed resistance. But the Congress of 1906 did not have public membership, and thus Tilak and his supporters were forced to leave the party.

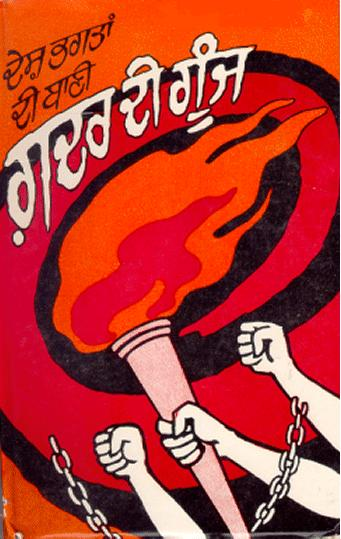
Ghadar di Gunj, was Ghadar Party literature produced in the early stages of the movement. A compilation of nationalist literature, it was banned in India in 1913.

But with Tilak's arrest, all hopes for an Indian offensive were stalled. The Indian National Congress lost credibility with the people. A Muslim deputation met with the Viceroy, Minto (1905–10), seeking concessions from the impending constitutional reforms, including special considerations in government service and electorates. The British recognised some of the Muslim League's petitions by increasing the number of elective offices reserved for Muslims in the Indian Councils Act 1909. The Muslim League insisted on its separateness from the Hindu-dominated Congress, as the voice of a "nation within a nation".

The Ghadar Party was formed overseas in 1913 to fight for the Independence of India with members coming from the United States and Canada, as well as Shanghai, Hong Kong, and Singapore. Members of the party aimed for Hindu, Sikh, and Muslim unity against the British.

In colonial India, the All India Conference of Indian Christians (AICIC), which was founded in 1914, played a role in the Indian independence movement, advocating for swaraj and opposing the partition of India. The AICIC also was opposed to separate electorates for Christians, believing that the faithful "should participate as common citizens in the one common, national political system". The All India Conference of Indian Christians and the All India Catholic Union formed a working committee with M. Rahnasamy of Andhra University serving as president and B.L. Rallia Ram of Lahore serving as general secretary. In its meeting on 16 and 17 April 1947, the joint committee prepared a 13-point memorandum that was sent to the Constituent Assembly of India, which asked for religious freedom for both organisations and individuals; this came to be reflected in the Constitution of India.

The temperance movement in India became aligned with Indian nationalism under the direction of Mahatma Gandhi, who saw alcohol as a foreign importation to the culture of the subcontinent.

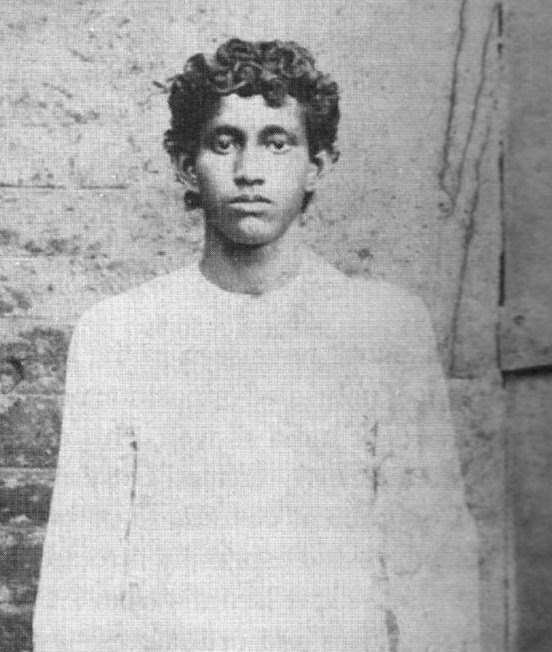
Khudiram Bose was one of the youngest Indian revolutionaries tried and executed by the British.

== Movements ==
=== Partition of Bengal, 1905 ===
In July 1905, Lord Curzon, the Viceroy and Governor-General (1899–1905), ordered the partition of the province of Bengal. The stated aim was to improve administration. However, this was seen as an attempt to quench nationalistic sentiment through divide and rule. The Bengali Hindu intelligentsia exerted considerable influence on local and national politics. The partition outraged Bengalis. Widespread agitation ensued in the streets and in the press, and the Congress advocated boycotting British products under the banner of swadeshi, or indigenous industries. A growing movement emerged, focussing on indigenous Indian industries, finance, and education, which saw the founding of National Council of Education, the birth of Indian financial institutions and banks, as well as an interest in Indian culture and achievements in science and literature. Hindus showed unity by tying Rakhi on each other's wrists and observing Arandhan (not cooking any food). During this time, Bengali Hindu nationalists like Sri Aurobindo, Bhupendranath Datta, and Bipin Chandra Pal began writing virulent newspaper articles challenging the legitimacy of British rule in India in publications such as Jugantar and Sandhya, and were charged with sedition.

The Partition also precipitated increasing activity from the then still Nascent militant nationalist revolutionary movement, which was particularly gaining strength in Bengal and Maharashtra from the last decade of the 1800s. In Bengal, Anushilan Samiti, led by brothers Aurobindo and Barin Ghosh organised several attacks of figureheads of the Raj, culminating in the attempt on the life of a British judge in Muzaffarpur. This precipitated the Alipore bomb case, whilst several revolutionaries were killed, or captured and put on trial. Revolutionaries like Khudiram Bose, Prafulla Chaki, Kanailal Dutt who were either killed or hanged became household names.

The British newspaper, The Empire, wrote:

"Khudiram Bose was executed this morning;... it is alleged that he mounted the scaffold with his body erect. He was cheerful and smiling."

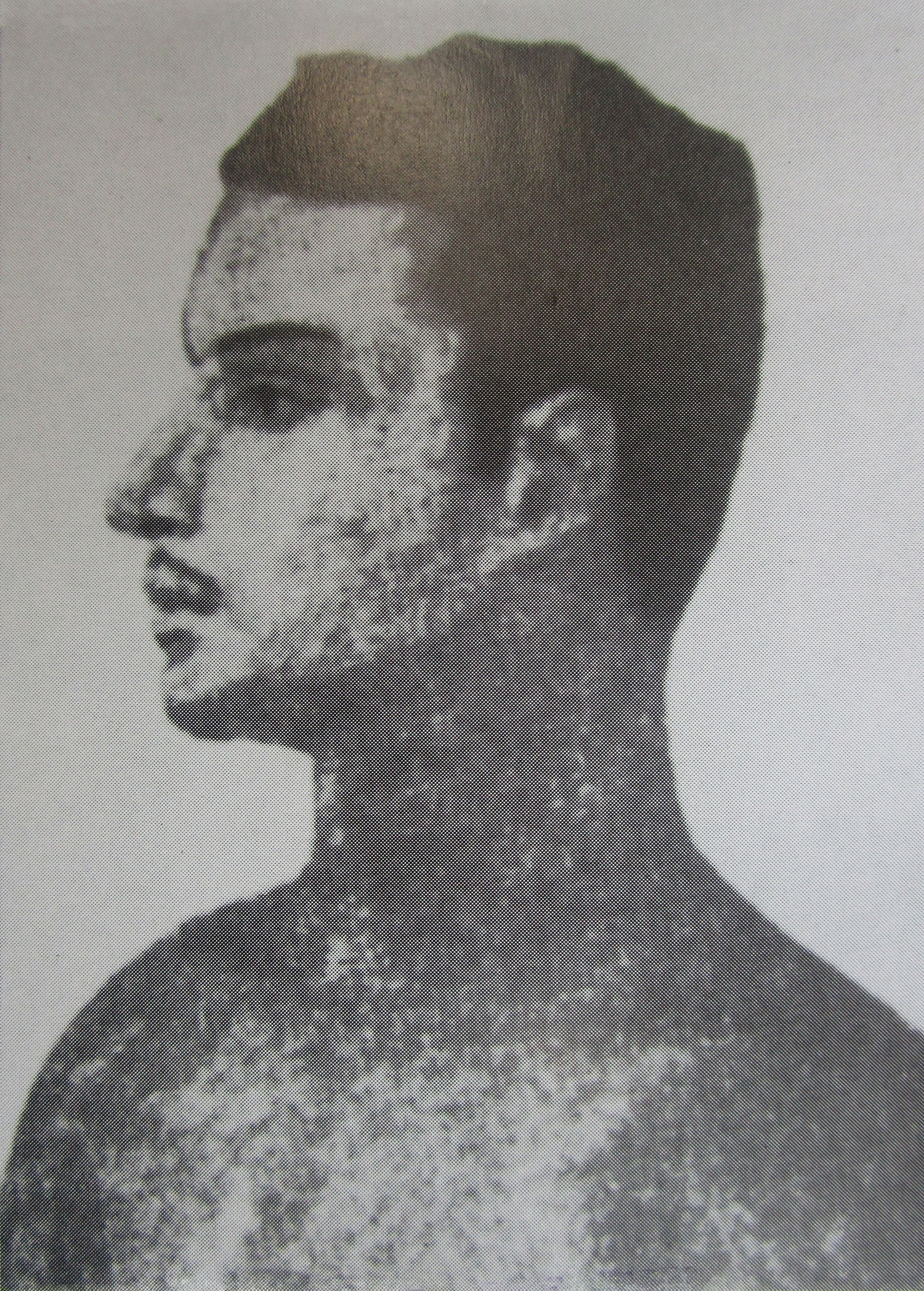
Prafulla Chaki was associated with the Jugantar. He carried out assassinations against British colonial officials in an attempt to secure Indian independence.

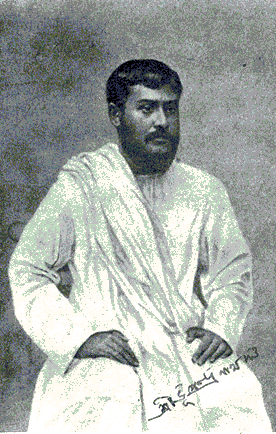
Bhupendranath Datta was an Indian revolutionary who was privy to the Indo-German Conspiracy.

=== Jugantar ===
Jugantar was a paramilitary organisation. Led by Barindra Ghosh, with 21 revolutionaries, including Bagha Jatin, started to collect arms and explosives and manufactured bombs.

Some senior members of the group were sent abroad for political and military training. One of them, Hemchandra Kanungo obtained his training in Paris. After returning to Kolkata he set up a combined religious school and bomb factory at a garden house in Maniktala suburb of Calcutta. However, the attempted murder of district Judge Kingsford of Muzaffarpur by Khudiram Bose and Prafulla Chaki (30 April 1908) initiated a police investigation that led to the arrest of many of the revolutionaries.

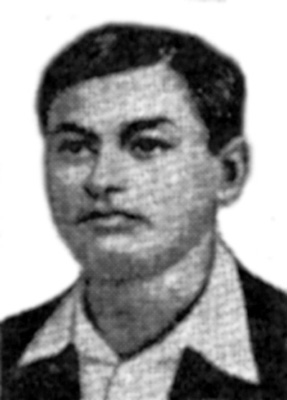
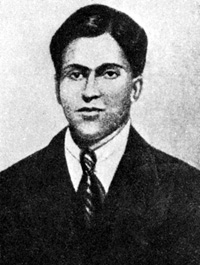
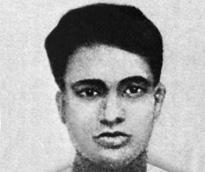
Benoy Basu, Badal Gupta, and Dinesh Gupta were noted for launching an attack on the Secretariat Building – the Writers' Building in the Dalhousie square in Kolkata.

Bagha Jatin was one of the senior leaders in Jugantar. He was arrested, along with several other leaders, in connection with the Howrah-Sibpur Conspiracy case. They were tried for treason, the charge being that they had incited various regiments of the army against the ruler.

=== Alipore bomb conspiracy case ===
Several leaders of the Jugantar party including Aurobindo Ghosh were arrested in connection with bomb-making activities in Kolkata. Several of the activists were deported to the Andaman Cellular Jail.

=== Delhi-Lahore conspiracy case ===
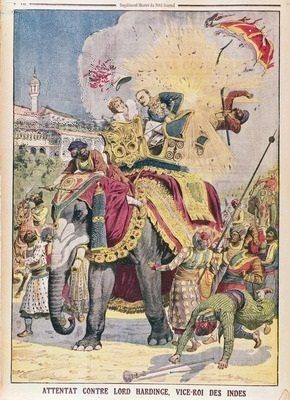
1912 assassination attempt on Lord Hardinge.

The Delhi-Lahore Conspiracy, hatched in 1912, planned to assassinate the then Viceroy of India, Lord Hardinge, on the occasion of transferring the capital of British India from Calcutta to New Delhi. Involving revolutionary underground in Bengal and headed by Rash Behari Bose along with Sachin Sanyal, the conspiracy culminated on the attempted assassination on 23 December 1912, when the ceremonial procession moved through the Chandni Chowk suburb of Delhi. The Viceroy escaped with his injuries, along with Lady Hardinge, although the Mahout was killed.

The investigations in the aftermath of the assassination attempt led to the Delhi Conspiracy trial. Basant Kumar Biswas was convicted of having thrown the bomb and executed, along with Amir Chand Bombwal and Avadh Behari for their roles in the conspiracy.

=== Howrah gang case ===
Most of the eminent Jugantar leaders including Bagha Jatin alias Jatindra Nath Mukherjee who were not arrested earlier, were arrested in 1910, in connection with the murder of Shamsul Alam. Thanks to Bagha Jatin's new policy of a decentralised federated action, most of the accused were released in 1911.

== All India Muslim League ==
The All-India Muslim League was founded by the All India Muhammadan Educational Conference at Dacca (now Dhaka, Bangladesh), in 1906. Being a political party to secure the interests of the Muslim in British India, the Muslim League played a decisive role behind the creation of Pakistan in the Indian subcontinent.

In 1916, Muhammad Ali Jinnah joined the Indian National Congress, which was the largest Indian political organisation. Like most of the Congress at the time, Jinnah did not favour outright self-rule, considering British influences on education, law, culture, and industry as beneficial to India. Jinnah became a member of the sixty-member Imperial Legislative Council. The council had no real power or authority, and included a large number of unelected pro-Raj loyalists and Europeans. Nevertheless, Jinnah was instrumental in the passing of the Child Marriages Restraint Act, the legitimisation of the Muslim waqf (religious endowments) and was appointed to the Sandhurst committee, which helped establish the Indian Military Academy at Dehradun. During the First World War, Jinnah joined other Indian moderates in supporting the British war effort.

== First World War ==
The initial response throughout India to Lord Hardinge's announcement was, for the most part, enthusiastic support. Indian princes volunteered their men, money, and personal service. Support from the Congress Party was primarily offered on the hopes that Britain would repay such loyal assistance with substantial political concessions—if not immediate independence or at least dominion status following the war, then surely its promise soon after the Allies achieved victory. Contrary to initial British fears of an Indian revolt, Indians contributed considerably to the British war effort by providing men and resources. About 1.3 million Indian soldiers and labourers served in Europe, Africa, and the Middle East, while both the Indian government and the princes sent large supplies of food, money, and ammunition. The major threat for the British Government in South Asia came from the armed tribes in North Western frontier and Afghanistan. The source of the second potential threat for the colonial government was the Indian Muslims whom the British believed shall sympathise with the Ottoman Empire. Nationalism in Bengal, increasingly associated with the unrest in Punjab, was of significant ferocity to almost complete the paralysis of the regional administration. Meanwhile, failed conspiracies were triggered by revolutionaries lack of preparedness to organise a nationalist revolt.

None of the revolutionary conspiracies made a significant impact inside India. The prospect that subversive violence would affect a popular war effort drew support from the Indian population for special measures against anti-colonial activities in the form of Defence of India Act 1915. No major mutinies were occurring during wartime, yet conspiracies exacerbated profound fears of insurrection among British officials, preparing them to use extreme force to frighten Indians into submission.

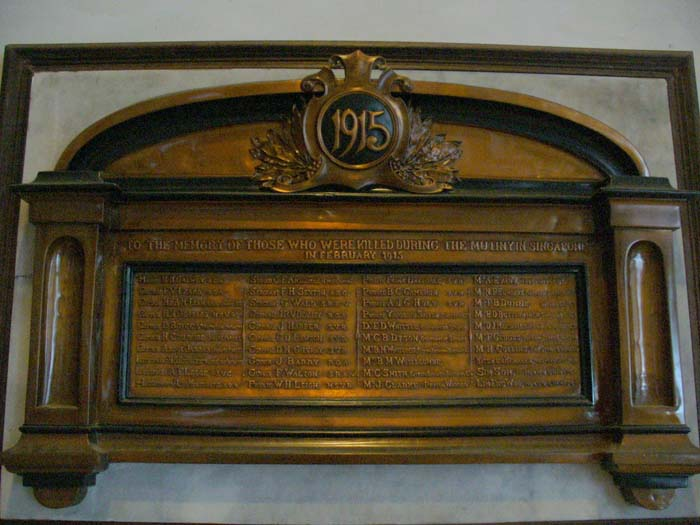
The 1915 Singapore Mutiny memorial tablet at the entrance of the Victoria Memorial Hall, Singapore.

=== Hindu–German Conspiracy ===
The Hindu–German Conspiracy, was a series of plans between 1914 and 1917 by Indian nationalist groups to attempt Pan-Indian rebellion against the British Raj during World War I, formulated between the Indian revolutionary underground and exiled or self-exiled nationalists who formed, in the United States, the Ghadar Party, and in Germany, the Indian independence committee, in the decade preceding the Great War. The conspiracy was drawn up at the beginning of the war, with extensive support from the German Foreign Office, the German consulate in San Francisco, as well as some support from Ottoman Turkey and the Irish republican movement. The most prominent plan attempted to foment unrest and trigger a Pan-Indian mutiny in the British Indian Army from Punjab to Singapore. This plot was planned to be executed in February 1915 to overthrow British rule over the Indian subcontinent. The February mutiny was ultimately thwarted when British intelligence infiltrated the Ghadarite movement and arrested key figures. Mutinies in smaller units and garrisons within India were also crushed.

Other related events include the 1915 Singapore Mutiny, the Annie Larsen arms plot, the Jugantar–German plot, the German mission to Kabul, the mutiny of the Connaught Rangers in India, as well as, by some accounts, the Black Tom explosion in 1916. Parts of the conspiracy included efforts to subvert the British Indian Army in the Middle Eastern theatre of World War I.

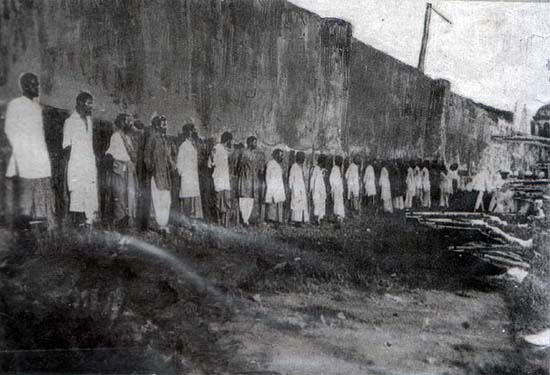
The public executions of convicted sepoy mutineers of the 1915 Singapore Mutiny at Outram Road, Singapore.

=== Ghadar Mutiny ===
The Ghadar Mutiny was a plan to initiate a pan-Indian mutiny in the British Indian Army in February 1915 to end the British Raj in India. The plot originated at the onset of World War I, between the Ghadar Party in the United States, the Berlin Committee in Germany, the Indian revolutionary underground in British India and the German Foreign Office through the consulate in San Francisco. The incident derives its name from the North American Ghadar Party, whose members of the Punjabi Sikh community in Canada and the United States were among the most prominent participants in the plan. It was the most prominent amongst several plans of the much larger Hindu–German Mutiny, formulated between 1914 and 1917 to initiate a Pan-Indian rebellion against the British Raj during World War I. The mutiny was planned to start in the key state of Punjab, followed by mutinies in Bengal and rest of India. Indian units as far as Singapore were planned to participate in the rebellion. The plans were thwarted through a coordinated intelligence and police response. British intelligence infiltrated the Ghadarite movement in Canada and in India, and last-minute intelligence from a spy helping to crush the planned uprising in Punjab before it started. Key figures were arrested, mutinies in smaller units and garrisons within India were also crushed.

Intelligence about the threat of the mutiny led to several important war-time measures introduced in India, including the passages of Ingress into India Ordinance, 1914, the Foreigners act 1914, and the Defence of India Act 1915. The conspiracy was followed by the First Lahore Conspiracy Trial and Benares Conspiracy Trial which saw death sentences awarded to several Indian revolutionaries, and exile to several others. After the end of the war, fear of a second Ghadarite uprising led to the recommendations of the Rowlatt Acts and thence the Jallianwala Bagh massacre.

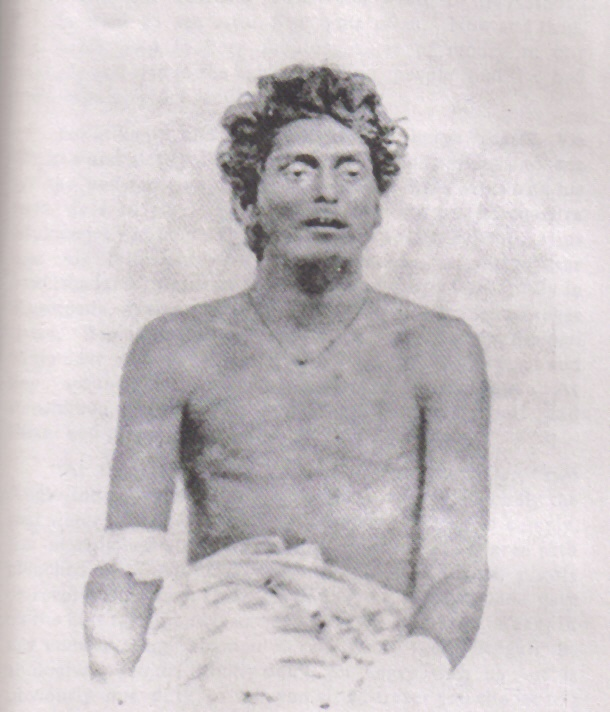
Bagha Jatin after the final battle, Balasore, 1915.

=== 1st Christmas Day and 2nd Christmas Day plot ===
The first Christmas Day plot was a conspiracy made by the Indian revolutionary movement in 1909: during the year-ending holidays, the Governor of Bengal organised at his residence a ball in the presence of the Viceroy, the Commander-in-Chief and all the high-ranking officers and officials of the Capital (Calcutta). The 10th Jat Regiment was in charge of the security. Indoctrinated by Jatindranath Mukherjee, its soldiers decided to blow up the ballroom and take advantage of destroying the colonial Government. In keeping with his predecessor Otto (William Oskarovich) von Klemm, a friend of Lokamanya Tilak, on 6 February 1910, M. Arsenyev, the Russian Consul-General, wrote to St Petersburg that it had been intended to "arouse in the country a general perturbation of minds and, thereby, afford the revolutionaries an opportunity to take the power in their hands." According to R. C. Majumdar, "The police had suspected nothing and it is hard to say what the outcome would have been had the soldiers not been betrayed by one of their comrades who informed the authorities about the impending coup".

The second Christmas Day plot was to initiate an insurrection in Bengal in British India during World War I with German arms and support. Scheduled for Christmas Day, 1915, the plan was conceived and led by the Jugantar group under the Bengali Indian revolutionary Jatindranath Mukherjee, to be coordinated with simultaneous uprising in the British colony of Burma and Kingdom of Siam under direction of the Ghadar Party, along with a German raid on the South Indian city of Madras and the British penal colony in Andaman Islands. The plot aimed to seize the Fort William, isolate Bengal and capture the capital city of Calcutta, which was then to be used as a staging ground for a pan-Indian revolution. The Christmas Day plot was one of the later plans for pan-Indian mutiny during the war that were coordinated between the Indian nationalist underground, the "Indian independence committee" set up by the Germans in Berlin, the Ghadar Party in North America, and the German Foreign office. The plot was ultimately thwarted after British intelligence uncovered the plot through German and Indian double agents in Europe and Southeast Asia.

Mahendra Pratap (centre), President of the Provisional Government of India, at the head of the Mission with the German and Turkish delegates in Kabul, 1915. Seated to his right is Werner Otto von Hentig.

=== Niedermayer–Hentig Expedition ===
The Niedermayer–Hentig Expedition was a diplomatic mission to Afghanistan sent by the Central Powers in 1915–1916. The purpose was to encourage Afghanistan to declare full independence from the British Empire, enter World War I on the side of the Central Powers, and attack British India. The expedition was part of the Hindu–German Conspiracy, a series of Indo-German efforts to provoke a nationalist revolution in India. Nominally headed by the exiled Indian prince Raja Mahendra Pratap, the expedition was a joint operation of Germany and Turkey and was led by the German Army officers Oskar Niedermayer and Werner Otto von Hentig. Other participants included members of an Indian nationalist organisation called the Berlin Committee, including Maulavi Barkatullah and Chempakaraman Pillai, while the Turks were represented by Kazim Bey, a close confidante of Enver Pasha.

Britain saw the expedition as a serious threat. Britain and its ally, the Russian Empire, unsuccessfully attempted to intercept it in Persia during the summer of 1915. Britain waged a covert intelligence and diplomatic offensive, including personal interventions by the Viceroy Lord Hardinge and King George V, to maintain Afghan neutrality.

The mission failed in its main task of rallying Afghanistan, under Emir Habibullah Khan, to the German and Turkish war effort, but it influenced other major events. In Afghanistan, the expedition triggered reforms and drove political turmoil that culminated in the assassination of the Emir in 1919, which in turn precipitated the Third Afghan War. It influenced the Kalmyk Project of nascent Bolshevik Russia to propagate socialist revolution in Asia, with one goal being the overthrow of the British Raj. Other consequences included the formation of the Rowlatt Committee to investigate sedition in India as influenced by Germany and Bolshevism, and changes in the Raj's approach to the Indian independence movement immediately after World War I.

=== Nationalist response to war ===
In the aftermath of the First World War, high casualty rates, soaring inflation compounded by heavy taxation, a widespread influenza pandemic and the disruption of trade during the war escalated human suffering in India.

The pre-war nationalist movement revived moderate and extremist groups within the Congress submerged their differences to stand together as a unified front. They argued that their enormous services to the British Empire during the war demanded a reward to demonstrate Indian capacity for self-rule. In 1916, Congress succeeded in forging the Lucknow Pact, a temporary alliance with the All India Muslim League over the issues of devolution and the future of Islam in the region.

=== British reforms ===
The British themselves adopted a "carrot and stick" approach in recognition of India's support during the war and in response to renewed nationalist demands. In August 1917, Edwin Montagu, Secretary of state for India, made an historic announcement in Parliament that the British policy was for: "increasing association of Indians in every branch of the administration and the gradual development of self-governing institutions with a view to the progressive realisation of responsible government in India as an integral part of the British Empire." The means of achieving the proposed measures were later enshrined in the Government of India Act, 1919, which introduced the principle of a dual-mode of administration, or diarchy, in which both elected Indian legislators and, appointed British officials shared power. The act also expanded the central and provincial legislatures and widened the franchise considerably. The diarchy set in motion certain real changes at the provincial level: several non-controversial or "transferred" portfolios, such as agriculture, local government, health, education, and public works, were handed over to Indians, while more sensitive matters such as finance, taxation, and maintaining law and order were retained by the provincial British administrators.

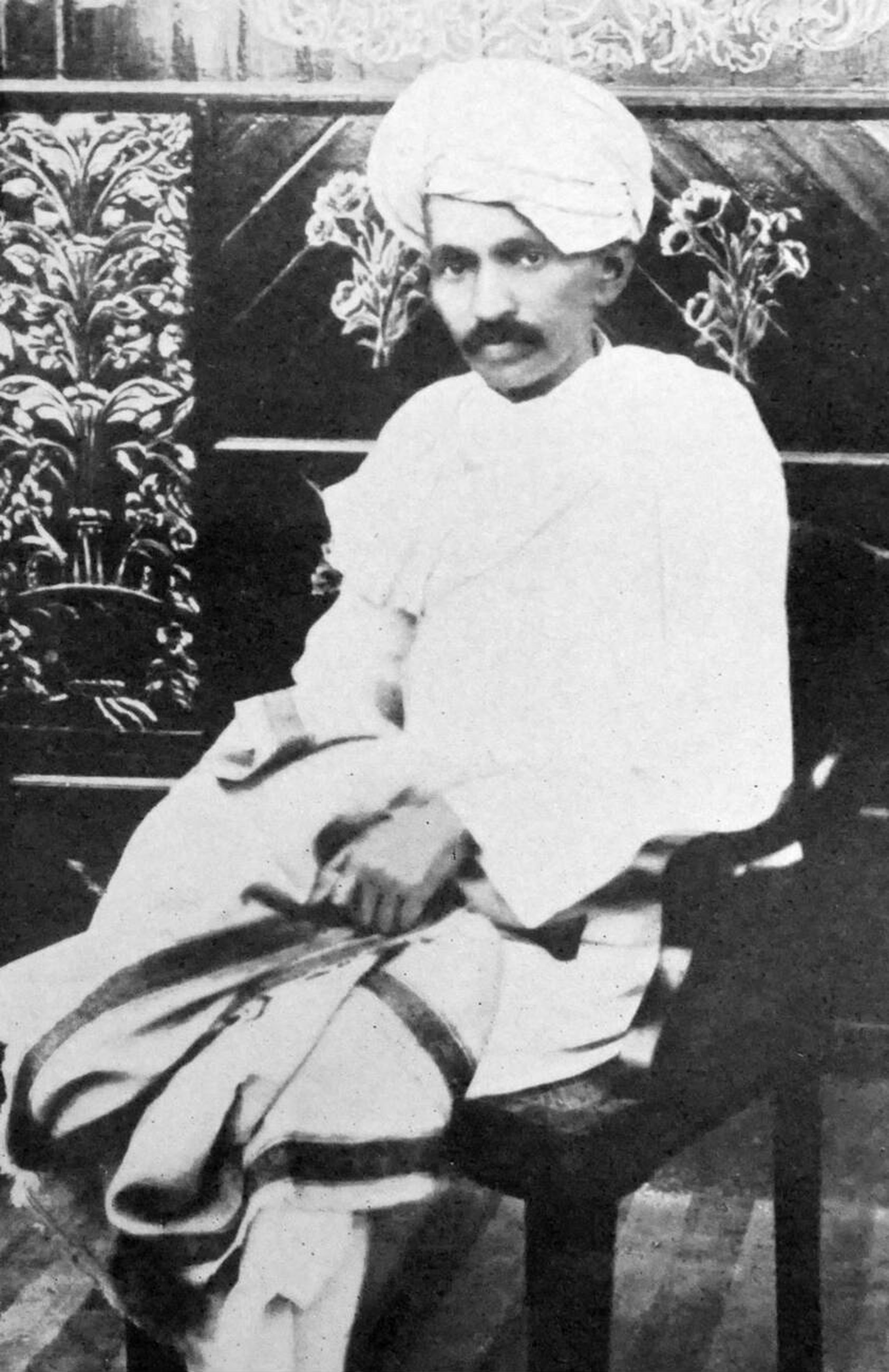
Gandhi in 1918, at the time of the Kheda Satyagraha and Champaran Satyagraha.

== Gandhi arrives in India ==
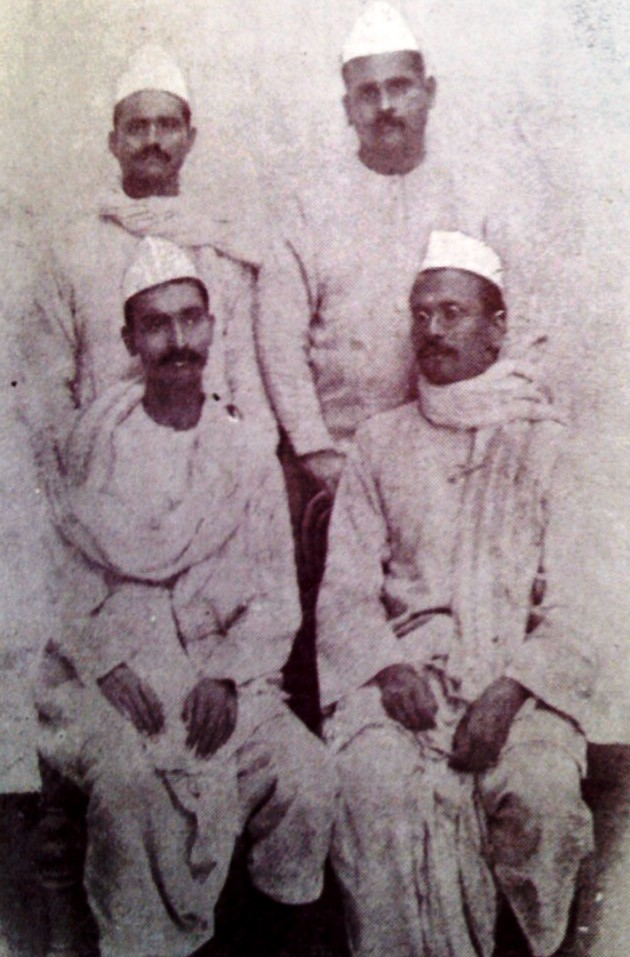
(Sitting L to R) Rajendra Prasad and Anugrah Narayan Sinha during Mahatma Gandhi's 1917 Champaran Satyagraha.

Gandhi had been a leader of the Indian nationalist movement in South Africa. He had also been a vocal opponent of basic discrimination and abusive labour treatment as well as suppressive police control such as the Rowlatt Acts. During these protests, Gandhi had perfected the concept of satyagraha. In January 1914 (well before the First World War began) Gandhi was successful. The legislation against Indians was repealed and all Indian political prisoners were released by General Jan Smuts. Gandhi accomplished this through extensive use of non-violent protests, such as boycotting, protest marching, and fasting by him and his followers.

Gandhi returned to India on 9 January 1915, and initially entered the political fray not with calls for a nation-state, but in support of the unified commerce-oriented territory that the Congress Party had been asking for. Gandhi believed that the industrial development and educational development that the Europeans had brought were long required to alleviate many of India's chronic problems. Gopal Krishna Gokhale, a veteran Congressman and Indian leader, became Gandhi's mentor. Gandhi's ideas and strategies of non-violent civil disobedience initially appeared impractical to some Indians and their Congress leaders. In the Mahatma's own words, "civil disobedience is civil breach of immoral statutory enactments." It had to be carried out non-violently by withdrawing co-operation with the corrupt state. Gandhi had great respect for Lokmanya Tilak. His programmes were all inspired by Tilak's "Chatusutri" programme.

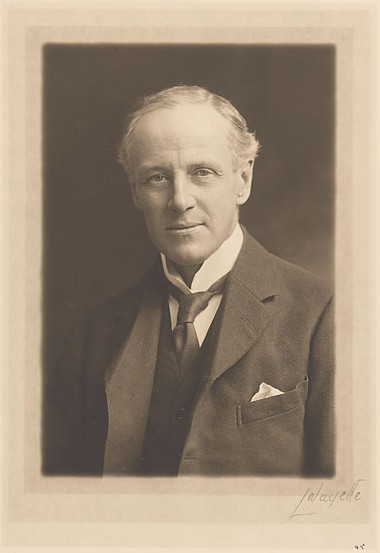
Sidney Rowlatt, best remembered for his controversial presidency of the Rowlatt Committee, a sedition committee appointed in 1918 by the British Indian Government to evaluate the links between political terrorism in India. The actions indirectly led to the infamous Jallianwala Bagh massacre of 1919.

The positive impact of reform was seriously undermined in 1919 by the Rowlatt Act, named after the recommendations made the previous year to the Imperial Legislative Council by the Rowlatt Committee. The commission was set up to look into the war-time conspiracies by the nationalist organisations and recommend measures to deal with the problem in the post-war period. Rowlatt recommended the extension of the war-time powers of the Defence of India act into the post-war period. The war-time act had vested the Viceroy's government with extraordinary powers to quell sedition by silencing the press, detaining political activists without trial, and arresting any individuals suspected of sedition or treason without a warrant. It was increasingly reviled within India due to widespread and indiscriminate use. Many popular leaders, including Annie Besant and Ali brothers had been detained. The Rowlatt Act was, therefore, passed in the face of universal opposition among the (non-official) Indian members in the Viceroy's council. The extension of the act drew widespread critical opposition. A nationwide cessation of work (hartal) was called, marking the beginning of widespread, although not nationwide, popular discontent.

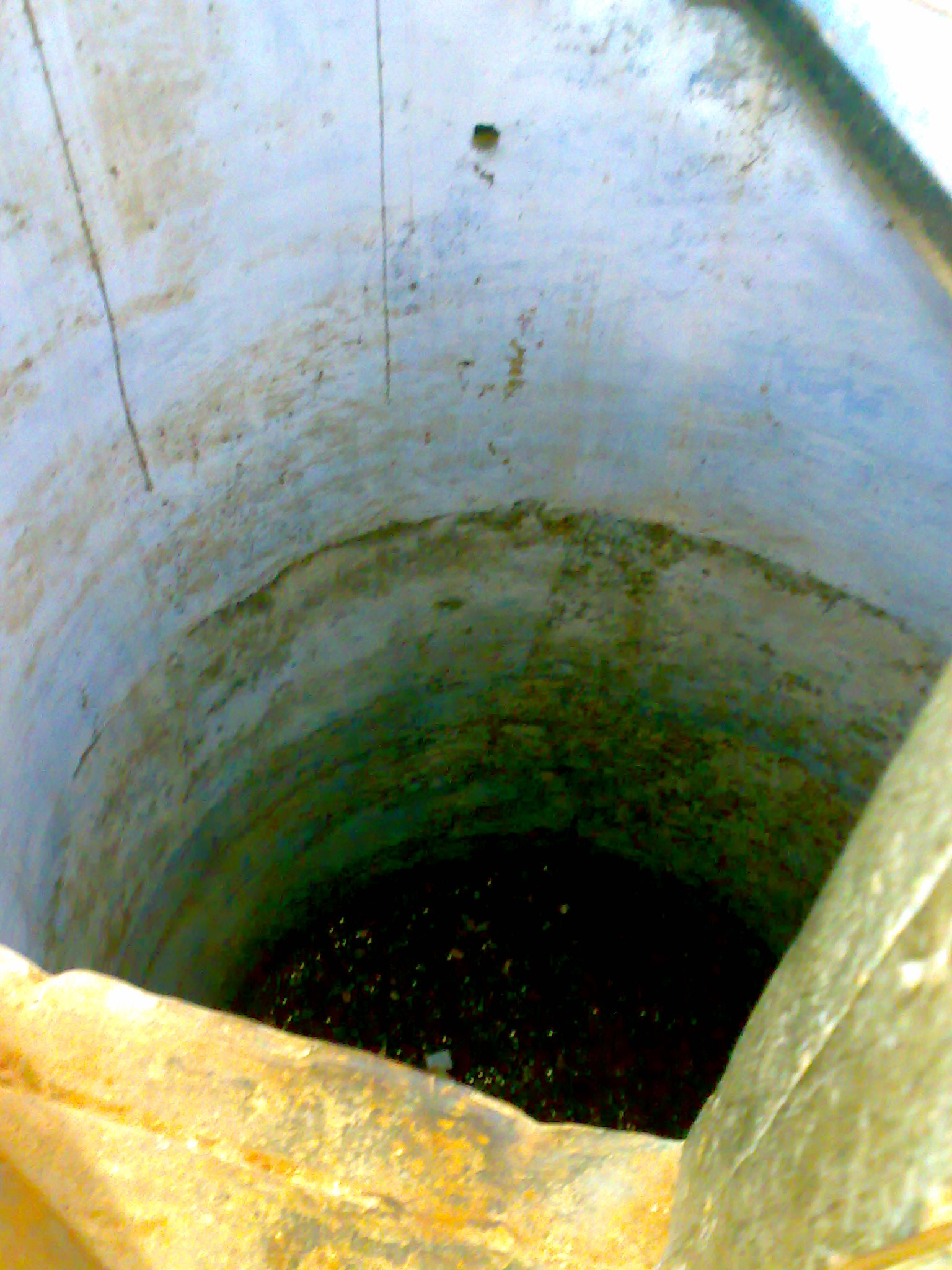
The Martyrs' Well of Jallianwala Bagh massacre, at Jallianwala Bagh. 120 bodies were recovered from this well as per inscription on it.

The agitation unleashed by the acts led to demonstrations and British repressions, culminating on 13 April 1919, in the Jallianwala Bagh massacre (also known as the Amritsar Massacre) in Amritsar, Punjab. In response to agitation in Amritsar, Brigadier-General Reginald Dyer blocked the main, and only entrance, and ordered troops under his command to fire into an unarmed and unsuspecting crowd of some 15,000 men, women, and children. They had assembled peacefully at Jallianwala Bagh, a walled courtyard, but Dyer had wanted to execute the imposed ban on all meetings and proposed to teach all protestors a lesson the harsher way. A total of 1,651 rounds were fired, killing 379 people (as according to an official British commission; Indian officials' estimates ranged as high as 1,499 and wounding 1,137 in the massacre.) Dyer was forced to retire but was hailed as a hero by some in Britain, demonstrating to Indian nationalists that the Empire was beholden to public opinion in Britain, but not in India. The episode dissolved wartime hopes of home rule and goodwill and opened a rift that could not be bridged short of complete self-rule.

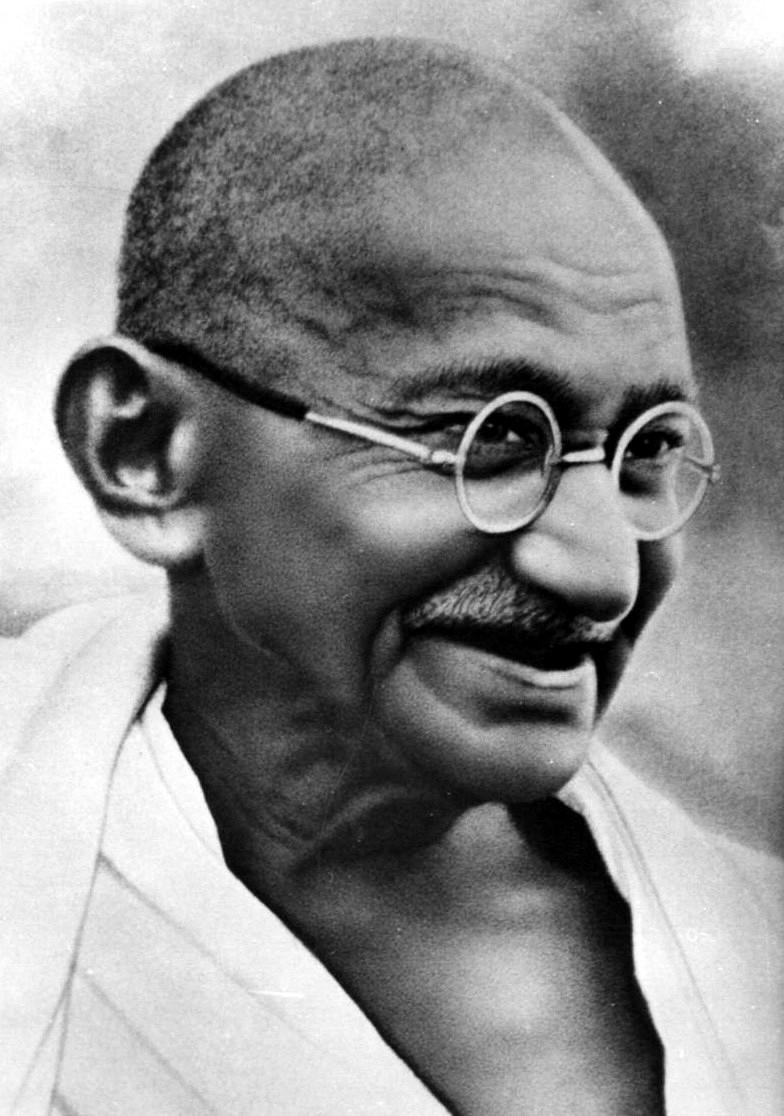
Mahatma Gandhi.

=== First non-cooperation movement ===
From 1920 to 1922, Gandhi started the Non-Cooperation Movement. At the Kolkata session of the Congress in September 1920, Gandhi convinced other leaders of the need to start a non-co-operation movement in support of Khilafat as well as for dominion status. The first satyagraha movement urged the use of khadi and Indian material as alternatives to those shipped from Britain. It also urged people to boycott British educational institutions and law courts, resign from government employment, refuse to pay taxes, and forsake British titles and honours. Although this came too late to influence the framing of the new Government of India Act 1919, the movement enjoyed widespread popular support, and the resulting unparalleled magnitude of disorder presented a serious challenge to foreign rule. However, Gandhi called off the movement after the Chauri Chaura incident, which saw the death of twenty-two policemen at the hands of an angry mob, out of concerns that India would descend into anarchy.

In 1920, under Gandhi's leadership, the Congress was reorganized and given a new constitution, whose goal was swaraj. Membership in the party was opened to anyone prepared to pay a token fee, and a hierarchy of committees was established and made responsible for discipline and control over a hitherto amorphous and diffuse movement. The party was transformed from an elite organisation to one of mass national appeal.

Gandhi was sentenced in 1922 to six years in prison, but was released after serving two. On his release from prison, he set up the Sabarmati Ashram in Ahmedabad. On the banks of the river Sabarmati, he established the newspaper Young India, introducing a series of reforms aimed at the socially disadvantaged within Hindu society — the rural poor, and the untouchables. This era saw the emergence of a new generation of Indians from within the Congress Party, including Maulana Azad, C. Rajagopalachari, Jawaharlal Nehru, Vallabhbhai Patel, Subhas Chandra Bose and others — who would, later on, come to form the most prominent voices of the Indian self-rule movement, whether keeping with Gandhian values, or, as in the case of Bose's Indian National Army, diverging from it.

The Indian political spectrum was further broadened in the mid-1920s by the emergence of both moderate and militant parties, such as the Swaraj Party, Hindu Mahasabha, Communist Party of India and the Rashtriya Swayamsevak Sangh. Regional political organisations also continued to represent the interests of non-Brahmins in Madras, Mahars in Maharashtra, and Sikhs in Punjab. However, people like Mahakavi Subramanya Bharathi, Vanchinathan, and Neelakanda Brahmachari played a major role from Tamil Nadu in both self-rule struggle and fighting for equality for all castes and communities. Many women participated in the movement, including Kasturba Gandhi (Gandhi's wife), Rajkumari Amrit Kaur, Muthulaxmi Reddy, Aruna Asaf Ali, and many others.

Gandhi leading the famous 1930 Salt March, a notable example of satyagraha.

=== Result of movements by Gandhi ===
The mass movements sparked nationalist sentiment with the Indian populace and figures like Mahatma Gandhi united a nation behind his non-violence movement; philosophy and undoubtedly put crucial pressure on the British occupation. The movements failed in their primary objective, achieving independence for India, as they were often called off before they naturally concluded due to laws and punishment. While in the later years of the Raj economic factors like the reversing trade fortunes between Britain and India and the cost of fielding the Indian armed forces abroad lumped on the British taxpayer by the 1935 Government of India act, had mounting implications for British administration, united resistance further drew light on the growing disparity of the British failures to achieve solidarity over India.

On 14 July 1942 the Congress Working Committee (executive committee of Indian National Congress), whose president Abul Kalam Azad supported Gandhi, passed a resolution demanding complete independence from the British government, and proposed massive civil disobedience if the British did not accede to the demands. On 8 August 1942 the Quit India Movement (Bharat Chhodo Andolan) began, a civil disobedience movement in India in response to Mahatma Gandhi's call for immediate self-rule by Indians and against sending Indians to World War II. Other major parties rejected the Quit India plan, and most cooperated closely with the British, as did the princely states, the civil service, and the police. The Muslim League supported the Raj and grew rapidly in membership, and in influence with the British.

The British swiftly responded to the Quit India Movement with mass arrests. Over 100,000 arrests were made, massive fines were levied, and demonstrators were subjected to public flogging. Hundreds of civilians were killed in violence many shot by the police army. Tens of thousands of leaders were also arrested and imprisoned until 1945. Ultimately, the British government realised that India was ungovernable in the long run, and the question for the postwar era became how to exit gracefully and peacefully.

== Purna Swaraj ==
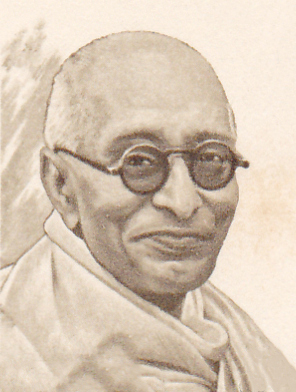
C. Rajagopalachari, was an Indian nationalist who participated in the agitations against the Rowlatt Act, joining the Non-cooperation movement, the Vaikom Satyagraha, and the Civil disobedience movement.

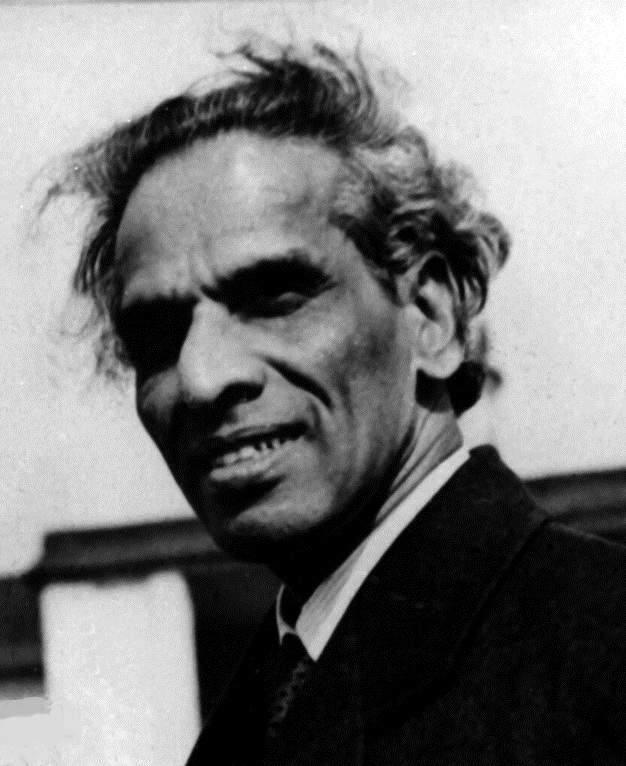
V. K. Krishna Menon in 1928 founded India League in London and demanded total independence from the British rule.

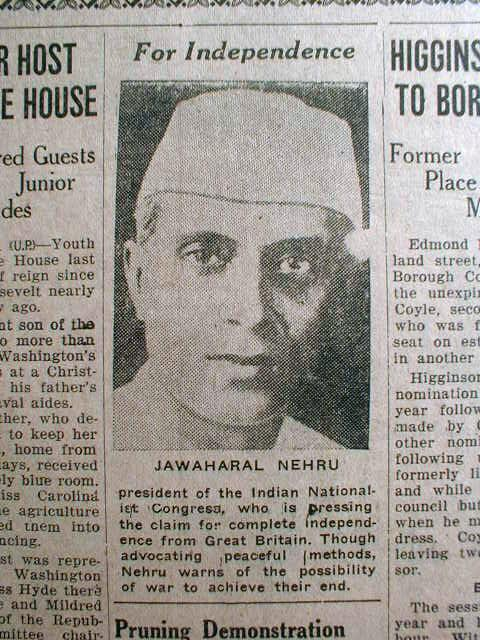
Jawaharlal Nehru in 1929 demanded "complete independence from Great Britain."

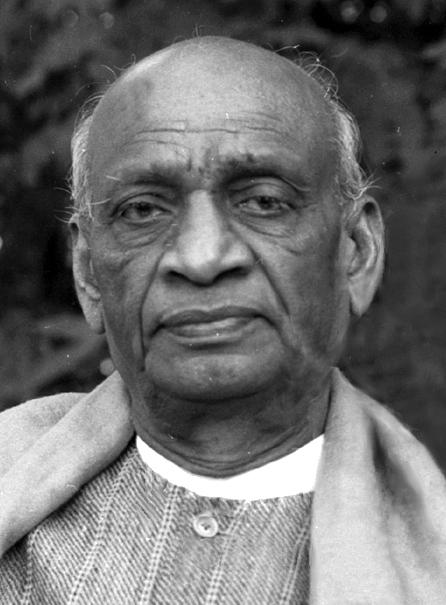
Vallabhbhai Patel was appointed as the 49th president of Indian National Congress, organising the party for elections in 1934 and 1937 while promoting the Quit India Movement.

Congress leader and famous poet Hasrat Mohani and Communist Party of India leader Swami Kumaranand had demanded complete independence (Purna Swaraj) from the British in 1921 and put the resolution during an All-India Congress Forum at the Ahmedabad Session of AICC. Maghfoor Ahmad Ajazi supported the 'Purna Swaraj' motion demanded by Hasrat Mohani.

In 1928, India League was established by V. K. Krishna Menon in London to demand total independence from the British rule. This organisation has been described as "the principal organisation promoting Indian nationalism in pre-war Britain".

Following the rejection of the Simon Commission's rejections, an all-party conference was held at Mumbai in May 1928 to instill a sense of camaraderie. The conference appointed a committee under Motilal Nehru to create a constitution for India. The Kolkata session of the Indian National Congress asked the British government to accord India dominion status by December 1929, or face a countrywide civil disobedience movement.

Amid rising discontent and increasingly violent regional movements, a call for complete sovereignty and an end to British rule found greater support from the people. At the Lahore session in December 1929, the Indian National Congress adopted the aim of complete self-rule. It authorised the Working Committee to launch a civil disobedience movement throughout the country. It was decided that 26 January 1930 should be observed all over India as the Purna Swaraj (complete self-rule) Day.

The flag adopted, during the Purna Swaraj movement, in 1931 and used by the Provisional Government during the subsequent years of the Second World War.

The Gandhi–Irwin Pact was signed in March 1931, and the government agreed to release political prisoners. Mahatma Gandhi managed to have over 90,000 political prisoners released under this pact. However, his appeal to terminate the death sentences of Bhagat Singh, Sukhdev Thapar and Shivaram Rajguru was not accepted by the British. For the next few years, Congress and the government negotiated until the Government of India Act 1935 emerged. The Muslim League disputed the claim of the Congress to represent all people of India, while the Congress disputed the Muslim League's claim to voice the aspirations of all Muslims. The Civil Disobedience Movement launched a new chapter in the Indian independence movement. It did not succeed by itself, but it brought the Indian population together, under the Indian National Congress's leadership. The movement resulted in self rule being a talking point once again, and recruited more Indians to the idea. The movement allowed the Indian independence community to revive their inner confidence and strength against the British Government. In addition, the movement weakened the authority of the British and aided in the end of the British Empire in India. Overall, the civil disobedience Movement was an essential achievement in the history of Indian self-rule because it persuaded New Delhi of the role of the masses in self-determination.

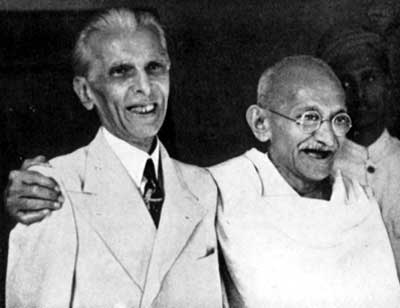
Jinnah with Mahatma Gandhi, 1944.

== Elections and the Lahore resolution ==
The Government of India Act 1935, the voluminous and final constitutional effort at governing British India, articulated three major goals: establishing a loose federal structure, achieving provincial autonomy, and safeguarding minority interests through separate electorates. The federal provisions, intended to unite princely states and British India at the centre, were not implemented because of ambiguities in safeguarding the existing privileges of princes. In February 1937, however, provincial autonomy became a reality when elections were held; the Congress emerged as the dominant party with a clear majority in five provinces and held an upper hand in two, while the Muslim League performed poorly.

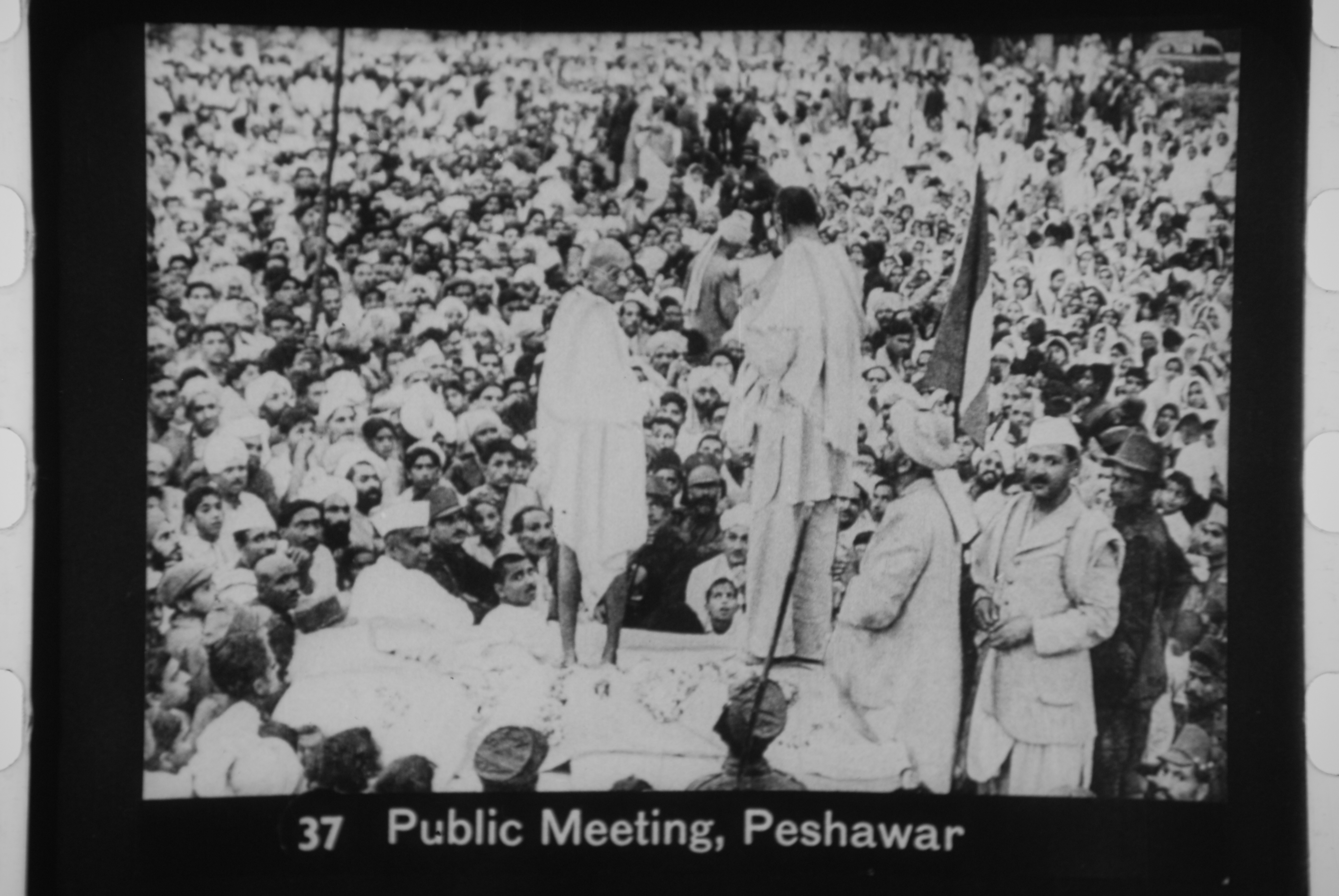
Gandhi and Abdul Ghaffar Khan at a pro-independence rally in Peshawar, 1938

In 1939, the Viceroy Linlithgow declared India's entrance into the Second World War without consulting provincial governments. In protest, the Congress asked all of its elected representatives to resign from the government. Muhammad Ali Jinnah, the president of the All-India Muslim League, persuaded participants at the annual Muslim League session at Lahore in 1940 to adopt what later came to be known as the Lahore Resolution, demanding the division of India into two separate sovereign states, one Muslim, the other Hindu; sometimes referred to as Two Nation Theory. Although the idea of Pakistan had been introduced as early as 1930, very few had responded to it.

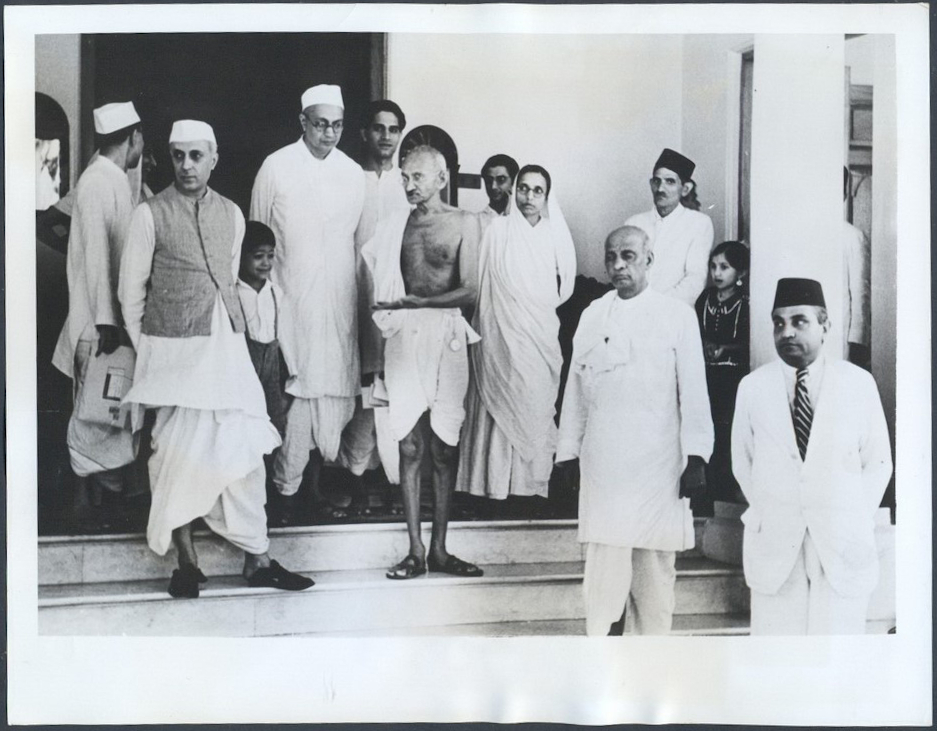
A news photo from 1939, showing Nehru, Gandhi, and Sardar Patel (to the right, in the foreground, wearing the dhoti) in Bombay.

In opposition to the Lahore Resolution, the All India Azad Muslim Conference gathered in Delhi in April 1940 to voice its support for a united India. Its members included several Islamic organisations in India, as well as 1400 nationalist Muslim delegates; the "attendance at the Nationalist meeting was about five times than the attendance at the League meeting."

The All-India Muslim League worked to try to silence those Muslims who stood against the partition of India, often using "intimidation and coercion". The murder of the All India Azad Muslim Conference leader Allah Bakhsh Soomro also made it easier for the All-India Muslim League to demand the creation of Pakistan.

== Revolutionary movement ==
There is no real connection between these two unrests, labour, and Congress opposition. But their very existence and coexistence, explains and fully justifies the attention, which Lord Irwin gave to the labour problems.

- London Times, 29 January 1928

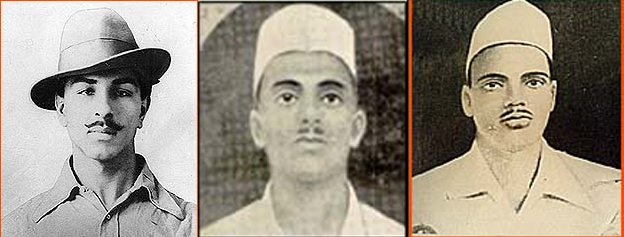
Bhagat Singh (left), Sukhdev (center), and Rajguru (right) are considered among the most influential revolutionaries of the Indian independence movement.

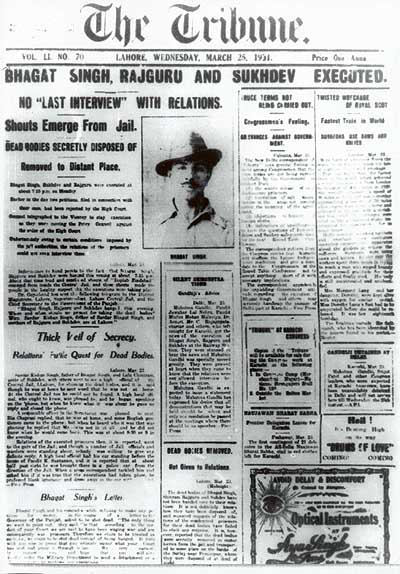
Front page of the Tribune (25 March 1931), reporting the execution of Bhagat Singh, Rajguru and Sukhdev by the British.

Apart from a few stray struggles, revolutions against the British rulers did not occur before the beginning of the 20th century. The Indian revolutionary underground began gathering momentum through the first decade of the 20th century, with groups arising in Bengal, Maharashtra, Odisha, Bihar, Uttar Pradesh, Punjab, and the Madras Presidency including what is now called South India. More groups were scattered around India. Particularly notable movements arose in Bengal, especially around the Partition of Bengal in 1905, and in Punjab after 1907. In the former case, it was the educated, intelligent and dedicated youth of the urban middle class Bhadralok community that came to form the "classic" Indian revolutionary, while the latter had an immense support base in the rural and military society of Punjab.

In Bengal, the Anushilan Samiti emerged from conglomerations of local youth groups and gyms (Akhra) in Bengal in 1902, forming two prominent and somewhat independent arms in East and West Bengal identified as Dhaka Anushilan Samiti in Dhaka (modern-day Bangladesh), and the Jugantar group (centred at Calcutta) respectively. Led by nationalists of the likes of Aurobindo Ghosh and his brother Barindra Ghosh, the Samiti was influenced by philosophies as diverse as Hindu Shakta philosophy propounded by Bengali literature Bankim and Vivekananda, Italian Nationalism, and Pan-Asianism of Kakuzo Okakura. The Samiti was involved in several noted incidences of revolutionary terrorism against British interests and administration in India within the decade of its founding, including early attempts to assassinate Raj officials whilst led by Ghosh brothers. In the meantime, in Maharashtra and Punjab arose similarly militant nationalist feelings. The District Magistrate of Nasik, A.M.T. Jackson was shot dead by Anant Kanhere in December 1909, followed by the death of Robert D'Escourt Ashe at the hands of Vanchi Iyer.

Indian nationalism made headway through Indian societies as far as Paris and London. In London India House under the patronage of Shyamji Krishna Verma came under increasing scrutiny for championing and justifying violence in the cause of Indian nationalism, which found in Indian students in Britain and from Indian expatriates in Paris Indian Society avid followers. By 1907, through Indian nationalist Madame Bhikaji Rustom Cama's links to Russian revolutionary Nicholas Safranski, Indian groups including Bengal revolutionaries as well as India House under V.D. Savarkar were able to obtain manuals for manufacturing bombs. India House was also a source of arms and seditious literature that was rapidly distributed in India. In addition to The Indian Sociologist, pamphlets like Bande Mataram and Oh Martyrs! by Savarkar extolled revolutionary violence. Direct influences and incitement from India House were noted in several incidents of political violence, including assassinations, in India at the time. One of the two charges against Savarkar during his trial in Bombay was for abetting the murder of the District Magistrate of Nasik, A.M.T. Jackson, by Anant Kanhere in December 1909. The arms used were directly traced through an Italian courier to India House. Ex-India House residents M.P.T. Acharya and V.V.S. Aiyar were noted in the Rowlatt report to have aided and influenced political assassinations, including the murder of Robert D'Escourt Ashe. The Paris-Safranski link was strongly suggested by French police to be involved in a 1907 attempt in Bengal to derail the train carrying the Lieutenant-Governor Sir Andrew Fraser.

The activities of nationalists abroad is believed to have shaken the loyalty of several native regiments of the British Indian Army. The assassination of William Hutt Curzon Wyllie in the hands of Madanlal Dhingra was highly publicised and saw increasing surveillance and suppression of Indian nationalism. These were followed by the 1912 attempt on the life of Viceroy of India. Following this, the nucleus of networks formed in India House, the Anushilan Samiti, nationalists in Punjab, and the nationalism that arose among Indian expatriates and labourers in North America, a different movement began to emerge in the North American Ghadar Party, culminating in the Sedetious conspiracy of World War I led by Rash Behari Bose and Lala Hardayal.

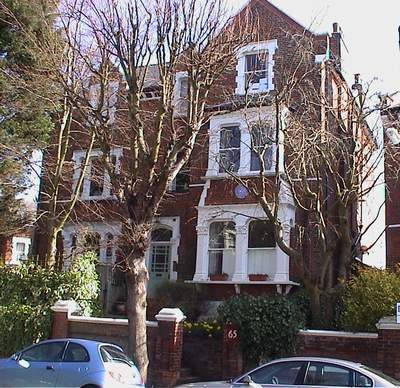
India House founded by Shyamji Krishna Varma to promote nationalist views among Indian students in Britain. Several blue plaques commemorate the stay of its various Indian revolutionaries including: Madan Lal Dhingra, V. V. S. Aiyar, Vinayak Damodar Savarkar, Senapati Bapat, M. P. T. Acharya, Anant Laxman Kanhere and Chempakaraman Pillai.

However, the emergence of the Gandhian movement slowly began to absorb the different revolutionary groups. The Bengal Samiti moved away from its philosophy of violence in the 1920s, when a number of its members identified closely with the Congress and Gandhian non-violent movement. Revolutionary nationalist violence saw a resurgence after the collapse of Gandhian non-cooperation movement in 1922. In Bengal, this saw reorganisation of groups linked to the Samiti under the leadership of Surya Sen and Hem Chandra Kanungo. A spate of violence led up to the enactment of the Bengal Criminal Law Amendment in the early 1920s, which recalled the powers of incarceration and detention of the Defence of India Act. In north India, remnants of Punjab and Bengalee revolutionary organisations reorganised, notably under Sachindranath Sanyal, founding the Hindustan Republican Association with Chandrashekhar Azad in north India.

The HSRA had strong influences from leftist ideologies. Hindustan Socialist Republican Association (HSRA) was formed under the leadership of Chandrasekhar Azad. Kakori train robbery was done largely by the members of HSRA. Several Congress leaders from Bengal, especially Subhash Chandra Bose, were accused by the British Government of having links with and allowing patronage to the revolutionary organisations during this time. The violence and radical philosophy revived in the 1930s, when revolutionaries of the Samiti and the HSRA were involved in the Chittagong armoury raid and the Kakori conspiracy and other attempts against the administration in British India and Raj officials. Sachindra Nath Sanyal mentored revolutionaries in the Hindustan Socialist Republican Army (HSRA), including Bhagat Singh and Jatindra Nath Das, among others; including arms training and how to make bombs. Bhagat Singh and Batukeshwar Dutt threw a bomb inside the Central Legislative Assembly on 8 April 1929 protesting against the passage of the Public Safety Bill and the Trade Disputes Bill while raising slogans of "Inquilab Zindabad", though no one was killed or injured in the bomb incident. Bhagat Singh surrendered after the bombing incident and a trial was conducted. Sukhdev and Rajguru were also arrested by police during search operations after the bombing incident. Following the trial (Central Assembly Bomb Case), Bhagat Singh, Sukhdev and Rajguru were hanged in 1931. Allama Mashriqi founded Khaksar Tehreek in order to direct particularly the Muslims towards the self-rule movement. Some of its members left for the Indian National Congress then led by Subhas Chandra Bose, while others identified more closely with Communism. The Jugantar branch formally dissolved in 1938. On 13 March 1940, Udham Singh shot Michael O'Dwyer (the last political murder outside India), generally held responsible for the Amritsar Massacre, in London. However, the revolutionary movement gradually disseminated into the Gandhian movement. As the political scenario changed in the late 1930s — with the mainstream leaders considering several options offered by the British and with religious politics coming into play — revolutionary activities gradually declined. Many past revolutionaries joined mainstream politics by joining Congress and other parties, especially communist ones, while many of the activists were kept under hold in different jails across the country. Indians who were based in the UK, joined the India League and the Indian Workers Association, partaking in revolutionary activities in Britain.

Within a short time of its inception, these organisations became the focus of an extensive police and intelligence operations. Operations against Anushilan Samiti saw founding of the Special Branch of Calcutta Police. The intelligence operations against India House saw the founding of the Indian Political Intelligence Office which later grew to be the Intelligence Bureau in independent India. Heading the intelligence and missions against Ghadarite movement and India revolutionaries was the MI5(g) section, and at one point involved the Pinkerton's detective agency. Notable officers who led the police and intelligence operations against Indian revolutionaries, or were involved in it, at various time included John Arnold Wallinger, Sir Robert Nathan, Sir Harold Stuart, Vernon Kell, Sir Charles Stevenson-Moore and Sir Charles Tegart, as well as W. Somerset Maugham. The threat posed by the activities of the Samiti in Bengal during World War I, along with the threat of a Ghadarite uprising in Punjab, saw the passage of Defence of India Act 1915. These measures saw the arrest, internment, transportations, and execution of several revolutionaries linked to the organisation, and was successful in crushing the East Bengal Branch. In the aftermath of the war, the Rowlatt committee recommended extending the Defence of India Act (as the Rowlatt act) to thwart any possible revival of the Samiti in Bengal and the Ghadarite movement in Punjab.

In the 1920s, Alluri Sitarama Raju led the Manyam Rebellion of 1922–24, during which a band of tribal leaders and other sympathisers fought a guerrilla war against the British Raj. Local people referred to Raju as "Manyam Veerudu" ("Hero of the Jungles"). After the passage of the 1882 Madras Forest Act, the restrictions on the free movement of tribal peoples in the forest prevented them from engaging in their traditional podu (Slash-and-burn) agricultural system, which involved shifting cultivation. Raju started a protest movement in the Manyam forests of Madras Presidency (present-day Alluri Sitharama Raju district of Andhra Pradesh). Inspired by the patriotic zeal of revolutionaries in Bengal, Raju raided police stations in and around Chintapalle, Rampachodavaram, Dammanapalli, Krishnadevipeta, Rajavommangi, Addateegala, Narsipatnam and Annavaram. Raju and his followers stole guns and ammunition and killed several British Indian Army officers, including Scott Coward near Dammanapalli. The British campaign lasted for nearly a year from December 1922. Raju was eventually trapped by the British in the forests of Chintapalli then tied to a tree and shot dead with a rifle.

The Kallara-Pangode Struggle was one of some 39 agitations against the Government of India. The Home department has later notified about 38 movements/struggles across Indian territories as the ones that culminated in self-rule ended the British Raj.

Vanchinathan, in a letter found in his pocket, stated the following:

I dedicate my life as a small contribution to my motherland. I am alone responsible for this.

The mlechas of England having captured our country, tread over the Sanatana Dharma of the Hindus and destroy them. Every Indian is trying to drive out the English and get swarajyam and restore Sanatana Dharma. Our Raman, Sivaji, Krishnan, Guru Govindan, Arjuna ruled our land protecting all dharmas, but in this land, they are making arrangements to crown George V, a mlecha, and one who eats the flesh of cows.
Three thousand Madrasees have taken a vow to kill George V as soon as he lands in our country. In order to make others know our intention, I who am the least in the company, have done this deed this day. This is what everyone in Hindustan should consider it as his duty.
I will kill Ashe, whose arrival here is to celebrate the crowning of cow-eater King George V in this glorious land which was once ruled by great Samrats. This I do to make them understand the fate of those who cherish the thought of enslaving this sacred land. I, as the least of them, wish to warn George by killing Ashe.
Vande Mataram. Vande Mataram. Vande Mataram

-Vanchinathan

== Final process of Indian self-rule movement ==
In 1937, provincial elections were held and the Congress came to power in seven of the eleven provinces. This was a strong indicator of the Indian people's support for complete self-rule.

When the Second World War started, Viceroy Linlithgow unilaterally declared India a belligerent state on the side of Britain, without consulting the elected Indian representatives. In opposition to Linlithgow's action, the entire Congress leadership resigned from the provincial and local governments. The Muslims and Sikhs, by contrast, strongly supported the war effort and gained enormous stature in London. Defying Congress, millions of Indians supported the war effort, and indeed the British Indian Army became the largest volunteer force, numbering 2,500,000 men during the war.

Especially during the Battle of Britain in 1940, Gandhi resisted calls for massive civil disobedience movements that came from within as well as outside his party, stating he did not seek India's self-rule out of the ashes of a destroyed Britain. In 1942, the Congress launched the Quit India movement. There was some violence but the Raj cracked down and arrested tens of thousands of Congress leaders, including all the main national and provincial figures. They were not released until the end of the war was in sight in 1945.

The self-rule movement included the Kakori conspiracy (9 August 1925) led by Indian youth under the leadership of Pandit Ram Prasad Bismil and masterminded by Rajendra Lahiri; and the Azad Hind movement, whose main protagonist Netaji Subhas Chandra Bose was a former leader of Congress. From its earliest wartime inception, Bose joined the Axis powers to fight Britain.

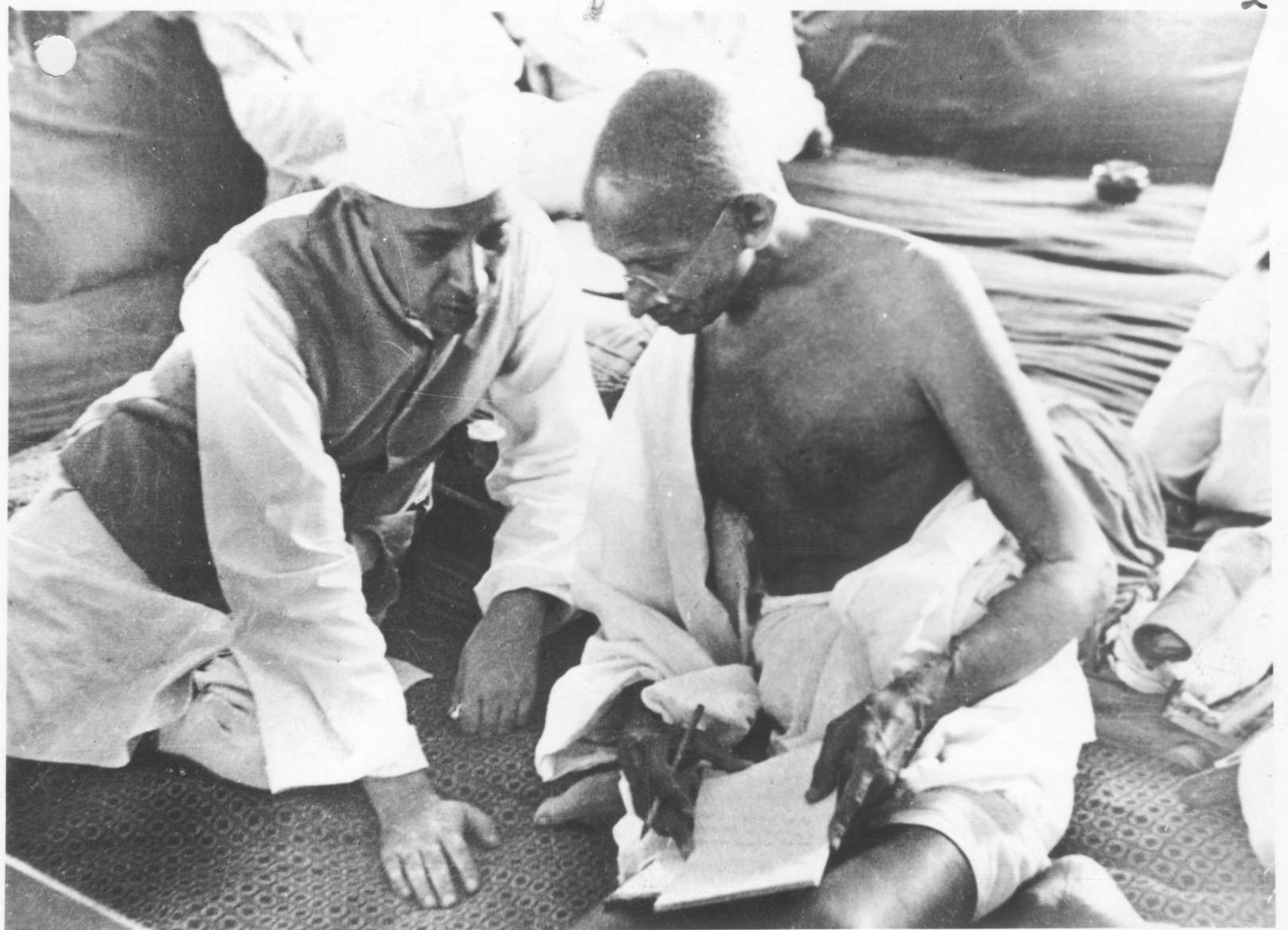
Mahatma Gandhi discusses the Quit India Movement with Nehru

=== Quit India Movement ===
The Quit India Movement (also known as Bharat Chhodo Andolan) was a civil disobedience movement in India which commenced on 8 August 1942 in response to Gandhi's call for immediate self-rule by Indians and against sending Indians to World War II. He asked all teachers to leave their schools, and other Indians to leave their respective jobs and take part in this movement. Due to Gandhi's political influence, his request was followed by a significant proportion of the population. In addition, Congress-led the Quit India Movement to demand the British to leave India and transfer the political power to a representative government.

During the movement, Gandhi and his followers continued to use non-violence against British rule. This movement was where Gandhi gave his famous message, "Do or Die!", and this message spread towards the Indian community. In addition, this movement was addressed directly to women as "disciplined soldiers of Indian freedom" and they had to keep the war for independence to go on (against British rule).

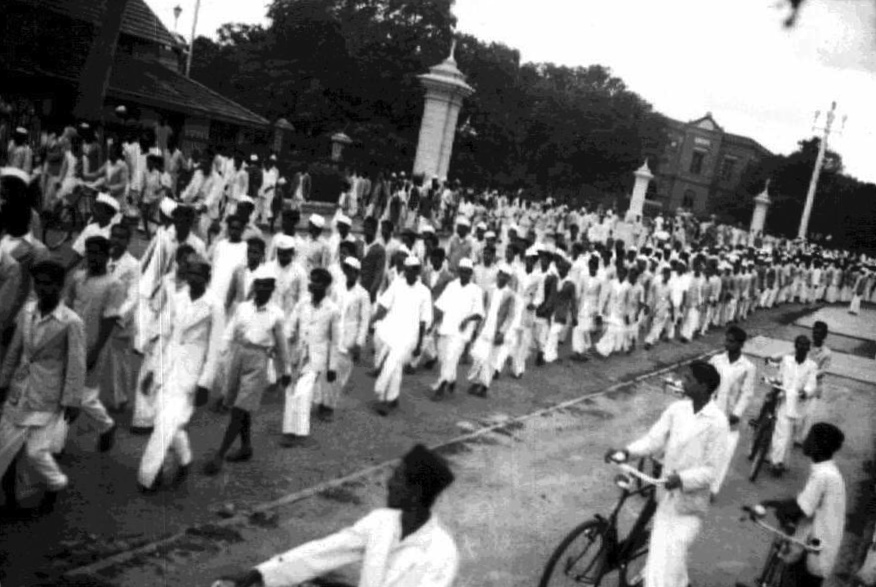
Procession in Bangalore during the Quit India Movement.

At the outbreak of war, the Congress Party had during the Wardha meeting of the working-committee in September 1939, passed a resolution conditionally supporting the fight against fascism, but were rebuffed when they asked for self-rule in return. In March 1942, faced with an increasingly dissatisfied sub-continent only reluctantly participating in the war, and deteriorations in the war situation in Europe and South East Asia, and with growing dissatisfactions among Indian troops- especially in Europe- and among the civilian population in the sub-continent, the British government sent a delegation to India under Stafford Cripps, in what came to be known as the Cripps' Mission. The purpose of the mission was to negotiate with the Indian National Congress a deal to obtain total co-operation during the war, in return of progressive devolution and distribution of power from the crown and the Viceroy to elected Indian legislature. However, the talks failed, having failed to address the key demand of a timeframe towards self-government, and of the definition of the powers to be relinquished, essentially portraying an offer of limited dominion-status that was wholly unacceptable to the Indian movement. To force the British Raj to meet its demands and to obtain definitive word on total self-rule, the Congress decided to launch the Quit India Movement.

The movement aimed to force the British Government to the negotiating table by holding the Allied war effort hostage. The call for determined but passive resistance that signified the certitude that Gandhi foresaw for the movement is best described by his call to Do or Die, issued on 8 August at the Gowalia Tank Maidan in Bombay, since renamed August Kranti Maidan (August Revolution Ground). However, almost the entire Congress leadership, and not merely at the national level, was put into confinement less than 24 hours after Gandhi's speech, and the greater number of the Congress were to spend the rest of the war in jail.

On 8 August 1942, the Quit India resolution was passed at the Mumbai session of the All India Congress Committee (AICC). The draft proposed that if the British did not accede to the demands, a massive Civil Disobedience would be launched. However, it was an extremely controversial decision. At Gowalia Tank, Mumbai, Gandhi urged Indians to follow non-violent civil disobedience. Gandhi told the masses to act as citizens of a sovereign nation and not to follow the orders of the British. The British, already alarmed by the advance of the Japanese army to the India–Burma border, responded the next day by imprisoning Gandhi at the Aga Khan Palace in Pune. The Congress Party's Working Committee, or national leadership was arrested all together and imprisoned at the Ahmednagar Fort. They also banned the party altogether. All the major leaders of the INC were arrested and detained. As the masses were leaderless the protest took a violent turn. Large-scale protests and demonstrations were held all over the country. Workers remained absent en masse and strikes were called. The movement also saw widespread acts of sabotage; Indian underground organisations carried out bomb attacks on allied supply convoys, government buildings were set on fire, electricity lines were disconnected and transport and communication lines were severed. The disruptions were under control in a few weeks and had little impact on the war effort. The movement soon became a leaderless act of defiance, with a number of acts that deviated from Gandhi's principle of non-violence. In large parts of the country, the local underground organisations took over the movement.

All the other major parties rejected the Quit India plan, and most cooperated closely with the British, as did the princely states, the civil service, and the police. The Muslim League supported the Raj and grew rapidly in membership, and in influence with the British.

There was opposition to the Quit India Movement from several political quarters who were fighting for Indian self-rule. Hindu nationalist parties like the Hindu Mahasabha openly opposed the call and boycotted the Quit India Movement. Vinayak Damodar Savarkar, the president of the Hindu Mahasabha at that time, even went to the extent of writing a letter titled "Stick to your Posts", in which he instructed Hindu Sabhaites who happened to be "members of municipalities, local bodies, legislatures or those serving in the army...to stick to their posts" across the country, and not to join the Quit India Movement at any cost.

The other Hindu nationalist organisation, and Mahasabha affiliate Rashtriya Swayamsevak Sangh (RSS) had a tradition of keeping aloof from the anti-British Indian self-rule movement since its founding by K.B. Hedgewar in 1925. In 1942, the RSS, under M.S. Golwalkar completely abstained from joining in the Quit India Movement as well. The Bombay government (British) appreciated the RSS as such, by noting that,

The Sangh has scrupulously kept itself within the law, and in particular, has refrained from taking part in the disturbances that broke out in August 1942.

The British Government stated that the RSS was not at all supporting any civil disobedience against them, and as such their other political activities (even if objectionable) can be overlooked. Further, the British Government also asserted that at Sangh meetings organised during the times of anti-British movements started and fought by the Indian National Congress,

Speakers urged the Sangh members to keep aloof from the congress movement and these instructions were generally observed.

As such, the British government did not crackdown on the RSS and Hindu Mahasabha at all.

The RSS head (sarsanghchalak) during that time, M.S. Golwalkar later openly admitted to the fact that the RSS did not participate in the Quit India Movement. However, such an attitude during the Indian independence movement also led to the Sangh being viewed with distrust and anger, both by the general Indian public, as well as certain members of the organisation itself. In Golwalkar's own words,

In 1942 also, there was a strong sentiment in the hearts of many. At that time too, the routine work of the Sangh continued. Sangh decided not to do anything directly. 'Sangh is the organisation of inactive people, their talks have no substance' was the opinion uttered not only by outsiders but also our own swayamsevaks.

Several violent incidents against British officials also took place during the Quit India movement around the country. The British arrested tens of thousands of leaders, keeping them imprisoned until 1945. Ultimately, the British government realised that India was ungovernable in the long run, and the question for the postwar era became how to exit gracefully and peacefully.

=== Others ===
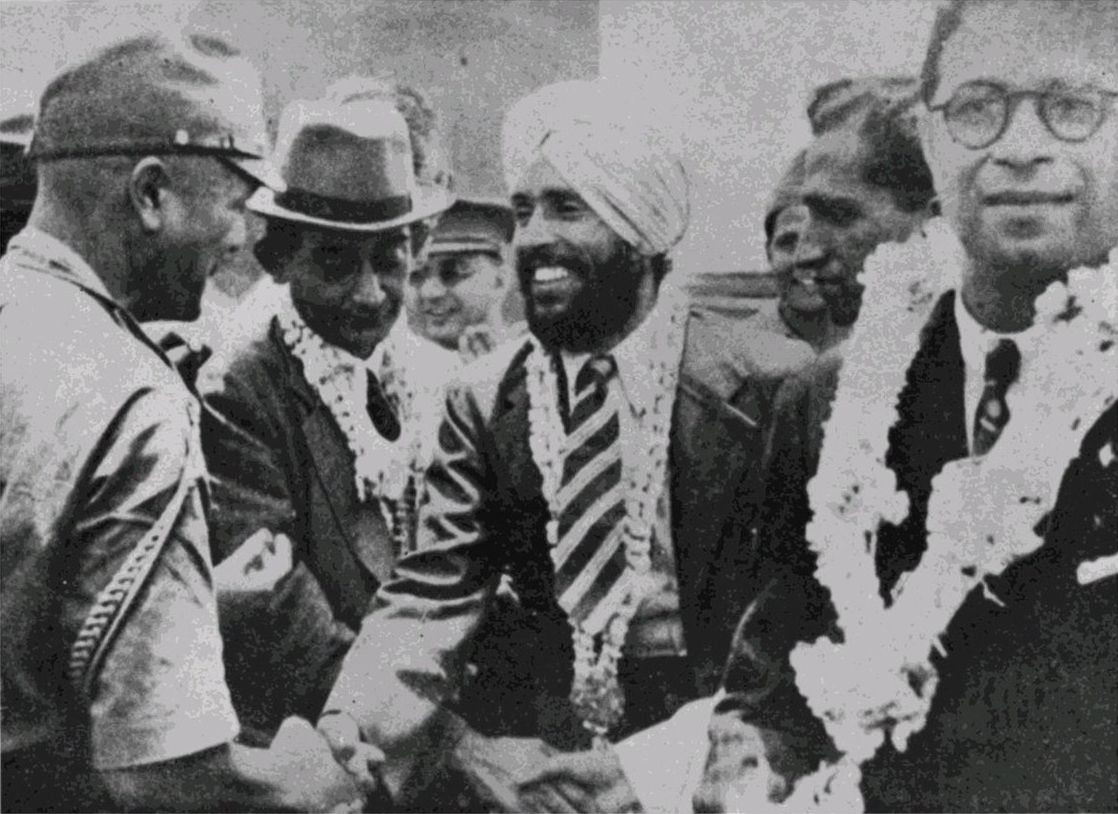
Major Iwaichi Fujiwara greets Mohan Singh, leader of the First Indian National Army. Circa April 1942.

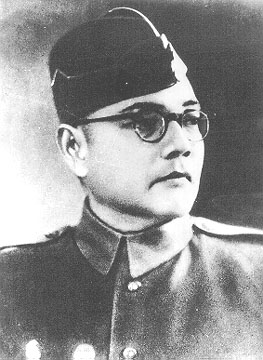
Subhas Chandra Bose founded the Indian Legion and revamped the Indian National Army.

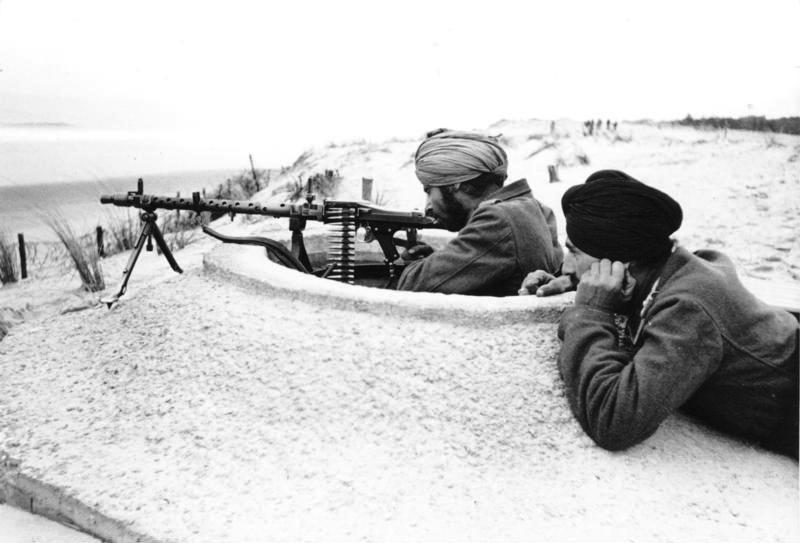
Sikh soldiers of the Indian Legion guarding the Atlantic Wall in France in March 1944.

India's entry into the world war was strongly opposed by Subhas Chandra Bose. Bose had been elected President of the Congress in 1938 and 1939 but later resigned owing to differences of opinion with the Congress, however he remained emotionally attached to Congress for the remainder of his life. After his resignation he formed his own wing separated from the mainstream Congress leadership known as Forward bloc which was a loci focus for ex-congress leaders holding socialist views. Bose then founded the All India Forward Bloc. In 1940 the British authorities in Calcutta placed Bose under house arrest. However, he escaped and made his way through Afghanistan to Nazi Germany to seek Hitler and Mussolini's help for raising an army to fight the British. The Free India Legion comprising Erwin Rommel's Indian POWs was formed. After a dramatic decline in Germany's military fortunes, a German land invasion of India became untenable. Hitler advised Bose to go to Japan where a submarine was arranged to transport Bose, who was ferried to Japanese Southeast Asia, where he formed the Azad Hind Government. The Provisional Free Indian Government in exile reorganised the Japanese collaboration unit. Indian National Army composed of Indian POWs and volunteer Indian expatriates in South-East Asia, with the help of the Japanese. It aimed to reach India as a fighting force that would build on public resentment to inspire revolt among Indian soldiers of the Raj.

The INA was to see action against the Allies, including the British Indian Army, in the forests of Arakan, Burma, and in Assam, laying siege to Imphal and Kohima with the Japanese 15th Army. During the war, the Andaman and Nicobar islands were captured by the Japanese and handed over by them to the INA.

While several Japanese officers, even those like Fujiwara, who were devoted to the Indian cause, observed Bose as a militarily incompetent as well as an unrealistic and stubborn man who saw only his own needs and problems and could not observe the larger picture of the war as the Japanese had to.

The INA failed owing to disrupted logistics, poor supplies from the Japanese, and lack of training. The Azad Hind Fauj surrendered unconditionally to the British in Singapore in 1945. Subhas Chandra Bose's death occurred from third-degree burns on 18 August 1945 after his overloaded Japanese plane crashed in Japanese-ruled Formosa (now Taiwan).

Trials against members of the INA began in late 1945, and included the infamous joint court-martial of key figures Shah Nawaz Khan and Prem Sahgal. Several Congress members including Tej Bahadur Sapru, Aruna Asaf Ali and Jawaharlal Nehru played a significant role in getting INA members released.

HMIS Hindustan at Bombay Harbour after the war, was occupied by mutineers during the Royal Indian Navy Mutiny.

The Royal Indian Navy Mutiny was a failed insurrection which encompassed a total strike and subsequent mutiny by Indian sailors of the Royal Indian Navy on board ship and shore establishments at Bombay (Mumbai) harbour on 18 February 1946. From the initial flashpoint in Bombay, the mutiny spread and found support throughout British India, from Karachi to Calcutta and ultimately came to involve 78 ships, 20 shore establishments and 10,000 sailors.

The agitations, mass strikes, demonstrations and consequently support for the mutineers, therefore continued several days even after the mutiny had been called off. Along with this, the assessment may be made that it described in crystal clear terms to the government that the British Indian Armed forces could no longer be universally relied upon for crisis support, and it was more likely itself to be the source of the sparks that would ignite trouble in a country fast slipping out of the scenario of political settlement.

The mutiny ended with the surrender of the revolting sailors to the British officials. Congress and the Muslim League had convinced Indian sailors to surrender. They condemned the mutiny due to the political and military risks of unrest.

== Sovereignty and partition of India ==
On 3 June 1947, Viscount Louis Mountbatten, the last British Governor-General of India, announced the partitioning of British India into India and Pakistan. With the speedy passage of the Indian Independence Act 1947, at 11:57 on 14 August 1947 Pakistan was declared a separate nation. Then at 12:02 A.M., on 15 August 1947 India became a sovereign and democratic nation. Eventually, 15 August became Independence Day for India marking the end of British India. Also on 15 August, both Pakistan and India had the right to remain in or remove themselves from the British Commonwealth.

Violent clashes between Hindus, Sikhs, and Muslims followed. Prime Minister Jawaharlal Nehru and deputy prime minister Vallabhbhai Patel had invited Mountbatten to continue as Governor General of India during the period of transition. He was replaced in June 1948 by Rajagopalachari. In May 1947, Nehru declared that any princely state which refused to join the Constituent Assembly would be treated as an enemy state. Patel took on the responsibility for bringing princely states into the Union of India, steering efforts by his "iron fist in a velvet glove" policies. India used military force to integrate Junagadh, Hyderabad State (Operation Polo) and Kashmir (Instrument of Accession) to India.

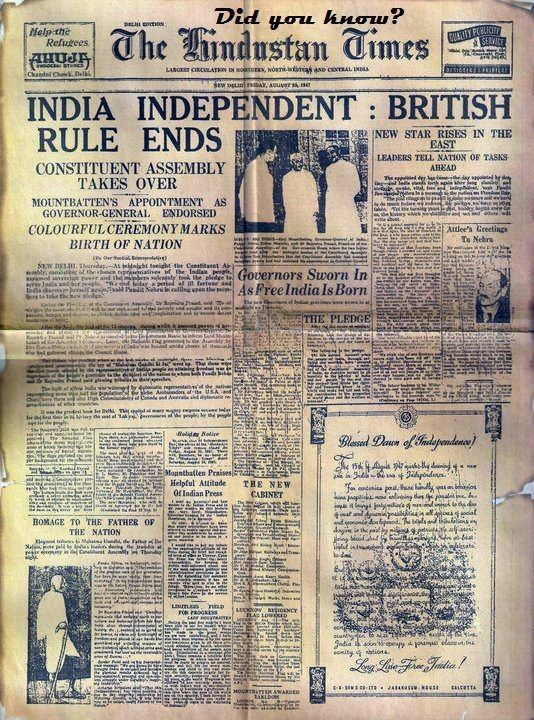
The Hindustan Times reporting on Indian independence.

The Constituent Assembly, headed by the prominent lawyer, reformer and Dalit leader, B.R. Ambedkar was tasked with heading the creation of the constitution of independent India. The Constituent Assembly completed the work of drafting the constitution on 26 November 1949; on 26 January 1950, the Republic of India was officially proclaimed. The Constituent Assembly elected Rajendra Prasad was the first President of India, taking over from Governor General Rajgopalachari. Subsequently, the French ceded Chandernagore in 1951, and Pondichéry and its remaining Indian colonies by 1954. Indian troops annexed Goa and Portugal's other Indian enclaves in 1961, and Sikkim voted to join the Indian Union in 1975 after the Indian victory over China in Nathu La and Cho La.

Following self-rule in 1947, India remained in the Commonwealth of Nations, and relations between the UK and India have since become friendly. There are many areas in which the two countries seek stronger ties for mutual benefit, and the two nations also have strong cultural and social ties. The UK has an ethnic Indian population of over 1.6 million. In 2010, Prime Minister David Cameron described Indian – British relations as a "New Special Relationship".

== See also ==
- Women of the Indian independence movement
- K. L. Nursey album
