= Christmas Day Plot =

Indian revolutionary movement conspiracy

The first Christmas Day plot was a conspiracy made by the Indian revolutionary movement in 1909: during the year-ending holidays, the Governor of Bengal organised a ball at his residence in the presence of the Viceroy, the Commander-in-Chief and all the high-ranking officers and officials of the Capital (Calcutta). The 10th Jat Regiment was in charge of the security. Followers of Jatindranath Mukherjee( Bagha Jatin), its soldiers decided to blow up the ballroom and take advantage of destroying the colonial Government. In keeping with his predecessor Otto (William Oskarovich) von Klemm, a friend of Lokmanya Tilak, on 6 February 1910, M. Arsenyev, the Russian Consul-General, wrote to St Petersburg that it had been intended to "arouse in the country a general perturbation of minds and, thereby, afford the revolutionaries an opportunity to take the power in their hands." According to R. C. Majumdar, "The police had suspected nothing and it is hard to say what the outcome would have been had the soldiers not been betrayed by one of their comrades who informed the authorities about the impending coup".

The second Christmas Day plot was to initiate an insurrection in Bengal in British India during World War I with German arms and support. Scheduled for Christmas Day, 1915, the plan was conceived and led by the Jugantar group under the Indian Bengali revolutionary Bagha Jatin (Jatindranath Mukherjee), to be coordinated with simultaneous uprising in the British colony of Burma and Kingdom of Siam under direction of the Ghadar Party, along with a German raid on the South Indian city of Madras and the British penal colony in Andaman Islands. The aim of the plot was to seize the Fort William, isolate Bengal and capture the capital city of Calcutta, which was then to be used as a staging ground for a pan-Indian revolution. The Christmas Day plot was one of the later plans for pan-Indian mutiny during the war that were coordinated between the Indian nationalist underground, the "Indian independence committee" set up by the Germans in Berlin, the Ghadar Party in North America, and the German Foreign office. The plot was ultimately thwarted after British intelligence uncovered the plot through German and Indian double agents in Europe and Southeast Asia.

== Background ==
The growth of the Indian middle class during the 19th century, amidst competition among regional powers and the ascendancy of the British East India Company, led to a growing sense of "Indian" identity. The development of this viewpoint contributed to an increasing sense of nationalism in India during the latter part of the 19th century. Its speed was abetted by the creation of the Indian National Congress in India in 1885 by A. O. Hume. The Congress developed into a platform for the demands of political liberalization, increased autonomy and social reform. However, the nationalist movement became strong, radical and violent in Bengal and, later, in Punjab. Notable, if smaller, movements also appeared in Maharashtra, Madras and other areas in the South. Organized political terrorism started to emerge in Bengal at the onset of the 20th century. By 1902, Calcutta had three societies working under the umbrella of Anushilan Samiti, a society earlier founded by a Calcutta barrister by the name of Pramatha Mitra. These included Mitra's own group, another led by a Bengalee lady by the name of Sarala Devi, and a third one led by Aurobindo Ghosh, one of the strongest proponents of militant nationalism of the time. By 1905, the works of Aurobindo and his brother Barin Ghosh allowed Anushilan Samity to spread through Bengal. The controversial 1905 partition of Bengal had a widespread political impact: it stimulated radical nationalist sentiments in the Bhadralok community in Bengal, and helped Anushilan acquire a support base among of educated, politically conscious and disaffected young in local youth societies of Bengal. The Dhaka branch of Anushilan was led by Pulin Behari Das and spread branches through East Bengal and Assam. Aurobindo and Bipin Chandra Pal, a Bengali politician, began in 1907 the radical Bengali nationalist publication of Jugantar ("Change"), and its English counterpart Bande Mataram. Among the early recruits who emerged noted leaders were Rash Behari Bose, Jatindranath Mukherjee, and Jadugopal Mukherjee.

Anushilan, notably from early on, established links with foreign movements and Indian nationalism abroad. In 1907, Barin Ghosh arranged to send to Paris one of his associates by the name of Hem Chandra Kanungo (Hem Chandra Das), he was to learn the art of bomb-making from Nicholas Safranski, a Russian revolutionary in exile in the French Capital. Paris was also home at the time Madam Cama who was amongst the leading figures of the Paris Indian Society and the India House in London. The bomb manual later found its way through V. D. Savarkar to the press at India House for mass printing. In the meantime, in December 1907 the Bengal revolutionary cell derailed the train carrying the Bengal Lieutenant Governor Sir Andrew Fraser. Anushilan also engaged at this time in a number of notable incidents of political assassinations and dacoities to obtain funds. This was, however, the crest for Anushilan. In 1908, two young recruits, Khudiram Bose and Prafulla Chaki were sent on a mission to Muzaffarpur to assassinate the Chief Presidency Magistrate D.H. Kingsford. The duo bombed a carriage they mistook as Kingsford's, killing two English women. In the aftermath of the murder, Khudiram Bose was arrested while attempting to flee, while Chaki took his own life. Narendra Nath Bhattacharya, then a member of the group, shot and killed Nandalal Bannerjee, the officer who had arrested Khudiram. Police investigations into the murders revealed the organisations quarters in Maniktala suburb of Calcutta and led to a number of arrests, opening the famous Alipore Conspiracy trial. Some of its leadership were executed or incarcerated, while others went underground. Aurobindo Ghosh retired from active politics after serving a prison sentence, his brother Barin was imprisoned for life.

Jatindra Nath Mukherjee avoided apprehension in the Alipore case and assumed leadership of the secret society, which would later be recognized as the Jugantar Party. He revitalized the connections between the central organization in Calcutta and its numerous branches scattered throughout Bengal, Bihar, Orissa, and various locations in Uttar Pradesh. Additionally, he established hideouts in the Sundarbans for members who had gone underground. The group slowly reorganized under Mukherjee's guidance, aided by an emerging leadership that included Amarendra Chatterjee, Naren Bhattacharya, and other younger leaders. Some of its younger members including Tarak Nath Das left India, to prepare scopes abroad. Through the next two years, the organisation operated under the covers of two seemingly detached organisations, Sramajeebi Samabaya (The Labourer's Cooperative) and Harry & Sons. Since 1906, Jatin Mukherjee had been attempting to establish contacts with the 10th Jat Regiment then garrisoned at Fort William in Calcutta. Narendra Nath carried out a number of robberies during this time to obtain funds. A second setback occurred in 1910 when Shamsul Alam, a Bengal Police officer who was in the process of preparing a conspiracy case against the group, was assassinated by an associate of Jatin Mukherjee named Biren Dutta Gupta. The assassination led to the arrests which ultimately precipitated the Howrah-Sibpur Conspiracy Case.

== Pre-war developments ==
While in custody during the Howrah-Sibpur conspiracy trial, a core group formed within the party consisting of the most militant nationalists. These ideas originated from early discussions initiated by Barin Ghosh. This core group envisioned the potential of an Anglo-German conflict in the near future, around which the revolutionaries planned to initiate a guerrilla warfare campaign with support from Germany. The trial highlighted the shift in the group's direction, moving beyond the tactics of the initial revolutionaries, who sought primarily to intimidate the British administration. The core group that emerged during the trial had more profound political motives and ambitions. They expanded on this core to establish an organizational network across Bengal and other regions of India.

The Howrah conspirators were released after about a year when the Howrah-Sibpur case collapsed due to lack of evidence. Released in February 1911, Jatin Mukherjee suspended all excessively violent activities. Following his suspension from his government position, Jatin embarked on a business venture, serving as a contractor for the railway network in Bengal. This role afforded him the opportunity to traverse the Bengal countryside, scouting appropriate sites for the revolutionary initiatives he was orchestrating. In 1906, an early Anushilan member, Jatindranath Banerjee (known as Niralamba Swami), departed from Bengal disguised as a Sanyasi, journeying to the United Provinces and later to Punjab. At Punjab, Niralamba established links with Sardar Ajit Singh and Bhai Kishen Singh (father of Bhagat Singh). Through Kishen Singh, the Bengal revolutionary cell was introduced to Lala Har Dayal when the latter visited India briefly in 1908. Har Dayal was affiliated with the India House, a revolutionary organization in London that was then under V. D. Savarkar. Dayal took pride in the fact that by 1910, he had collaborated closely with Rash Behari Bose. Bose, a Jugantar member employed at the Forest Institute in Dehradun, worked, possibly independently of Jatin Mukherjee, on the revolutionary movement in Uttar Pradesh and Punjab from October 1910. The India House itself was liquidated in 1910 in the aftermath of Sir W. H. Curzon Wyllie's assassination in the hands of Madanlal Dhingra, a member of the London group. Among the India House group who fled Britain was V. N. Chetterjee, who left for Germany. Har Dayal moved to San Francisco after working briefly with the Paris Indian Society. In the United States, nationalism among Indian immigrants was gaining ground, particularly students and working classes. Tarak Nath Das, who had left Bengal for the United States in 1907, was among the noted Indian leaders who engaged in political work, maintaining contact with Sri Aurobindo and Jatin Mukherjee. In California, Har Dayal's arrival bridged a gap between the intellectual agitators in the west coast and the lower classes in the Pacific coast. Welcomed by Taranath Das, he emerged a leading organizer of Indian nationalism amongst the predominantly immigrant labor workers from India, founding the Ghadar movement.

In 1912, Jatin, accompanied by Naren Bhattacharya, met with the Crown Prince of Germany during the latter's visit to Calcutta. They secured an assurance that arms and ammunition would be provided to them. In October of the same year, Rash Behari visited Lahore, where he mobilized Har Dayal's group and initiated a campaign of revolutionary violence, notably highlighted by an assassination attempt on the Viceroy, Lord Hardinge, in December 1912. Basanta Biswas, an associate of Rash Behari sent by Amarendra Chatterjee, had previously been associated with Jatin Mukherjee's circle of followers. Niralamba Swami informed Jatin Mukherjee further about the activities in North India when they met on a pilgrimage to the holy Hindu city of Brindavan. Returning to Bengal, in 1913, Jatin began organizing a large scale relief in the flood-stricken areas around the Damodar. Rash Behari had gone into hiding in Benares after the 1912 attempt on Hardinge, but he joined Jatin Mukherjee on this occasion. Recognizing Jatin Mukherjee as a prominent leader, Bose held multiple meetings with him towards the conclusion of 1913, discussing the potential for a pan-Indian revolution reminiscent of the style seen in 1857.

== World War I ==
In response to Britain's entry to the war on the side of France, Germany had begun actively seeking efforts to weaken the British war efforts by targeting the colonial empire. Germany nurtured links with India nationalists before the war, seeing India as a potential weakness for Britain. In the immediate period preceding the war, Indian nationalist groups had used Germany as a base and potential support. As early as 1913, revolutionary literature referred to the approaching war between Germany and England and the possibility of obtaining German help for the Indian movement. In the early months of the war, German newspapers devoted considerable coverage to Indian distress, social problems, and colonial exploitation by Britain. The Indian situation was included in the German war strategy. The German Chancellor Theobald von Bethmann Hollweg authorized German activity against India in the early weeks of the war, and decision was taken to offer active support to the Indian Nationalists. Under the leadership of the archaeologist and historian Max von Oppenheim, the newly established Intelligence Bureau for the East deliberated on strategies to incite nationalist unrest in India. Oppenheim assisted in the establishment of the Berlin Committee, which was formed by C. R. Pillai. One of the members of this group was V. N. Chatterjee from London's India House. Har Dayal had departed from the United States to Switzerland following his arrest on charges of being an anarchist. He entrusted the leadership of the Ghadar party to Ram Chandra Bharadwaj and, from Switzerland, agreed to extend support to the Berlin Committee. Contacts were established with the Ghadar Party through Indian emissaries and personnel from the German consulate in San Francisco. Germany offered financial support, arms, and military advisors to the plans discussed among the German foreign office, Berlin Committee, and the Indian Ghadar Party in North America. The objective was to covertly transport arms and individuals to India from the United States and the Orient, aiming to incite a nationalist uprising in India in 1914–15, following the model of the 1857 rebellion.

At the onset of the war, Jugantar convened a meeting where Jatin Mukherjee was elected as the supreme commander. During this period, the German consulate in Calcutta managed to establish connections with Jatin, who, following encouragement from Sir Ashutosh, had a meeting with D. Thibault, the Registrar of Calcutta University. The Consul General reported back to Berlin that the Bengal revolutionary cell was significant enough to be considered for active support in undermining the British war effort. Jugantar began a campaign of politically motivated armed robberies to obtain funds and arms. On August 26, the Calcutta branch of Rodda & Co, a major arms supplier in the region, was subject to a robbery. The perpetrators absconded with ten cases of arms and ammunition, which included 50 Mauser Pistols and 46,000 rounds of ammunition.

=== Ghadar ===
Jatin's cousin Dhan Gopal Mukerji, then a student at UC Berkeley, had already been in the United States for some time. In 1914, Jatin sent to San Francisco a party member by the name of Satyendra Sen with the purpose of contacting the Ghadar party. Sen returned in November 1914 with intelligence regarding the schemes orchestrated by the Berlin Committee under the leadership of Virendranath Chattopadhyaya and the German military attaché Franz von Papen in Washington. Their plan involved procuring a substantial shipment of arms to be transported to India by sea. He had previously obtained $200,000 worth of small arms and ammunition through Krupp agents and organized its transportation to India via San Diego, Java, and Burma. The arsenal comprised 8,080 Springfield rifles from the Spanish–American War era, 2,400 Springfield carbines, 410 Hotchkiss repeating rifles, 4,000,000 cartridges, 500 Colt revolvers with 100,000 cartridges, and 250 Mauser pistols, along with ammunition. Sen had also introduced Jatin to a Ghadarite leader, Kartar Singh Sarabha, who had returned to India to coordinate the plans for the proposed revolt with the Indian underground. Ghadarites, predominantly Indian expatriates from Punjab, were entering India through Calcutta with the mission to rally the Sepoys of the Indian army and organize for a potential mutiny at army centers in the northern region of Punjab. The Commander-in-Chief, Jatin Mukherjee, was tasked with coordinating this effort to enlist support from the Indian army in the eastern region of Bengal. The scheme in Upper India was being orchestrated by Rash Behari from the United Provinces, with assistance from Vishnu Ganesh Pingle, another Ghadarite who also arrived in India from the United States in November 1914, and Sachindra Nath Sanyal (of the Dhaka Anusilan Samiti), who operated from Benares. Bose coordinated with Jatin, and the latter was to lead Bengal into mutiny. The mutiny was scheduled for late February 1915, beginning with Indian army units in Punjab, followed by units in Bengal. The Bengal cell was to look for the Punjab Mail entering the Howrah Station the next day (which would have been cancelled if Punjab was seized) and was to strike immediately. Units as far as Rangoon and Singapore were part of the Rash Behari's plan.

Rash Behari's plans for mutiny failed when, in February 1915, in a situation simmering in Punjab, Ghadar rose prematurely even before Papen had arranged to ship his arsenal. Scheduled for February 21, 1915, information regarding the date and locations reached the Punjab CID through a last-minute recruit, a spy named Kirpal Singh. Suspecting infiltration, a desperate Rash Behari advanced the D-Day to the 19th; however, due to carelessness, Kirpal managed to relay the information back to the Punjab police before it was too late. Mutiny in Punjab was halted on the 19th, followed by suppression of smaller revolts throughout North India. The Singapore garrison managed to revolt openly and held out for some time before it was crushed six days later. Mass arrests followed as the Ghadarites were rounded up in Punjab and the Central Provinces. Key leaders of the conspiracy, including Kartar Singh, Pingle, Kanshi Ram, Bhai Bhagwan Singh and others were arrested. Rash Behari Bose escaped from Lahore and in May 1915 fled to Japan. Other leaders, including Giani Pritam Singh, Swami Satyananda Puri and others fled to Thailand. Jatin Mukherjee and the rest of the Bengal cell went underground.

=== Autumn 1915 ===
Following the unsuccessful February mutiny, determined efforts were made to dismantle the Indian revolutionary movement. With heightened police surveillance to thwart any potential uprisings, prominent Jugantar members advised Jatin to relocate to a more secure location. Balasore on the Orissa coast was chosen as a suitable location, as it was in close proximity to where the German arms were intended to be delivered for the Indian uprising. To streamline the communication with Jatin Mukherjee, a business entity named "Universal Emporium" was established as a branch of Harry & Sons in Calcutta. It was designed to maintain connections with revolutionaries overseas. Therefore, Jatin relocated to a hideout outside Kaptipada village in the native state of Mayurbhanj, which was over thirty miles away from Balasore. Meanwhile, Papen, in collaboration with Chandrakanta Chakrabarti, the self-proclaimed agent of the Berlin Committee in the United States, organized the initial shipment of arms on the schooner Annie Larsen. This operation was executed under a pretense to mislead British agents into believing that the arms were intended for the conflicting parties in the Mexican Civil War. Through a carefully orchestrated plan, the schooner departed from San Diego in March 1915 to meet covertly with a second vessel, the oil tanker SS Maverick, near Socorro Island close to Mexico. The Maverick was destined to sail to the Dutch East Indies. Ineffective coordination led to an unsuccessful rendezvous off Socorro Island. After a month of waiting for the Maverick, the Annie Larsen sailed back to San Diego, only to be instructed to return to the island and await the tanker. The Maverick, delayed by repair work at port, arrived at the rendezvous a month behind schedule. Failing to locate the schooner, the Maverick set course across the Pacific with hopes of tracing the route to Hawaii. The second voyage of the Annie Larsen was unsuccessful due to encountering strong headwinds. Following several unsuccessful endeavors and a return to Hoquiam, Washington, the cargo of the Annie Larsen was confiscated by US customs, prompted by British intelligence concerns. The Maverick traversed the Pacific towards the Dutch East Indies; however, the Captain had no means to alert the Germans there that the ship did not carry the anticipated arms but only bundles of revolutionary literature and a few Indian revolutionaries. In April 1915, without knowledge of the Annie Larsen plan's failure, Papen, with the assistance of Krupp's American representative Hans Tauscher, organized a second arms shipment. This shipment included 7,300 Springfield rifles, 1,930 pistols, 10 Gatling guns, and close to 3,000,000 cartridges. The arms were to be shipped in mid June to Surabaya in the East Indies on the Holland American steamship SS Djember.

== Christmas Day plot ==
German agents in Thailand and Burma, Emil and Theodor Helferrich, who were brothers of the German Finance Minister Karl Helfferich, collaborated with Bagha Jatin through a Jugantar member named Jitendranath Lahiri in March 1915. In April Jatin sent to Batavia Jitendra Nath and Narendranath Bhattacharya, the latter by then his chief lieutenant. Narendranath met with the Helfferich brothers in Batavia through the German Consul and was briefed about the anticipated arrival of the Maverick carrying arms. The two were to guide the Maverick, when she arrived to the coast of the Bay of Bengal. In April 1915, acting on instructions relayed through Chatto, efforts were made to negotiate with the German authorities regarding financial assistance and the provision of arms. While initially designated for Ghadar operations, the Berlin Committee altered the strategy to transport arms into India via the eastern coast, specifically through Hatia on the Chittagong coast, Raimangal in the Sundarbans, and Balasore in Orissa, deviating from the initial plan to use Karachi. Jatin's group was to retrieve these arms from the coast of the Bay of Bengal. For this purpose, Ashwini Lal Roy was sent to Raimangal to receive the Maverick. Jugantar also received funds (estimated to be Rs 33,000 between June and August 1915) from The Helfferich brothers through Harry & Sons in Calcutta.

=== Bengal ===
The date of insurrection was fixed for Christmas Day of 1915. Jatin estimated that he would be able to win over the 14th Rajput Regiment in Calcutta and cut the line to Madras at Balasore and thus, take control of Bengal.

=== Burma ===
To provide the Bengal group enough time to capture Calcutta and to prevent reinforcements from being rushed in, mutiny was planned for Burma with arms smuggled in from Neutral Thailand. This Siam-Burma plan originated early in October 1914 from the Ghadar Party and was concluded in January 1915. Members of the Ghadar movement from branches in China and the United States, including leaders such as Atma Ram, Thakar Singh, and Banta Singh from Shanghai, as well as Santokh Singh and Bhagwan Singh from San Francisco, endeavored to infiltrate the Burma Military Police in Thailand, a force composed predominantly of Sikhs and Punjabi Muslims. Early in 1915, Atma Ram had also visited Calcutta and Punjab and linked up with the revolutionary underground there, including Jugantar. Herambalal Gupta and the German consul at Chicago arranged to have German operatives George Paul Boehm, Henry Schult, and Albert Wehde sent to Siam through Manila with the purpose of training the Indians. Santokh Singh returned to Shanghai tasked to send two expeditions, one to reach the Indian border via Yunnan and the other to penetrate upper Burma and join with revolutionary elements there. While in Manila, the Germans endeavored to transfer the arms cargo from two German ships, the Sachsen and the Suevia, to Siam using a schooner that sought refuge in Manila harbor. However, US Customs stopped these attempts.eanwhile, with the assistance of the German Consul to Thailand, Remy, the Ghadarites set up a training base in the jungles near the Thai-Burma border for Ghadarites arriving from China and Canada. The German Consul General in Shanghai, Knipping, dispatched three officers from the Peking Embassy Guard for training and also coordinated with a Norwegian agent in Swatow to facilitate the smuggling of arms.

=== Andaman ===
At the same time that Jatin's group was to strike in Bengal, a German raid was planned for the penal colony in the Andaman islands. This was to be carried out with a German volunteer force raised from East Indies which would release the political prisoners to raise an expeditionary Indian force that would threaten the Indian coast. The plan was proposed by Vincent Kraft, a German planter in Batavia who had been wounded fighting in France. It was approved by the foreign office on 14 May 1915, after consultation with the Indian committee, and raid was planned for Christmas Day 1915 by a force of nearly one hundred Germans led by a former naval officer von Müller was raised. Knipping made plans for shipping arms to the Andaman islands. However, Vincent Kraft was a double agent, and leaked details of Knippings plans to British intelligence. His own bogus plans for the raid were in the meantime revealed to Beckett by "Oren", but given the successive failures of the Indo-German plans, the plans for the operations were abandoned on the recommendations of both the Berlin Committee and Knipping.

== Culmination ==
The Christmas Day plot was eventually exposed through various channels. The initial details regarding the cargo aboard the Maverick and Jugantar's schemes were disclosed to Beckett, the British Consul in Batavia, by a defecting Baltic-German agent using the alias "Oren." Subsequently, the Maverick was intercepted, and alerts were issued to the British Indian police. Another source of information was the German double agent Vincent Kraft, a plantation owner from Batavia, who divulged details about arms shipments from Shanghai to British authorities after his capture. Upon Kraft's initial arrest, maps of the Bengal coast were discovered on his person, and he willingly provided information indicating that these locations were the planned landing sites for the German arms. As soon as the information reached the British authorities, they alerted the police, particularly in the delta region of the Ganges, and sealed off all the sea approaches on the eastern coast from the Noakhali–Chittagong side to Orissa. Following a raid and search at Harry & Sons, the police discovered evidence that directed them to Kaptipada village, where Jatin was residing with Manoranjan Sengupta and Chittapriya Ray Chaudhuri. Subsequently, a unit from the Police Intelligence Department was sent to Balasore.

=== Bagha Jatin death( Jatindranath Mukherjee) ===
Jatin was informed and advised to vacate his concealment, but his insistence on bringing Niren and Jatish along caused a delay in their departure by a few hours. By the time they set out, a significant police presence, led by senior European officers from Calcutta and Balasore and supported by an army unit from Chandbali in Mayurbhanj State, had arrived in the vicinity. Jatin and his companions journeyed through the forests and hills of Mayurbhanj, eventually reaching Balasore Railway Station after two days.

The police had announced a reward for the capture of five fleeing "bandits", so the local villagers were also in pursuit. During intermittent skirmishes, the group navigated jungles and marshy terrain in heavy rain, eventually establishing a position on September 9, 1915, in an improvised trench amidst undergrowth on a hillock at Chashakhand in Balasore. Chittapriya and his companions suggested that Jatin depart for safety while they guarded the rear. However, Jatin chose to stay with them.The contingent of Government forces approached them in a pincer movement. A gunfight ensued, lasting seventy-five minutes, between the five revolutionaries armed with Mauser pistols and the large number of police and army armed with modern rifles. It ended with an unrecorded number of casualties on the Government side; on the revolutionary side, Chittapriya Ray Chaudhuri died, Jatin and Jatish were seriously wounded, and Manoranjan Sengupta and Niren were captured after their ammunition ran out. Bagha Jatin died, shot by police, in Balasore hospital on 10 September 1915.

=== Siam Burma plan ===
The Thai Police high command, which was largely British, discovered the plans for the Burmese insurrection and Indian police infiltrated the plot through an Indian secret agent who was revealed the details by the Austrian chargé d'affaires. Thailand, although officially neutral, was allied closely with Britain and British India. On 21 July, the newly arrived British Minister Herbert Dering presented Foreign Minister Prince Devawongse with the request for arrest and extradition of Ghadarites identified by the Indian agent, ultimately resulting in the arrest of leading Ghadarites in August. Only a single raid into Burma was launched by six Ghadarites, who were captured and later hanged.

== Footnotes ==
=== References ===
- Acharya, M. P. Tirumala (1992), Yadav, B.D. (ed.), M. P. T. Acharya, Reminiscences of an Indian Revolutionary, Anmol Publications Pvt ltd, ISBN 81-7041-470-9
- Brown, Giles (August 1948), "The Hindu Conspiracy, 1914-1917", The Pacific Historical Review, 17 (3), University of California Press: 299–310, doi:10.2307/3634258, JSTOR 3634258
- Deepak, B. R. (1999), "Revolutionary Activities of the Ghadar Party in China.", China Report, 35, 439, Sage Publications, ISSN 0009-4455
- Desai, A. R. (2005), Social Background of Indian Nationalism, Popular Prakashan, ISBN 81-7154-667-6
- Fraser, Thomas G (April 1977), "Germany and Indian Revolution, 1914-18", Journal of Contemporary History, 12 (2), Sage Publications: 255–272, doi:10.1177/002200947701200203, S2CID 161813088
- Gupta, Amit K (September–October 1997), "Defying Death: Nationalist Revolutionism in India, 1897-1938.", Social Scientist, 25 (9/10): 3–27, doi:10.2307/3517678, JSTOR 3517678
- Hoover, Karl. (May 1985), "The Hindu Conspiracy in California, 1913-1918", German Studies Review, 8 (2), German Studies Association: 245–261, doi:10.2307/1428642, JSTOR 1428642
- Hopkirk, Peter (2001), On Secret Service East of Constantinople, Oxford Paperbacks, ISBN 978-0-19-280230-9
- Hughes, Thomas L. (October 2002), "The German Mission to Afghanistan, 1915–1916", German Studies Review, 25 (3), German Studies Association: 447–476, doi:10.2307/1432596, ISSN 0149-7952, JSTOR 1432596
- Majumdar, Bimanbehari (1966), Militant Nationalism in India, General Printers & Publishers
- Majumdar, Ramesh C (1971), History of the Freedom Movement in India, vol. II, Firma K. L. Mukhopadhyay, ISBN 978-81-7102-099-7
- Majumdar, Ramesh C (1975), History of the Freedom Movement in India, vol. II, Firma K. L. Mukhopadhyay, ISBN 978-81-7102-099-7.
- Mitra, Subrata K. (2006), The Puzzle of India's Governance: Culture, Context and Comparative Theory, Routledge, ISBN 978-1-134-27493-2
- Mukherjee, Prithwindra (2010), Les racines intellectuelles du mouvement d'indépendance de l'Inde (1893-1918), Editions Codex, ISBN 978-2-918783-02-2
- Popplewell, Richard J (1995), Intelligence and Imperial Defence: British Intelligence and the Defence of the Indian Empire 1904-1924, Routledge, ISBN 978-0-7146-4580-3, archived from the original on 26 March 2009
- Puri, Harish K (September–October 1980), "Revolutionary Organization: A Study of the Ghadar Movement", Social Scientist, 9 (2/3): 53–66, doi:10.2307/3516925, JSTOR 3516925
- Radhan, O. P. (2002), Encyclopaedia of Political Parties, Anmol Publications Pvt ltd, ISBN 81-7488-865-9
- Roy, Samaren (1997), M. N. Roy: A Political Biography, Orient Longman, ISBN 81-250-0299-5
- Sen, Sailendra Nath (2010), An Advanced History of Modern India, Macmillan, ISBN 978-0230-32885-3
- Strachan, Hew (2001), The First World War, vol. I: To Arms, Oxford University Press, USA, ISBN 978-0-19-926191-8
