= Annie Larsen affair =

Gun-running plot in the United States during World War I

The Annie Larsen affair was a gun-running plot in the United States during World War I. The plot, involving India's Ghadar Party, the Irish Republican Brotherhood, and the German Foreign office, was a part of the larger so-called "Hindu–German Conspiracy", and it was the prime offence cited in the 1917 Hindu–German Conspiracy Trial, described at the time as the longest and most expensive trial in American legal history.

== Background ==
By 1914, plans for a pan-Indian revolution had been hatched. As World War I broke out, Germany decided to actively support the Ghadar plan. For this, links established between Indian and Irish residents in Germany (including Roger Casement) and the German Foreign office were used to tap into the Indo-Irish network in the United States. In September 1914, the German Chancellor Theobald von Bethmann Hollweg authorised German activity against British India. The German effort was headed by Max von Oppenheim, archaeologist and the head of the newly formed Intelligence Bureau for the East. His mission was to organize the Indian student groups into a cohesive group. Oppenheim also convinced Indian revolutionary Har Dayal of the feasibility of the project and was able to establish contact with the Ghadar Party in the United States. In an October meeting of the Imperial Naval Office, the consulate in San Francisco was tasked to make contact with Ghadar leaders in California. German military attache to the German consulate Wilhelm von Brincken was able to establish contact, through Tarak Nath Das and an intermediary named Charles Lattendorf, with Ram Chandra.

== Arms shipment ==
With the approval of San Francisco German vice-consul E.H. von Schack, arrangements for funds and armaments were secured. Ram Chandra was to receive a monthly payment of $1,000. At the same time $200,000 worth of small arms and ammunition was acquired by the German military attaché Captain Franz von Papen through a Krupp agent by the name of Hans Tauscher. In the meantime, Papen arranged for Joseph McGarrity to make the necessary arrangements for shipping the arms purchase from New York to Galveston via the Mallory Steamship Company, an Irish-American shipping firm. From Galveston the guns were sent by train to San Diego, where they were to be shipped to India via Burma. However, Charles Martinez, a customs official who had arranged the shipment to San Diego, was not told of the true destination, and hired the schooner Annie Larsen. For this purpose, an elaborate deception was hatched to convey the idea that the arms were meant for the warring factions in Mexico. J. Clyde Hizar, a Colorado attorney in charge of placing the arms on board the Annie Larsen, posed as a representative for the Carranza Faction. This ruse was convincing enough to elicit an offer of $15,000 from the rival Villa faction to divert the shipment to a Villa-controlled port.

However, the Annie Larsen was not suitable for a trans-Pacific voyage. Frederick Jebsen, a German reserve naval officer with close connections to the German embassy, arranged for another ship, the SS Maverick, to be purchased under the illusion that it was to be used by the "American-Asiatic Oil Company", a fake oil-trading company, and was to deploy between China and Borneo. The plan was for the Maverick to leave empty from San Pedro around the same time as the Annie Larsen leaves San Diego fully loaded. The two would rendezvous off Socorro Island near Mexico. The Annie Larsen would transfer its shipment to the Maverick which would then proceed towards Southeast Asia. For this purpose, Jebsen established a fake company to hide the true ownership of the ship, taking his attorney Ray Howard as partner. The Maverick received a crew composed of sailors from two German ships interned at San Francisco. An American by the name of John B. Starr-Hunt served as supercargo on the Maverick, and was under orders to scuttle the ship if challenged by Allied warships. The impression at the docks was that the ship was to relieve congestion in the East Indian Coconut industry, in Java and Borneo.

The Annie Larsen sailed for Topolobampo on 8 March 1915 under Captain Paul Schlueter for rendezvous with the SS Maverick. Also placed on board was a person by the name of Walter Page as supercargo. Page's real identity was L. Othmer, the captain of the German bark Atlas, which had earlier been interned by the U.S. government in San Francisco. Page was given complete authority over the ship's movement and he set sail for Socorro Island, off Baja California.

However, at this stage the plan started falling apart. The Maverick, which was in drydock at the time, could not sail for another month. Even during this time, rumours abounded that it was to be used to smuggle arms into Southeast Asia. The ship was searched a number of times by customs and security agents, who only found the ship's empty hold. Immediately before it left, it received an additional crew of five Indian Ghadar activists carrying fake Persian passports. They carried with themselves large amounts of Ghadarite literature, and were tasked by Ram Chandra to establish contacts with Indian revolutionaries and arrange for the arms to be transported inland. However, awaiting the Maverick for nearly a month, the Annie Larsen ran out of fresh water and, without a condenser on board, was forced to head for the mainland of Mexico. Arriving at the rendezvous point, the Maverick was informed of the Annie Larsen's departure by a two-man crew left behind by Page. The Maverick waited for twenty-nine days for the Schooner's return. During this time, it was visited by HMS Kent. The Ghadar agents were forced to burn the revolutionary literature in the boiler room while the Kent's crew searched the ship. A subsequent visit by an American warship also revealed nothing save the ship's empty hold.

The Annie Larsen sailed to Acapulco to replenish its supplies. However, it faced trouble as three of the crew members refused to sail the ship, claiming it was not seaworthy. Captain Sheultzer was able to successfully appeal for help from the USS Yorktown which was in the area. Its contraband cargo was not discovered by the Yorktown's boarding party. Allowed to use the Yorktown's wireless, the German crew were able to notify the German Consulate of their position and of the failed rendezvous. Sailing from Acapulco, the Annie Larsen made for Socorro Island again. However, in adverse weather, this attempt failed as well, and after twenty-two days Scheultzer gave up, choosing to make for the northern port of Hoquiam, Washington.

Returning to San Diego after failing to meet the Annie Larsen, the Maverick was directed by Fred Jebsen to proceed to Hilo, Hawaii, where it was redirected to Johnston Island by the German consulate for a second effort to rendezvous with the Annie Larsen. However, this failed too and it was subsequently directed to Anjer, Java. At Anjer, a German operative named Theodore Helfrichs was instructed to dispose of the ship. However, it was seized by Dutch authorities. Starr-Hunt and four of the Ghadarites attempted to flee in a ship, but were captured by the British cruiser HMS Newcastle. Taken to Singapore, Starr-Hunt confessed his role in the plot.

== Resolving the plot ==
In the United States, the conspiracy was successfully infiltrated by British intelligence through both the Irish, as well as Indian channels. The activities of Ghadar on the Pacific coast were noted by W. C Hopkinson, who had grown up in India and spoke fluent Hindi. In the meantime, through intelligence sources arising from British, Irish, European, and Mexican sources, the Justice Department had a clear picture of the conspiracy and the true purposes of the Maverick and the Annie Larsen. The Home department of the British Indian government had begun the task of actively tracking Indian seditionists on the East Coast as early as 1910. Francis Cunliffe Owen, the officer heading the Home Office agency in New York, had become thoroughly acquainted with George Freeman and Myron Phelps posing as members of the Clan-na-Gael. Owens' efforts were successful in thwarting the SS Moraitis plan. The Ghadar Party was incidentally established after Irish Republicans, sensing infiltration, encouraged an exclusively Indian society. Following this, a number of approaches were adopted, including instituting a "Native" Indian intelligence officer to infiltrate the movement, as well as the use of the famous American Pinkerton's detective agency.

An Irish double agent by the name of Charles Lamb is said to have passed on the majority of the information that compromised the conspiracy and ultimately helped the construction of the prosecution. An Indian operative, codenamed "C" and described most likely to have been Chandra Kanta Chakraverty (later the chief prosecution witness in the trial), also passed on the details of the conspiracy to British and American intelligence. On 29 June 1915, the Annie Larsen was raided at Hoquiam and its contraband cargo seized. However, Page was able to escape and later made for Germany. The Annie Larsen's cargo was sold at an auction despite the German Ambassador Count Johann von Bernstoff's attempts to take possession insisting they were meant for German East Africa. Additionally, some of the plans involving the Indian Berlin Committee leaked out through Czech revolutionaries and spy networks who were in touch with their counterparts in the United States. The American network of the Czech organisation, headed by E. V. Voska, was a counter-espionage network spying on German and Austrian diplomats. Voska, being pro-American, pro-British and anti-German, on learning of the plot from the Czech European network, spoke of it to Tomáš Masaryk, who then passed the information to the American authorities. The Americans informed British intelligence.

== Trial ==
The Hindu–German Conspiracy Trial commenced in the District Court in San Francisco on November 12, 1917, following the uncovering of the Annie Larsen's cargo. One hundred and five people, including the former Consul-General and vice consul, members of the Ghadar Party, and members of the German consulate in San Francisco were tried. The trial lasted from November 20, 1917, to April 24, 1918. The trial was also sensationally notable for the assassination of the chief conspirator Ram Chandra. Chandra was assassinated on the last day of the trial in a packed courtroom by one of his fellow accused, Ram Singh. Singh himself was also immediately shot dead by a United States Marshal. In May 1917, eight Indian nationalists of the Ghadar Party were indicted by a federal grand jury on a charge of conspiracy to form a military enterprise against Britain. The trial in later years has been criticised for being largely a show trial to appease the British government. In addition, the jury during the trial was carefully selected to exclude Irish persons with republican views or associations. The British authorities hoped that the conviction of the Indians would result in their deportation from the United States back to India. However, in the face of strong public support in favor of the Indians, officials of the U.S. Department of Justice chose not to do so.

== Impact on Anglo-American relations ==
By 1916, the majority of the resources of the American department of the British Foreign office were related to the Indian seditionist movement. Before the outbreak of the war, Sir Cecil Spring Rice, the Ambassador to United States at the time of the war, is known to have urged the British Foreign office not to make this a diplomatic issue. Spring Rice's dispatches cite concerns with regards to American tolerance of the Anarchist movements in American soil, the American government's inactions despite concrete knowledge (in Spring Rice's opinion) of the conspiracies, as well as concerns regarding the image of Britain in American public opinion if Britain were seen to persecute oppressed people. Further, Spring Rice was particularly wary of the political commitments of American President Wilson's government, especially given that the Secretary of State William Jennings Bryan had eight years previously written the highly critical pamphlet British Rule in India. This pamphlet had been classified as seditionist by the Indian and Imperial governments.

Following Bryan's departure, the British secretary of state, Robert Crewe-Milnes, attempted to persuade Spring Rice to raise the issue in front of the United States government. American authorities in the Philippines were also more cooperative at this time, and assured Britain they would have foreknowledge of any plans against Hong Kong. Following the conclusion of the Lahore Conspiracy Case trial, and as more evidence of German complicity came to light, Foreign Secretary Edward Grey was forced to override Spring Rice's hesitation; in February 1916, the British government officially presented its concerns regarding the conspiracy and German complicity to the American government. Although the new secretary of state Robert Lansing was initially as uncooperative as Bryan, the first investigations of the conspiracy opened with the raid of the Wall Street office of Wolf von Igel. The papers seized were later presented as evidence in the Hindu–German Conspiracy trial. Much to the chagrin of the British government, however, it was not pursued further at the time.

The issue did precipitate a more general Anglo-American neutrality dispute. This was aggravated by belligerent preventive measures taken by the British far-eastern fleet that threatened the sovereignty of American vessels. In particular, HMS Laurentic seized German and Turkish passengers on the American vessel China at the mouth of the Yangtze, the British government accusing them of planning to foment an armed uprising in India. This incident provoked outrage from the American government, and was followed by a number of incidents including the SS Henry S incident. The US Atlantic Fleet dispatched destroyers to the Philippines. The relations were strained until May 1916, when the British government decided to relax its aggressive policy and seek cooperation with the US. The China prisoners were released that month, but relations did not improve before November that year, with a number of exchanges through the rest of 1916.

The issue was ultimately addressed by William Wiseman, head of British intelligence in the US, who bypassed diplomatic channels to give details of a bomb plot directly to the New York police. This led to the arrest of Chandra Kanta Chuckrevarty. As links became apparent, within the Chuckrevarty papers and the Igel papers, the investigations by federal authorities ultimately expanded to cover the entire conspiracy. The US agreed to pass on evidence so long as Britain did not seek admission of liability for Breaches of Neutrality. At a time that Diplomatic relations with Germany were deteriorating, the Foreign Office directed the Embassy to cooperate with the investigations. These ultimately resolved the Anglo-American diplomatic disputes just as America entered the war.
