= German Plot =

German Plot may refer to:

- Christmas Day Plot, 1915; Indian conspiracy
- German Plot (Ireland), 1918; putative conspiracy
