= Oren (spy) =

- Espionage activity
- Allegiance: Germany

Oren was the codename assigned to a Baltic-German double agent in South-East Asia by British Intelligence during World War I.

== Identity ==
Although his true identity is unknown, he is believed to be a man of Swedish descent. Author Nigel West states that he was a Baltic German.

== Espionage ==
Oren's intelligence passed on to the British Consul in Batavia, W.E. Beckett along with the intelligence passed on by another German agent Vincent Kraft, was instrumental in uncovering parts of the Hindu–German Conspiracy, especially the plans to ship arms to India on board the SS Maverick in June 1915. Oren also passed on information on the operations of Jatindranath Mukherjee's agent Narendranath Bhattacharya with German ministers in South-East Asia, and of Jatin's plans for revolt in the Indian Army in Bengal in August 1915.

Based on Oren's intelligence, the Maverick was seized. Meanwhile in India, police destroyed the underground movement in Calcutta as an unaware Jatin proceeded according to plan to the Bay of Bengal coast in Balasore. He was followed there by Indian police and on 9 September 1915, he and a group of five revolutionaries armed with Mauser pistols made a last stand on the banks of the river Burha Balang. Seriously wounded in a gun battle that lasted seventy five minutes, Jatin died the next day in the town of Balasore.

Oren's true identity was never disclosed by Beckett.
