= Hindu–German Conspiracy =

1914–1917 plan for pan-Indian rebellion against the British Raj during WWI

The Hindu–German Conspiracy^{[note]} was a series of attempts between 1914 and 1917 by Indian nationalist groups to create a pan-Indian rebellion against the British Empire during World War I. This rebellion was formulated between the Indian revolutionary underground and exiled or self-exiled nationalists in the United States. It also involved the Ghadar Party, and in Germany the Indian independence committee in the decade preceding the Great War. The conspiracy began at the start of the war, with extensive support from the German Foreign Office, the German consulate in San Francisco, and some support from Ottoman Turkey and the Irish republican movement. The most prominent plan attempted to foment unrest and trigger a Pan-Indian mutiny in the British Indian Army from Punjab to Singapore. It was to be executed in February 1915, with the aim to overthrow British rule in the Indian subcontinent. The February mutiny was ultimately thwarted when British intelligence infiltrated the Ghadarite movement and arrested key figures. Mutinies in smaller units and garrisons within India were also crushed.

The Indo-German alliance and conspiracy were the target of a worldwide British intelligence effort, which successfully prevented further attempts. American intelligence agencies arrested key figures in the aftermath of the Annie Larsen affair in 1917. The conspiracy resulted in the Lahore conspiracy case trials in India as well as the Hindu–German Conspiracy Trial – at the time the longest and most expensive trial ever held in the United States.

This series of events was pivotal for the Indian independence movement, and became a major factor in reforming the Raj's Indian policy. Similar efforts were made during World War II in Germany and in Japanese-controlled Southeast Asia. Subhas Chandra Bose formed the Indische Legion and the Indian National Army, and in Italy Mohammad Iqbal Shedai formed the Battaglione Azad Hindoustan.

== Background ==
Nationalism had become more and more prominent in India throughout the last decades of the 19th century as a result of the social, economic and political changes instituted in the country through the greater part of the century. The Indian National Congress, founded in 1885, developed as a major platform for loyalists' demands for political liberalization and for increased autonomy. The nationalist movement grew with the founding of underground groups in the 1890s. It became particularly strong, radical and violent in Bengal and in Punjab, along with smaller but nonetheless notable movements in Maharashtra, Madras and other places of South India. In Bengal the revolutionaries often recruited the educated youth of the urban middle-class Bhadralok community that epitomized the "classic" Indian revolutionary, while in Punjab the rural and military society sustained organized violence.

Other related events include:

- the 1915 Singapore Mutiny,
- the Annie Larsen arms plot,
- the Jugantar–German plot,
- the German mission to Kabul,
- by some accounts, the Black Tom explosion in 1916.

Parts of the conspiracy also included efforts to subvert the British Indian Army in the Middle Eastern theatre of World War I.

=== Indian revolutionary underground ===
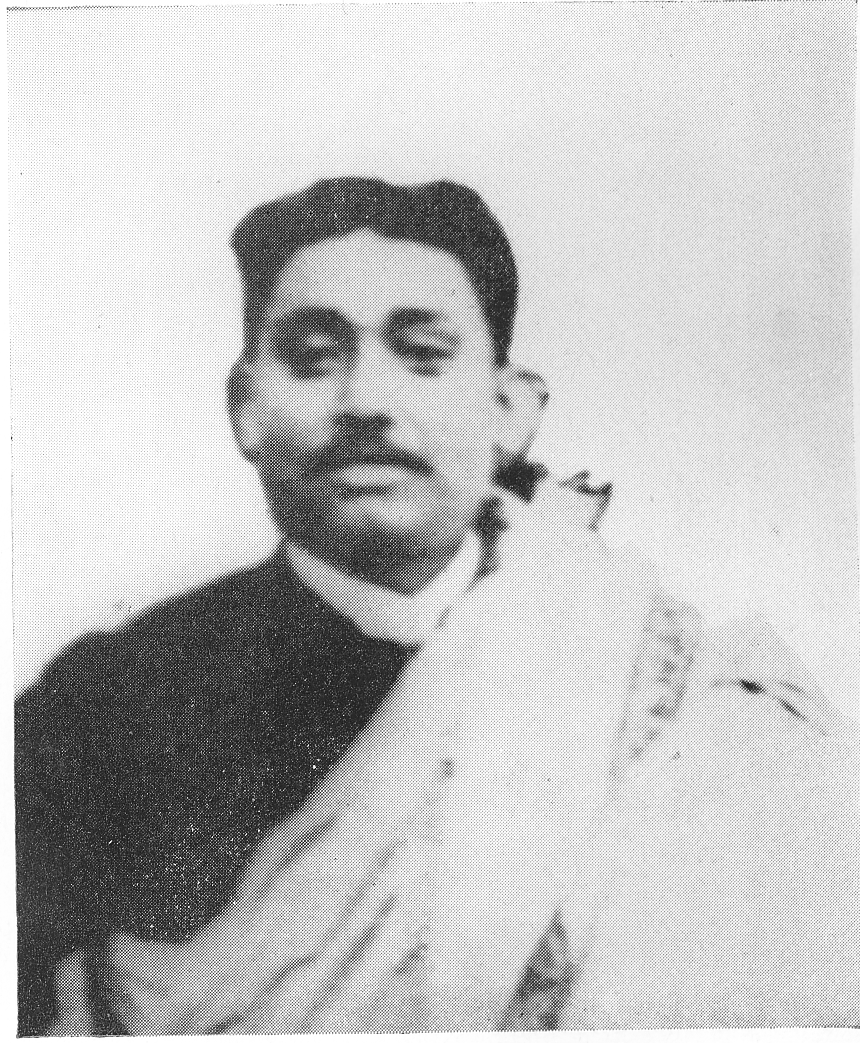
Rash Behari Bose, key leader of the Delhi–Lahore Conspiracy and, later, of the February plot

The controversial 1905 partition of Bengal had a widespread political impact. Acting as a stimulus for radical nationalist opinion in India and abroad, it became a focal issue for Indian revolutionaries. Revolutionary organizations like Jugantar and Anushilan Samiti emerged in the 20th century. Significant events took place, including assassinations and attempted assassinations of civil servants, prominent public figures and Indian informants, including an attempt in 1907 to kill Bengal Lieutenant-Governor Sir Andrew Fraser. Matters came to a head when the 1912 Delhi–Lahore Conspiracy, led by erstwhile Jugantar member Rash Behari Bose, attempted to assassinate the then-Viceroy of India, Charles Hardinge. In the aftermath of this event, the British Indian police made concentrated efforts to destroy the Bengali and Punjabi revolutionary underground. Though the movement came under intense pressure for some time, Rash Behari successfully evaded capture for nearly three years. By the time World War I began in 1914, the revolutionary movement had revived in Punjab and Bengal. In Bengal the movement, with a safe haven in the French base of Chandernagore, had sufficient strength to all but paralyze the state administration.

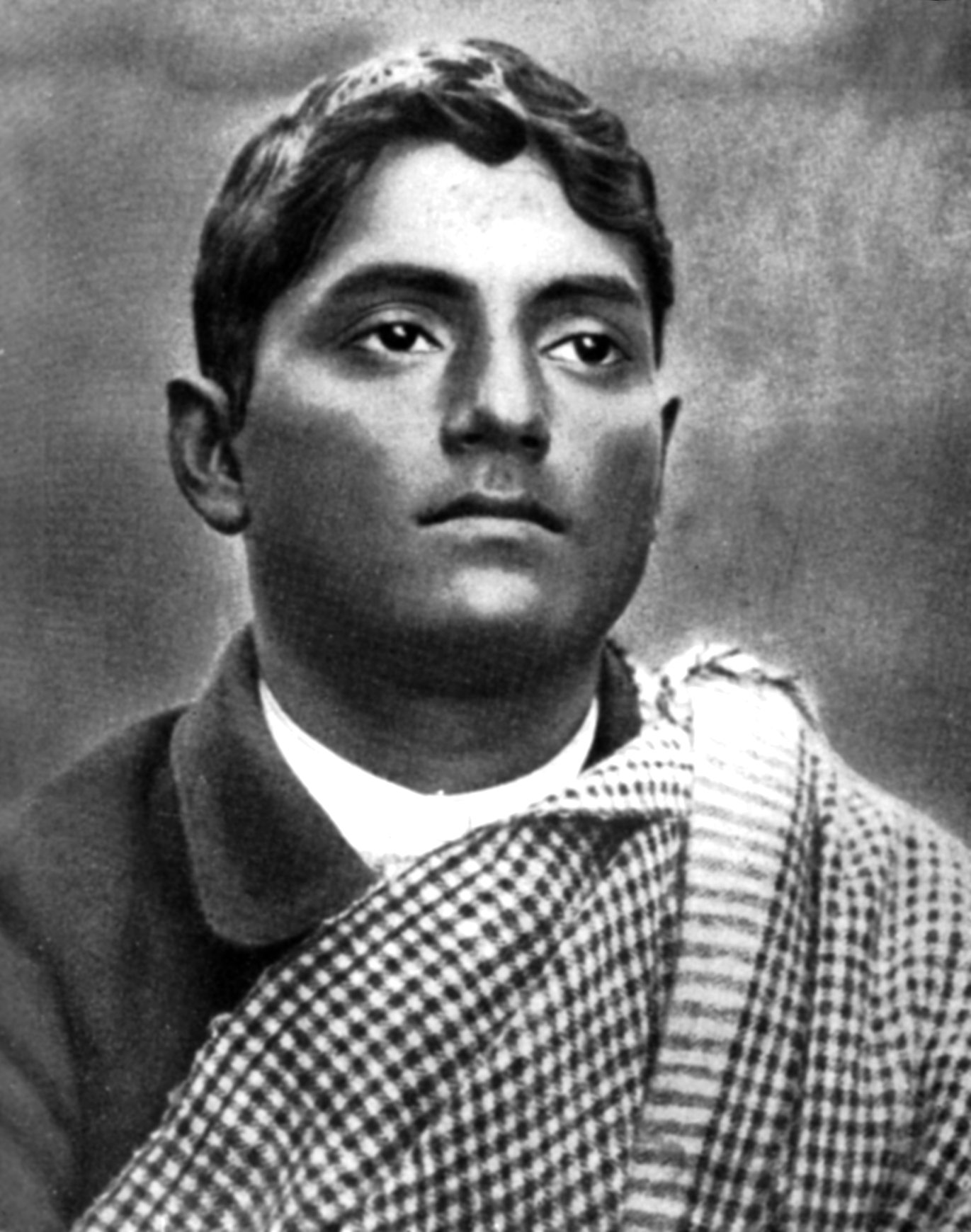
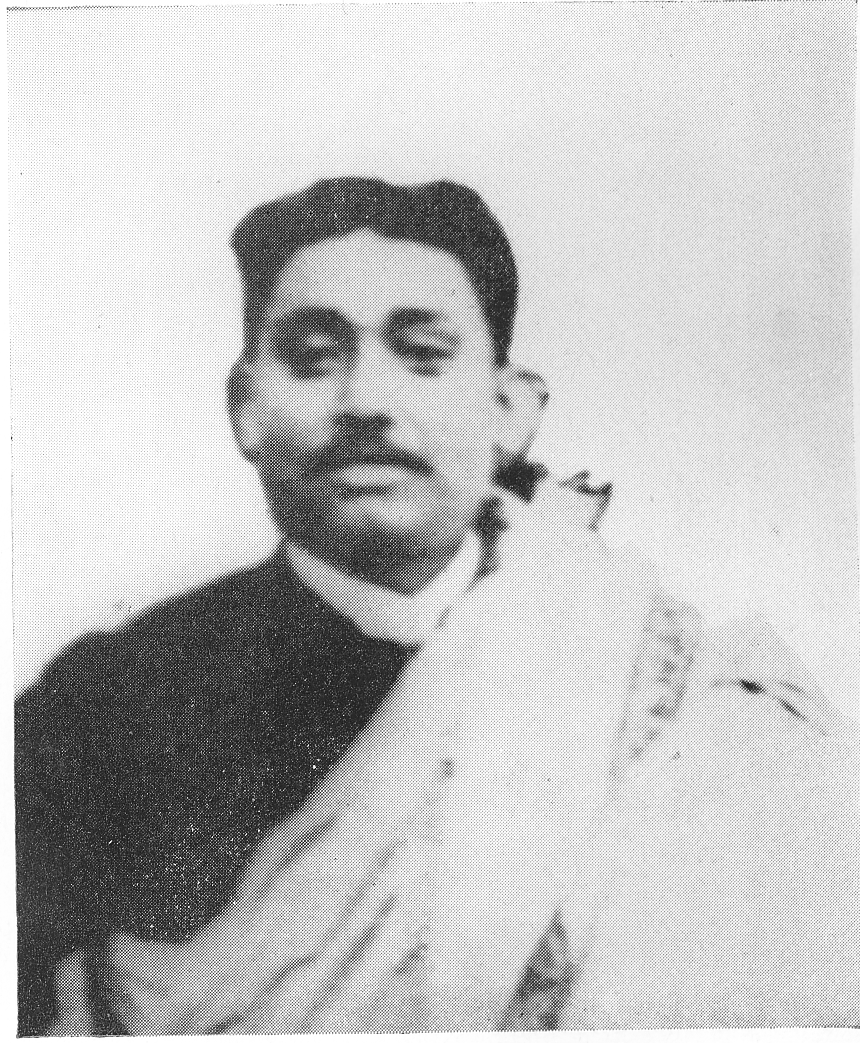
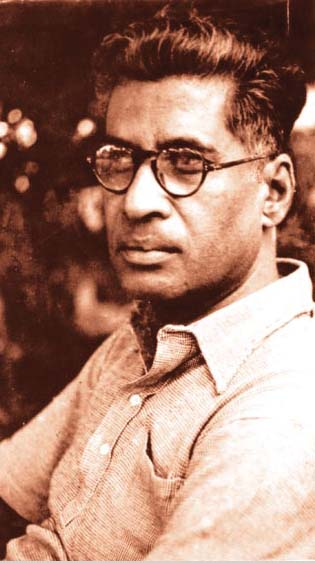
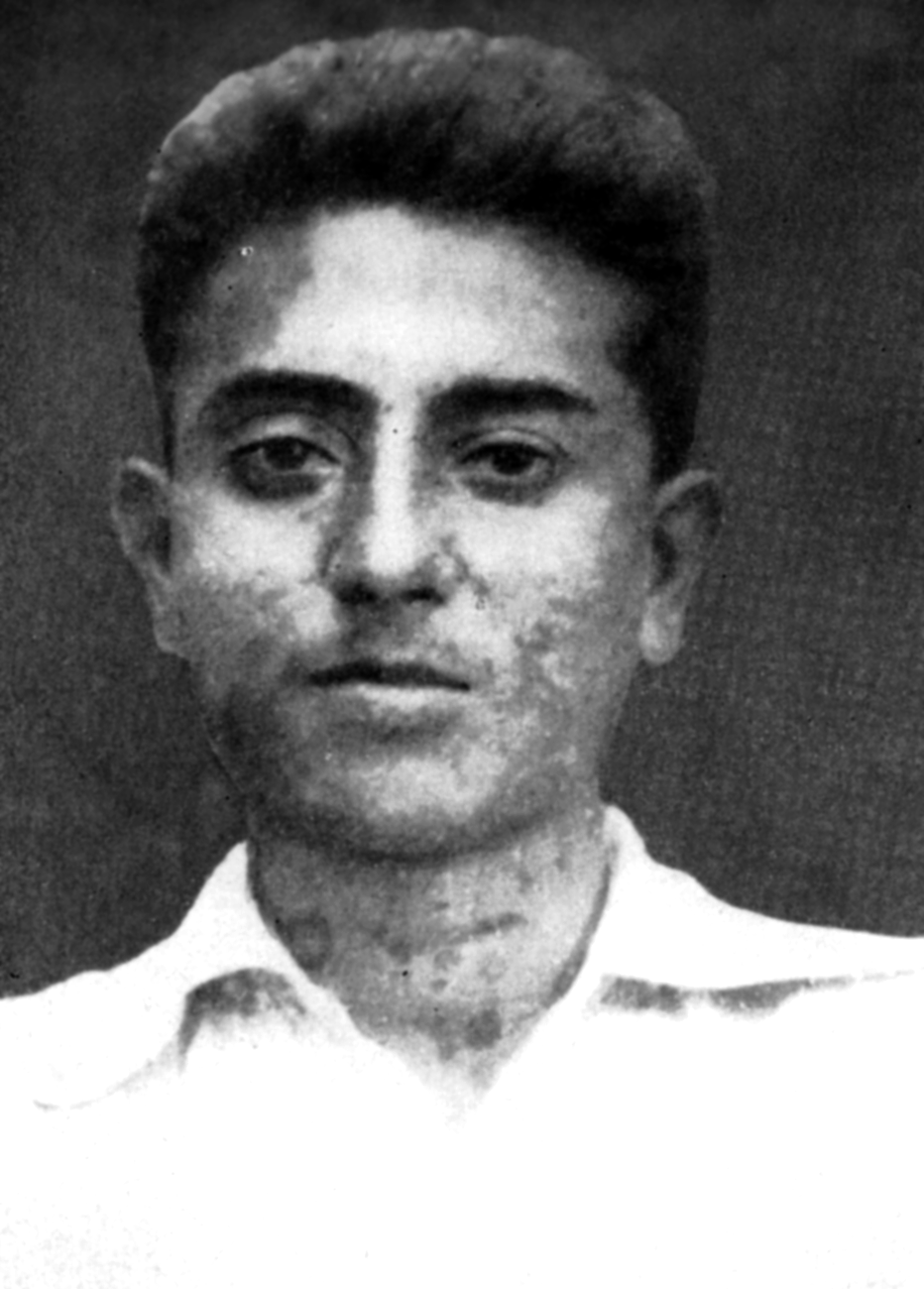
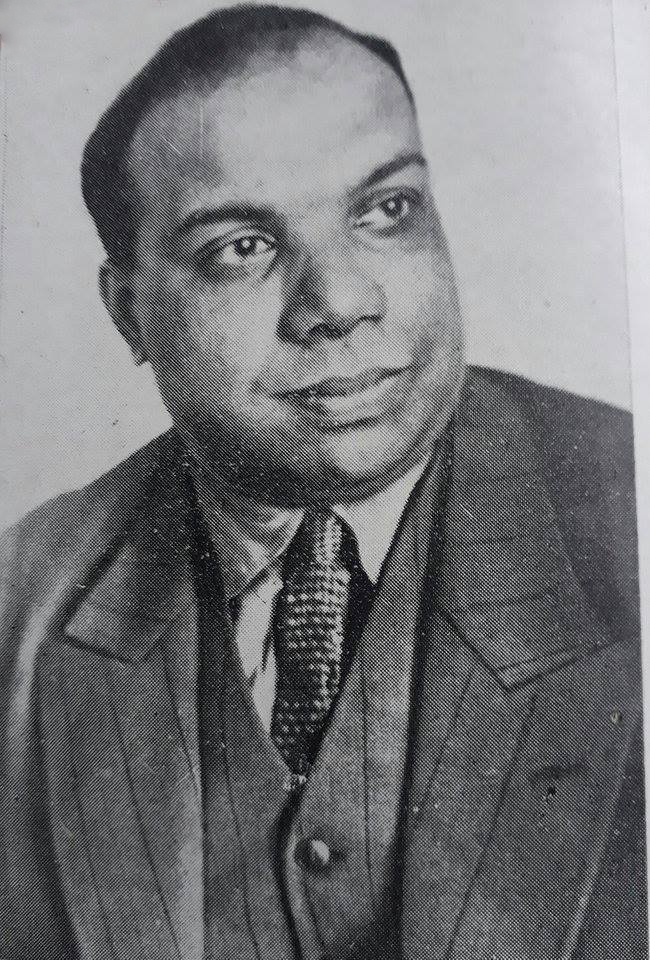
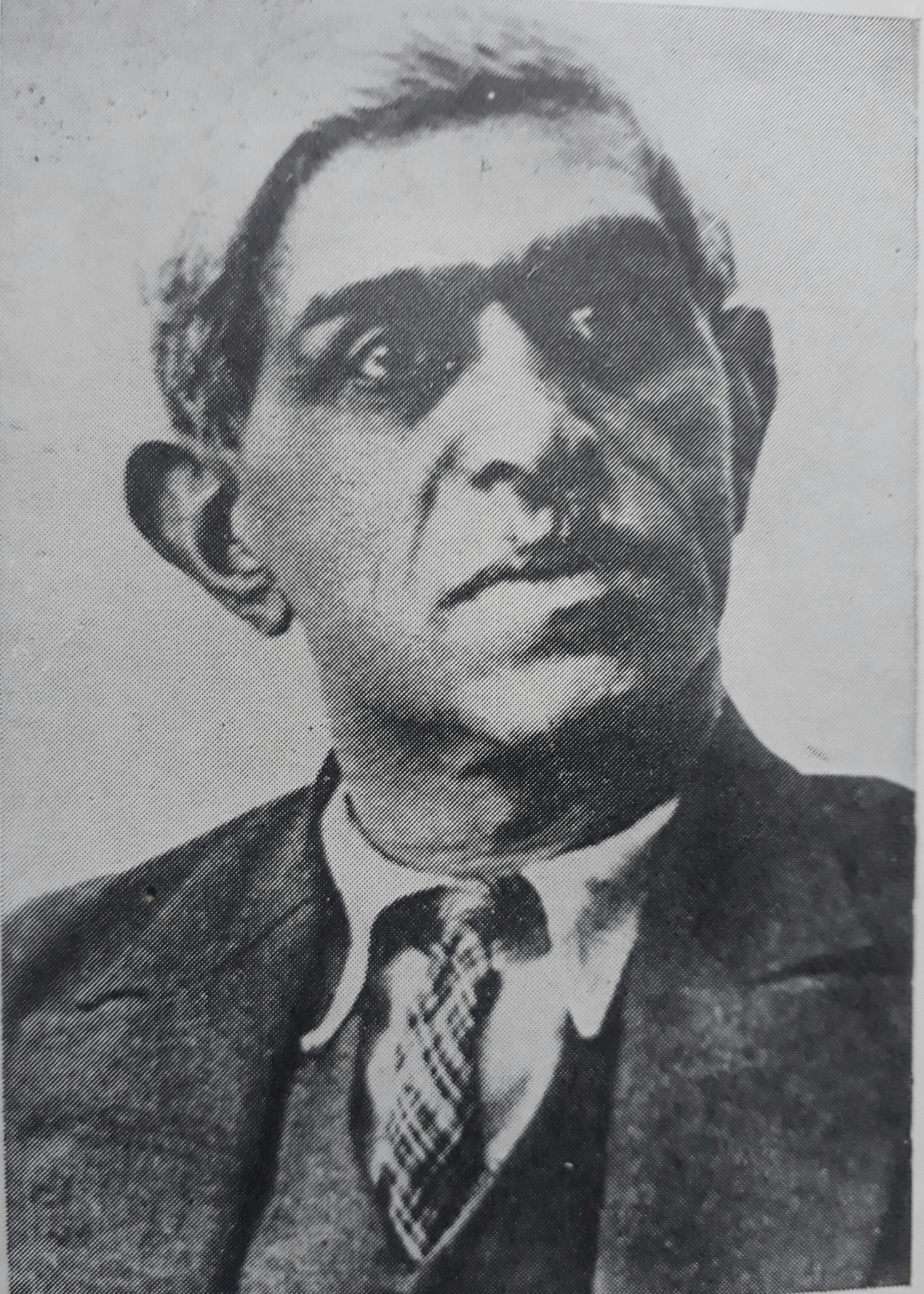
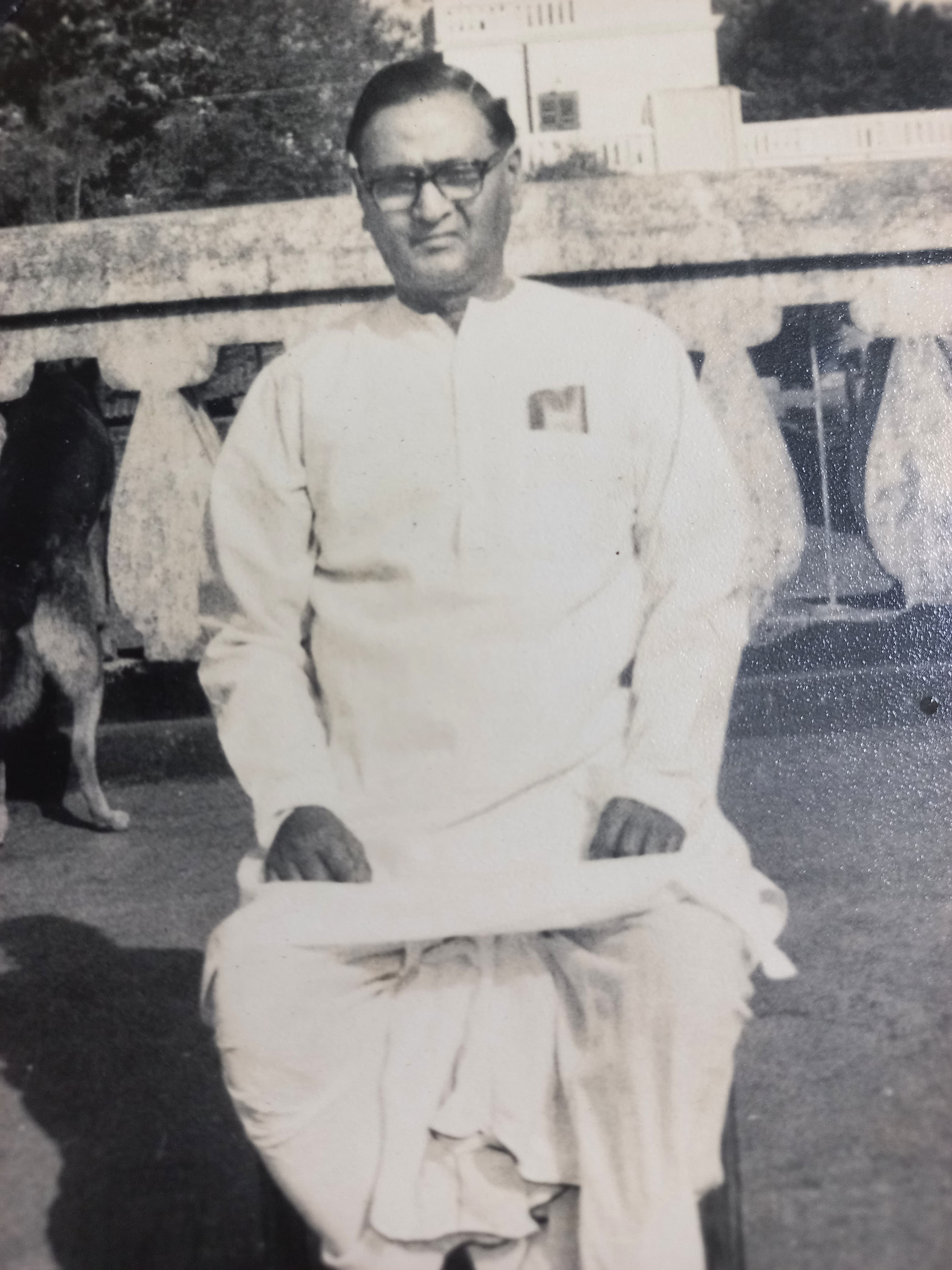
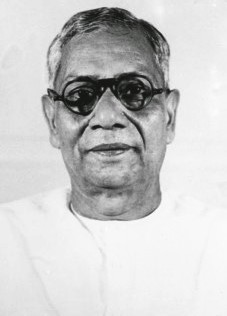
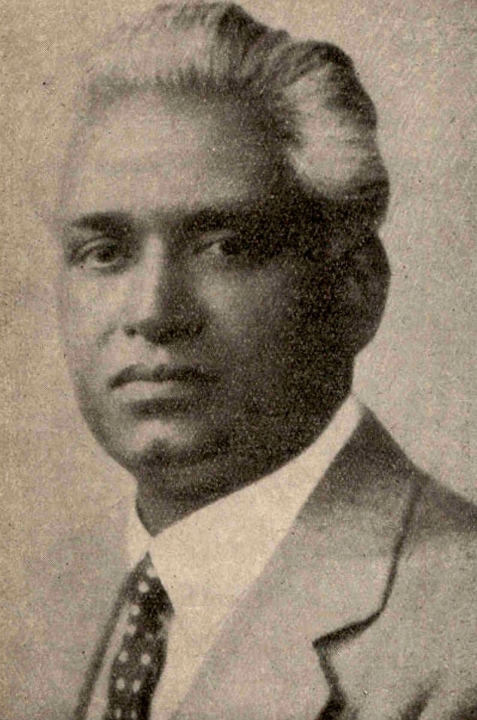
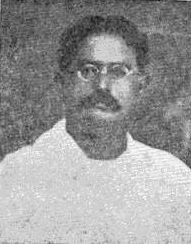
From left to right, top to bottom: The conspirators of Hindu–German Conspiracy from Bengal : Jatin Mukherjee, Rash Behari Bose, Narendranath Bhattacharya alias M. N. Roy, Bholanath Chatterjee, Abani Mukherji, Virendranath Chattopadhyaya, Jadugopal Mukherjee, Bhupati Majumdar,Tarak Nath Das & Atulkrishna Ghosh.

The earliest mention of a conspiracy for armed revolution in India appears in Nixon's Report on Revolutionary Organization, which reported that Jatin Mukherjee (Bagha Jatin) and Naren Bhattacharya had met with the Crown Prince of Germany during the latter's visit to Calcutta in 1912, and received assurances that he would receive arms and ammunition At the same time, an increasingly strong pan-Islamic movement began to develop, mainly in the North and North-West regions of India. At the onset of the war in 1914, members of this movement formed an important element of the conspiracy.

At the time of the partition of Bengal, Shyamji Krishna Varma founded India House in London and received extensive support from notable expatriate Indians including Madam Bhikaji Cama, Lala Lajpat Rai, S. R. Rana, and Dadabhai Naoroji. The organization – ostensibly a residence for Indian students – in reality sought to promote nationalist opinion and pro-independence work. India House drew young radical activists like M. L. Dhingra, V. D. Savarkar, V. N. Chatterjee, M. P. T. Acharya and Lala Har Dayal. It developed links with the revolutionary movement in India and nurtured it with arms, funds and propaganda. Authorities in India banned The Indian Sociologist and other literature published by the House as "seditious". Under V. D. Savarkar's leadership, the House rapidly developed into a centre for intellectual and political activism and a meeting-ground for radical revolutionaries among Indian students in Britain, earning it the moniker "The most dangerous organization outside India" from Valentine Chirol. In 1909 in London M. L. Dhingra fatally shot Sir W. H. Curzon Wyllie, political aide-de-camp to the Secretary of State for India. In the aftermath of the assassination, the Metropolitan Police and the Home Office rapidly suppressed India House. Its leadership fled to Europe and to the United States. Some, like Chatterjee, moved to Germany; Har Dayal and many others moved to Paris.

Organizations founded in the United States and in Japan emulated the example of London's India House. Krishna Varma nurtured close interactions with Turkish and Egyptian nationalists and with Clan na Gael in the United States. The joint efforts of Mohammed Barkatullah, S. L. Joshi and George Freeman founded the Pan-Aryan Association — modelled after Krishna Varma's Indian Home Rule Society — in New York in 1906. Barkatullah himself had become closely associated with Krishna Varma during a previous stay in London, and his subsequent career in Japan put him at the heart of Indian political activities there. Myron Phelp, an acquaintance of Krishna Varma and an admirer of Swami Vivekananda, founded an "India House" in Manhattan, New York, in January 1908. Amidst a growing Indian student population, erstwhile members of the India House in London succeeded in extending the nationalist work across the Atlantic. The Gaelic American reprinted articles from the Indian Sociologist, while liberal press-laws allowed free circulation of the Indian Sociologist. Supporters could ship such nationalist literature and pamphlets freely across the world. New York increasingly became an important centre for the Indian movement, such that Free Hindustan— a political revolutionary journal closely mirroring the Indian Sociologist and the Gaelic American published by Taraknath Das— moved in 1908 from Vancouver and Seattle to New York. Das established extensive collaboration with the Gaelic American with help from George Freeman before it was proscribed in 1910 under British diplomatic pressure. This Irish collaboration with Indian revolutionaries led to some of the early but failed efforts to smuggle arms into India, including a 1908 attempt on board a ship called the SS Moraitis which sailed from New York for the Persian Gulf, before it was searched at Smyrna. The Irish community later provided valuable intelligence, logistics, communication, media, and legal support to the German, Indian, and Irish conspirators. Those involved in this liaison, and later involved in the plot, included major Irish republicans and Irish-American nationalists like John Devoy, Joseph McGarrity, Roger Casement, Éamon de Valera, Peter Yorke, and Larry de Lacey. These pre-war contacts effectively set up a network which the German foreign office tapped into as war began in Europe.

=== Ghadar Party ===
An immigrant Punjabi family in America. c. 1900s

Large-scale Indian immigration to the Pacific coast of North America took place in the 20th-century, especially from Punjab, which faced an economic depression. The Canadian government met this influx with legislation aimed at limiting the entry of South Asians into Canada and at restricting the political rights of those already in the country. The Punjabi community had hitherto been an important loyal force for the British Empire and the Commonwealth. The community had expected that its commitment would be honored with the same welcome and rights which the British and colonial governments extended to British and white immigrants. The restrictive legislation fed growing discontent, protests and anti-colonial sentiments within the community. Faced with increasingly difficult situations, the community began organizing itself into political groups. Many Punjabis also moved to the United States, but they encountered similar political and social problems. Meanwhile, India House and nationalist activism of Indian students had begun declining on the east coast of North America towards 1910, but activity gradually shifted west to San Francisco. The arrival at this time of Har Dayal from Europe bridged the gap between the intellectual agitators in New York and the predominantly Punjabi labor workers and migrants in the west coast, and laid the foundations of the Ghadar movement.

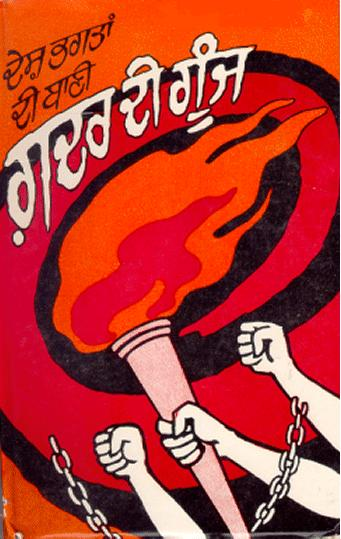
Ghadar di gunj, an early Ghadarite compilation of nationalist and socialist literature, was banned in India in 1913.

The Ghadar Party, initially the 'Pacific Coast Hindustan Association', was formed in 1913 in the United States under the leadership of Har Dayal, with Sohan Singh Bhakna as its president. It drew members from Indian immigrants, largely from Punjab. Many of its members were also from the University of California at Berkeley including Dayal, Tarak Nath Das, Kartar Singh Sarabha and V.G. Pingle. The party quickly gained support from Indian expatriates, especially in the United States, Canada and Asia. Ghadar meetings were held in Los Angeles, Oxford, Vienna, Washington, D.C., and Shanghai.

Ghadar's ultimate goal was to overthrow British colonial authority in India by means of an armed revolution. It viewed the Congress-led mainstream movement for dominion status as modest and its constitutional methods as soft. Ghadar's foremost strategy was to entice Indian soldiers to revolt. To that end, in November 1913 Ghadar established the Yugantar Ashram press in San Francisco. The press produced the Hindustan Ghadar newspaper and other nationalist literature.

Towards the end of 1913, the party established contact with prominent revolutionaries in India, including Rash Behari Bose. An Indian edition of the Hindustan Ghadar essentially espoused the philosophies of anarchism and revolutionary terrorism against British interests in India. Political discontent and violence mounted in Punjab, and Ghadarite publications that reached Bombay from California were deemed seditious and banned by the Raj. These events, compounded by evidence of prior Ghadarite incitement in the Delhi-Lahore Conspiracy of 1912, led the British government to pressure the American State Department to suppress Indian revolutionary activities and Ghadarite literature, which emanated mostly from San Francisco.

=== Germany and the Berlin Committee ===
With the onset of World War I, an Indian revolutionary group called the Berlin Committee (later called the Indian Independence Committee) was formed in Germany. Its chief architects were C. R. Pillai and V. N. Chatterjee. The committee drew members from Indian students and erstwhile members of the India House including Abhinash Bhattacharya, Dr. Abdul Hafiz, Padmanabhan Pillai, A. R. Pillai, M. P. T. Acharya and Gopal Paranjape. Germany had earlier opened the Intelligence Bureau for the East headed by archaeologist and historian Max von Oppenheim. Oppenheim and Arthur Zimmermann, the State Secretary for Foreign Affairs of the German Empire, actively supported the Berlin committee, which had links with Jatin Mukherjee— a Jugantar Party member and at the time one of the leading revolutionary figures in Bengal. The office of the 25-member committee at No.38 Wielandstrasse was accorded full embassy status.

German Chancellor Theobald von Bethmann Hollweg authorized German activity against British India as World War I broke out in September 1914. Germany decided to actively support the Ghadarite plans. Using the links established between Indian and Irish residents in Germany (including Irish nationalist and poet Roger Casement) and the German Foreign Office, Oppenheim tapped into the Indo-Irish network in the United States. Har Dayal helped organise the Ghadar party before his arrest in the United States in 1914. He jumped bail and made his way to Switzerland, leaving the party and its publications in the charge of Ram Chandra Bharadwaj, who became the Ghadar president in 1914. The German consulate in San Francisco was tasked to make contact with Ghadar leaders in California. A naval lieutenant by the name of Wilhelm von Brincken with the help of the Indian nationalist journalist Tarak Nath Das and an intermediary by the name of Charles Lattendorf established links with Bharadwaj. Meanwhile, in Switzerland the Berlin committee was able to convince Har Dayal that organising a revolution in India was feasible.

== Conspiracy ==
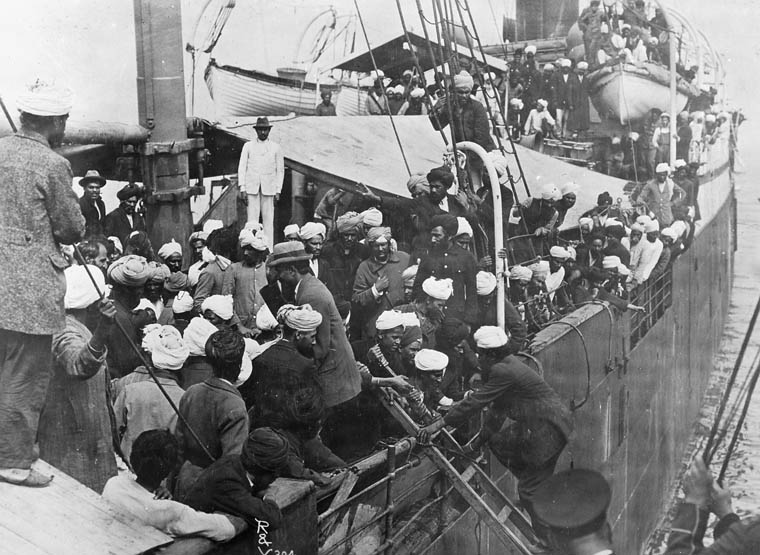
Punjabi Sikhs aboard the Komagata Maru in Vancouver's English Bay, 23 May 1914. The Canadian government banned the passengers from landing in Canada and the ship was forced to return to India. The events surrounding the Komagata Maru incident served as a catalyst for the Ghadarite cause.

In May 1914, the Canadian government refused to allow the 400 Indian passengers of the ship Komagata Maru to disembark at Vancouver. The voyage had been planned by Gurdit Singh Sandhu as an attempt to circumvent Canadian exclusion laws that effectively prevented Indian immigration. Before the ship reached Vancouver, German radio announced its approach, and British Columbian authorities prepared to prevent the passengers from entering Canada. The ship was escorted out of Vancouver by the protected cruiser HMCS Rainbow and returned to India.

The incident became a focal point for the Indian community in Canada, which rallied in support of the passengers and against the government's policies. After a two-month legal battle, 24 of the passengers were allowed to immigrate. On reaching Calcutta, the passengers were detained under the Defence of India Act at Budge Budge by the British Indian government, which tried to forcibly transport them to Punjab. This caused rioting at Budge Budge, resulting in fatalities on both sides. Ghadar leaders like Barkatullah and Tarak Nath Das used the inflammatory passions surrounding the Komagata Maru event as a rallying point and successfully brought many disaffected Indians in North America into the party's fold.

The British Indian Army, meanwhile, contributed significantly to the Allied war effort in World War I. Consequently, a reduced force, an estimated 15,000 troops in late 1914, was stationed in India. It was in this scenario that concrete plans for organising uprisings in India were made.

In September 1913, a Ghadarite named Mathra Singh visited Shanghai to promote the nationalist cause amongst Indians there, followed by a visit to India in January 1914, when Singh circulated Ghadar literature amongst Indian soldiers through clandestine sources before leaving for Hong Kong. Singh reported that the situation in India was favorable for revolution.

By October 1914, many Ghadarites had returned to India and were assigned tasks like contacting Indian revolutionaries and organizations, spreading propaganda and literature, and arranging to get arms into the country. The first group of 60 Ghadarites led by Jawala Singh left San Francisco for Canton aboard the steamship Korea on 29 August. They were to sail on to India, where they would be provided with arms to organise a revolt. At Canton, more Indians joined, and the group, now numbering about 150, sailed for Calcutta on a Japanese vessel. They were to be joined by more Ghadarites arriving in smaller groups. During September and October, about 300 Indians left for India in various ships like the SS Siberia, Chinyo Maru, China, Manchuria, SS Tenyo Maru, SS Mongolia, and SS Shinyō Maru. Although the Korea's party was uncovered and arrested on their arrival at Calcutta, a successful underground network was established between the United States and India, through Shanghai, Swatow, and Siam. Tehl Singh, the Ghadar operative in Shanghai, is believed to have spent $30,000 on helping revolutionaries to get into India. The Ghadarites in India were able to establish contact with sympathisers in the British Indian Army and build networks with underground revolutionary groups.

=== East Asia ===
Efforts had begun as early as 1911 to procure arms and smuggle them into India. When a clear idea of the conspiracy emerged, more earnest and elaborate plans were made to obtain arms and to enlist international support. Herambalal Gupta, who had arrived in the United States in 1914 at the Berlin Committee's directive, took over the leadership of American wing of the conspiracy after the failure of the SS Korea mission. Gupta immediately began efforts to obtain men and arms. While men were in plentiful supply with more and more Indians coming forward to join the Ghadarite cause, obtaining arms for the uprising proved to be more difficult.

The revolutionaries started negotiations with the Chinese government through James Dietrich, who held Sun Yat-sen's power of attorney, to buy a million rifles. However, the deal fell through when they realized that the weapons offered were obsolete flintlocks and muzzle loaders. From China, Gupta went to Japan to try to procure arms and to enlist Japanese support for the Indian independence movement. However, he was forced into hiding within 48 hours when he came to know that the Japanese authorities planned to hand him over to the British. Later reports indicated he was protected at this time by Toyama Mitsuru, right-wing political leader and founder of the Genyosha nationalist secret society.

The Indian Nobel laureate Rabindranath Tagore, a strong supporter of Pan-Asianism, met Japanese premier Count Terauchi and Count Okuma, a former premier, in an attempt to enlist support for the Ghadarite movement. Tarak Nath Das urged Japan to align with Germany, on the grounds that American war preparation could actually be directed against Japan. Later in 1915, Abani Mukherji— a Jugantar activist and associate of Rash Behari Bose— is also known to have tried unsuccessfully to arrange for arms from Japan.The ascendancy of Li Yuanhong to Chinese Presidency in 1916 led to negotiations reopening through his former private secretary, who resided in the United States at the time. In exchange for allowing arms shipments to India through China, China was offered German military assistance and the rights to 10% of any material shipped to India via China. The negotiations were ultimately unsuccessful due to Sun Yat-sen's opposition to an alliance with Germany.

=== Europe and United States ===
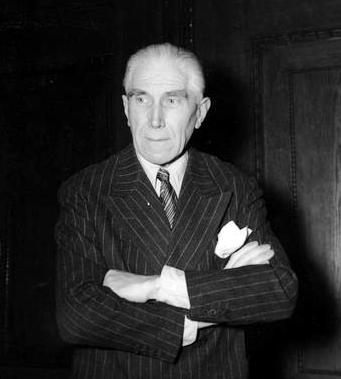
Franz von Papen, later the Chancellor of Germany briefly before Hitler's rise to power. Papen was key in organizing the arms shipments.

The Indian nationalists then in Paris had, with Egyptian revolutionaries, made plans to assassinate Lord Kitchener as early as 1911, but did not implement them. After the war began, this plan was revived, and Har Dayal's close associate Gobind Behari Lal visited Liverpool in March 1915 from New York to put this plan in action. He may also have intended at this time to bomb the docks in Liverpool. However, these plans ultimately failed. Chattopadhyaya also attempted at this time to revive links with the remnants of India House that survived in London, and through Swiss, German and English sympathisers then resident in Britain. Among them were Meta Brunner (a Swiss woman), Vishna Dube (an Indian man) and his common law German wife Anna Brandt, and Hilda Howsin (an English woman in Yorkshire). Chattopadhyaya's letters were however traced by the censors, leading to the arrest of the cell members. Among other plans that were considered at this time were conspiracies in June 1915 to assassinate Foreign Secretary Sir Edward Grey and War Minister Lord Kitchener. In addition, they also intended to target French President Raymond Poincaré and Prime Minister René Viviani, King Victor Emmanuel III of Italy and his prime minister Antonio Salandra. These plans were coordinated with the Italian anarchists, with explosives manufactured in Italy. Barkatullah, by now in Europe and working with the Berlin Committee, arranged for these explosives to be sent to the German consulate in Zurich, from where they were expected to be taken charge of by an Italian anarchist named Bertoni. However, British intelligence was able to infiltrate this plot, and successfully pressed Swiss police to expel Abdul Hafiz.

In the United States, an elaborate plan and arrangement was made to ship arms from the country and from the Far East through Shanghai, Batavia, Bangkok and Burma. Even while Herambalal Gupta was on his mission in China and Japan, other plans were explored to ship arms from the United States and East Asia. The German high command decided early on that assistance to the Indian groups would be pointless unless given on a substantial scale. In October 1914, German Vice Consul E.H von Schack in San Francisco approved the arrangements for the funds and armaments. The German military attaché Captain Franz von Papen acquired $200,000 worth of small arms and ammunition through Krupp agents, and arranged for its shipment to India through San Diego, Java, and Burma. The arsenal included 8,080 Springfield rifles of Spanish–American War vintage, 2,400 Springfield carbines, 410 Hotchkiss repeating rifles, 4,000,000 cartridges, 500 Colt revolvers with 100,000 cartridges, and 250 Mauser pistols along with ammunition. The schooner Annie Larsen and the sailing ship SS Henry S were hired to ship the arms out of the United States and transfer it to the SS Maverick. The ownership of ships were hidden under a massive smokescreen involving fake companies and oil business in south-east Asia. For the arms shipment itself, a successful cover was set up to lead British agents to believe that the arms were for the warring factions of the Mexican Civil War. This ruse was successful enough that the rival Villa faction offered $15,000 to divert the shipment to a Villa-controlled port.

Although the shipment was meant to supply the mutiny planned for February 1915, it was not dispatched until June. By then, the conspiracy had been uncovered in India, and its major leaders had been arrested or gone into hiding. The shipment itself failed when disastrous co-ordination prevented a successful rendezvous off Socorro Island with the Maverick. The plot had already been infiltrated by British intelligence through Indian and Irish agents linked closely with the conspiracy. Upon her return to Hoquiam, Washington after several failed attempts, the cargo of the Annie Larsen was seized by US customs. The cargo was sold at auction despite German Ambassador Count Johann von Bernstoff's attempts to take possession, insisting it was meant for German East Africa. The Hindu–German Conspiracy Trial opened in 1917 in the United States on charges of gun running and at the time was one of the lengthiest and most expensive trials in American legal history. Franz von Papen attempted to sabotage rail lines in Canada and destroy the Welland Canal. He also attempted to supply rifles and dynamite to Sikhs in British Columbia for blasting railway bridges. These plots in Canada did not materialise. Among other events in the United States that have been linked to the conspiracy is the Black Tom explosion when, on the night of 30 July 1916, saboteurs blew up nearly 2 million tons of arms and ammunition at the Black Tom terminal at New York harbour, awaiting shipment in support of the British war effort. Although blamed solely on German agents at the time, later investigations by the Directorate of Naval Intelligence in the aftermath of the Annie Larsen incident unearthed links between the Black Tom explosion and Franz von Papen, the Irish movement, the Indian movement as well as Communist elements active in the United States.

=== Ghadar Mutiny ===
By the start of 1915, many Ghadarites (nearly 8,000 in the Punjab province alone by some estimates) had returned to India. However, they were not assigned a central leadership and begun their work on an ad hoc basis. Although some were rounded up by the police on suspicion, many remained at large and began establishing contacts with garrisons in major cities like Lahore, Ferozepur and Rawalpindi. Various plans had been made to attack the military arsenal at Mian Meer, near Lahore and initiate a general uprising on 15 November 1914. In another plan, a group of Sikh soldiers, the manjha jatha, planned to start a mutiny in the 23rd Cavalry at the Lahore cantonment on 26 November. A further plan called for a mutiny to start on 30 November from Ferozepur under Nidham Singh. In Bengal, the Jugantar, through Jatin Mukherjee, established contacts with the garrison at Fort William in Calcutta. In August 1914, Mukherjee's group had seized a large consignment of guns and ammunition from the Rodda company, a major gun manufacturing firm in India. In December 1914, several politically motivated armed robberies to obtain funds were carried out in Calcutta. Mukherjee kept in touch with Rash Behari Bose through Kartar Singh and V. G. Pingle. These rebellious acts, which were until then organised separately by different groups, were brought into a common umbrella under the leadership of Rash Behari Bose in North India, V. G. Pingle in Maharashtra, and Sachindranath Sanyal in Benares. A plan was made for a unified general uprising, with the date set for 21 February 1915.

=== February 1915 ===
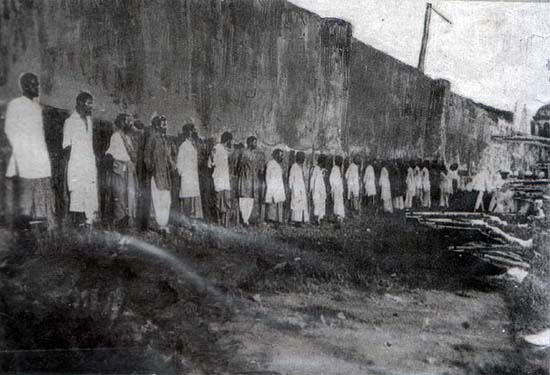
The public executions of convicted mutineers at Outram Road, Singapore, c. March 1915

In India, unaware of the delayed shipment and confident of being able to rally the Indian sepoy, the plot for the mutiny took its final shape. Under the plans, the 23rd Cavalry in Punjab was to seize weapons and kill their officers while on roll call on 21 February. This was to be followed by mutiny in the 26th Punjab, which was to be the signal for the uprising to begin, resulting in an advance on Delhi and Lahore. The Bengal cell was to look for the Punjab Mail entering the Howrah Station the next day (which would have been cancelled if Punjab was seized) and was to strike immediately. However, Punjab CID successfully infiltrated the conspiracy at the last moment through a sepoy named Kirpal Singh. Sensing that their plans had been compromised, D-Day was brought forward to 19 February, but even these plans found their way to the intelligence. Plans for revolt by the 130th Baluchi Regiment at Rangoon on 21 January were thwarted. Attempted revolts in the 26th Punjab, 7th Rajput, 130th Baluch, 24th Jat Artillery and other regiments were suppressed. Mutinies in Firozpur, Lahore, and Agra were also suppressed and many key leaders of the conspiracy were arrested, although some managed to escape or evade arrest. A last-ditch attempt was made by Kartar Singh and V. G. Pingle to trigger a mutiny in the 12th Cavalry regiment at Meerut. Kartar Singh escaped from Lahore, but was arrested in Varanasi, and V. G. Pingle was apprehended in Meerut. Mass arrests followed as the Ghadarites were rounded up in Punjab and the Central Provinces. Rash Behari Bose escaped from Lahore and in May 1915 fled to Japan. Other leaders, including Giani Pritam Singh, Swami Satyananda Puri and others fled to Thailand.

On 15 February, the 5th Light Infantry stationed at Singapore was among the few units to mutiny successfully. Nearly eight hundred and fifty of its troops mutinied on the afternoon of the 15th, along with nearly a hundred men of the Malay States Guides. This mutiny lasted almost seven days, and resulted in the deaths of 47 British soldiers and local civilians. The mutineers also released the interned crew of the SMS Emden, who were asked by the mutineers to join them but refused and actually took up arms and defended the barracks after the mutineers had left (sheltering some British refugees as well) until the prison camp was relieved. The mutiny was suppressed only after French, Russian and Japanese ships arrived with reinforcements. Of 200 people tried at Singapore, 47 mutineers were shot in public executions, and the rest were transported for life to East Africa, or given jail terms ranging between seven and twenty years. In all, 800 mutineers were either shot, imprisoned or exiled. Some historians, including Hew Strachan, argue that although Ghadar agents operated within the Singapore unit, the mutiny was isolated and not linked to the conspiracy. Others deem this as instigated by the Silk Letter Movement which became intricately related to the Ghadarite conspiracy.

=== Christmas Day Plot ===
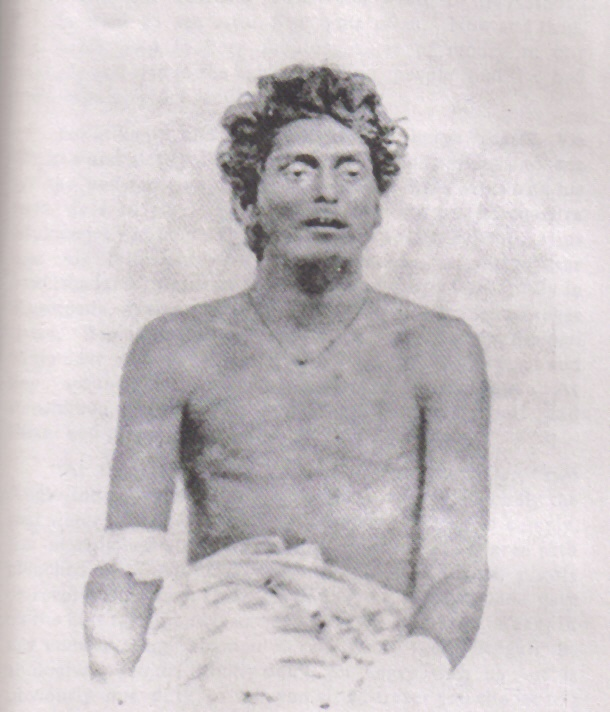
Bagha Jatin, wounded after his final battle at the banks of Burha Balang, off Balasore. His enterprise was deemed one of the most significant threats to British India in autumn 1915.

In April 1915, unaware of the failure of the Annie Larsen plan, Papen arranged, through Krupp's American representative Hans Tauscher, a second shipment of arms, consisting of 7,300 Springfield rifles, 1,930 pistols, 10 Gatling guns, and nearly 3,000,000 cartridges. The arms were to be shipped in mid June to Surabaya in the East Indies on the Holland American steamship SS Djember. However, the intelligence network operated by Courtenay Bennett, the Consul General to New York, was able to trace the cargo to Tauscher in New York and passed the information on to the company, thwarting these plans as well. In the meantime, even after the February plot had been scuttled, the plans for an uprising continued in Bengal through the Jugantar cohort under Jatin Mukherjee (Bagha Jatin). German agents in Thailand and Burma, most prominently Emil and Theodor Helferrich— brothers of the German Finance minister Karl Helfferich— established links with Jugantar through Jitendranath Lahiri in March that year. In April, Jatin's chief lieutenant Narendranath Bhattacharya met with the Helfferichs and was informed of the expected arrival of the Maverick with arms. Although these were originally intended for Ghadar use, the Berlin Committee modified the plans, to have arms shipped into India by the eastern coast of India, through Hatia on the Chittagong coast, Raimangal in the Sundarbans and Balasore in Orissa, instead of Karachi as originally decided. From the coast of the Bay of Bengal, these would be collected by Jatin's group. The date of insurrection was fixed for Christmas Day 1915, earning the name "The Christmas Day Plot". Jatin estimated that he would be able to win over the 14th Rajput Regiment in Calcutta and cut the line to Madras at Balasore and thus take control of Bengal. Jugantar also received funds (estimated to be Rs 33,000 between June and August 1915) from the Helfferich brothers through a fictitious firm in Calcutta. However, it was at this time that the details of the Maverick and Jugantar plans were leaked to Beckett, the British Consul at Batavia, by a defecting Baltic-German agent under the alias "Oren". The Maverick was seized, while in India, police destroyed the underground movement in Calcutta as an unaware Jatin proceeded according to plan to the Bay of Bengal coast in Balasore. He was followed there by Indian police and on 9 September 1915, he and a group of five revolutionaries armed with Mauser pistols made a last stand on the banks of the river Burhablanga. Seriously wounded in a gun battle that lasted seventy five minutes, Jatin died the next day in Balasore.

To provide the Bengal group enough time to capture Calcutta and to prevent reinforcements from being rushed in, a mutiny coinciding with Jugantar's Christmas Day insurrection was planned for Burma with arms smuggled in from neutral Thailand. Thailand (Siam) was a strong base for the Ghadarites, and plans for rebellion in Burma (which was a part of British India at the time) had been proposed by the Ghadar party as early as October 1914, which called for Burma to be used as a base for subsequent advance into India. This Siam-Burma plan was finally concluded in January 1915. Ghadarites from branches in China and United States, including Atma Ram, Thakar Singh, and Banta Singh from Shanghai and Santokh Singh and Bhagwan Singh from San Francisco, attempted to infiltrate Burma Military Police in Thailand, which was composed mostly of Sikhs and Punjabi Muslims. Early in 1915, Atma Ram had also visited Calcutta and Punjab and linked up with the revolutionary underground there, including Jugantar. Herambalal Gupta and the German consul at Chicago arranged to have German operatives George Paul Boehm, Henry Schult, and Albert Wehde sent to Siam through Manila with the purpose of training the Indians. Santokh Singh returned to Shanghai tasked to send two expeditions, one to reach the Indian border via Yunnan and the other to penetrate upper Burma and join with revolutionary elements there. The Germans, while in Manila, also attempted to transfer the arms cargo of two German ships, the Sachsen and the Suevia, to Siam in a schooner seeking refuge at Manila harbour. However, US customs stopped these attempts. In the meantime, with the help of the German Consul to Thailand Remy, the Ghadarite established a training headquarters in the jungles near the Thai-Burma border for Ghadarites arriving from China and Canada. German Consul General at Shanghai, Knipping, sent three officers of the Peking Embassy Guard for training and in addition arranged for a Norwegian agent in Swatow to smuggle arms through. However, the Thai Police high command, which was largely British, discovered these plans and Indian police infiltrated the plot through an Indian secret agent who was revealed the details by the Austrian chargé d'affaires. Thailand, although officially neutral, was allied closely with Britain and British India. On 21 July, the newly arrived British Minister Herbert Dering presented Foreign Minister Prince Devawongse with the request for arrest and extradition of Ghadarites identified by the Indian agent, ultimately resulting in the arrest of leading Ghadarites in August. Only a single raid into Burma was launched by six Ghadarites, who were captured and later hanged.

Also to coincide with the proposed Jugantar insurrection in Calcutta was a planned raid on the penal colony in the Andaman Islands with a German volunteer force raised from East Indies. The raid would release the political prisoners, helping to raise an expeditionary Indian force that would threaten the Indian coast. The plan was proposed by Vincent Kraft, a German planter in Batavia who had been wounded fighting in France. It was approved by the foreign office on 14 May 1915, after consultation with the Indian committee, and the raid was planned for Christmas Day 1915 by a force of nearly one hundred Germans. Knipping made plans for shipping arms to the Andaman islands. However, Vincent Kraft was a double agent, and leaked details of Knipping's plans to British intelligence. His own bogus plans for the raid were in the meantime revealed to Beckett by "Oren", but given the successive failures of the Indo-German plans, the plans for the operations were abandoned on the recommendations of both the Berlin Committee and Knipping.

=== Afghanistan ===
Mahendra Pratap (centre) at the head of the Mission with the German and Turkish delegates in Kabul, 1915. Seated to his right is Werner Otto von Hentig.

Efforts were directed at drawing Afghanistan into the war on the side of the Central Powers, which it was hoped would incite a nationalist or pan-Islamic uprising in India and destabilise the British recruiting grounds in Punjab and across India. After Russia's defeat in the 1905 Russo-Japanese war, her influence had declined, and it was Afghanistan that was at the time seen by Britain as the only power in the sub-continent capable of directly threatening India.

In the spring of 1915, an Indo-German expedition was sent to Afghanistan via the overland route through Persia. Led by the exiled Indian prince Raja Mahendra Pratap, this mission sought to invite the Afghan Emir Habibullah Khan to break with Britain, declare his independence, join the war on the Central side, and invade British India. It managed to evade the considerable Anglo-Russian efforts that were directed at intercepting it in Mesopotamia and in the Persian deserts before it reached Afghanistan in August 1915. In Afghanistan, it was joined in Kabul by members of the pan-Islamic group Darul Uloom Deoband led by Maulana Ubaidullah Sindhi. This group had left India for Kabul at the beginning of the war while another group under Mahmud al-Hasan made its way to Hijaz, where they hoped to seek support from the Afghan Emir, the Ottoman Empire and Imperial Germany for a pan-Islamic insurrection beginning in the tribal belt of north-west India. The Indo-German mission pressed Emir Habibullah to break from his neutral stance and open diplomatic relations with Germany, eventually hoping to rally the Emir to the German war effort. Habibullah Khan vacillated on the mission's proposals through much of the winter of 1915, hoping to maintain his neutral stance till the course of the war offered a concrete picture. However, the mission opened at this time secret negotiations with the pro-German elements in the Emir's court and advisory council, including his brother Nasrullah Khan and son Amanullah Khan. It found support among Afghan intellectuals, religious leaders and the Afghan press which rallied with increasingly anti-British and pro-Central articles. By 1916 the Raj was forced to intercept copies of the Afghan newspaper Siraj al Akhbar sent to India. It raised to the Emir a threat of a coup d'état in his country and unrest among his tribesmen, who were beginning to see him as subservient to British authority even as Turkey called for a pan-Islamic Jihad.

In December 1915, the Indian members founded the Provisional Government of India, which it was hoped would weigh on Habibullah's advisory council to aid India and force the Emir's hands. In January 1916, the Emir approved a draft treaty with Germany to buy time. However, the Central campaign in the Middle East faltered at around this time, ending hopes that an overland route through Persia could be secured for aid and assistance to Afghanistan. The German members of the mission left Afghanistan in June 1916, ending the German intrigues in the country. Nonetheless, Mahendra Pratap and his Provisional Government stayed behind, attempting to establish links with Japan, Republican China and Tsarist Russia. After the Russian revolution, Pratap opened negotiations with the Soviet Union, visiting Trotsky in Red Petrograd in 1918, and Lenin in Moscow in 1919 and he visited the Kaiser in Berlin in 1918. He pressed for a joint Soviet-German offensive through Afghanistan into India. This was considered by the Soviets for some time after the 1919 coup in Afghanistan in which Amanullah Khan was instated as the Emir and the third Anglo-Afghan war began. Pratap may also have influenced the "Kalmyk Project", a Soviet plan to invade India through Tibet and the Himalayan buffer states.

=== Middle East ===
Another arm of the conspiracy was directed at the Indian troops who were serving in Middle East. In the Middle Eastern theatre, members of the Berlin Committee, including Har Dayal and M. P. T. Acharya, were sent on missions to Baghdad and Syria in the summer of 1915, tasked with infiltrating the Indian Expeditionary Force in southern Mesopotamia and Egypt and to attempt to assassinate British officers. The Indian effort was divided into two groups, one consisting of a Bengali revolutionary P.N. Dutt (alias Dawood Ali Khan) and Pandurang Khankoje. This group arrived at Bushire, where they worked with Wilhelm Wassmuss and distributed nationalist and revolutionary literature among Indian troops in Mesopotamia and Persia. The other group, working with Egyptian nationalists, attempted to block the Suez Canal. These groups carried out successful clandestine work in spreading nationalist literature and propaganda amongst the Indian troops in Mesopotamia, and on one occasion even bombed an officer's mess. Nationalist work also extended at this time to recruiting Indian prisoners of war in Constantinople, Bushire, and Kut-al-Amara. M. P. T. Acharya's own works were directed at forming the Indian National Volunteer Corps with the help of Indian civilians in Turkey, and to recruiting Indian prisoners of war. He is further known to have worked along with Wilhelm Wassmuss in Bushire amongst Indian troops. The efforts were, however, ultimately hampered by differences between the Berlin committee members who were predominantly Hindus, and Indian revolutionaries already in Turkey who were largely Muslims. Further, the Egyptian nationalists distrusted the Berlin Committee, which was seen by the former as a German instrument.

Nonetheless, in culmination of these efforts, Indian prisoners of war from France, Turkey, Germany, and Mesopotamia—especially Basra, Bushehr, and from Kut al Amara—were recruited, raising the Indian Volunteer Corps that fought with Turkish forces on many fronts. The Deobandis, led by Amba Prasad Sufi, attempted to organise incursions to the western border of India from Persia, through Balochistan, to Punjab. Amba Prasad was joined during the war by Kedar Nath Sondhi, Rishikesh Letha and Amin Chaudhry. These Indian troops were involved in the capture of the frontier city of Karman, Uzbekistan and the detention of the British consul there, and also successfully harassed Percy Sykes' Persian campaign against the Baluchi and Persian tribal chiefs who were aided by the Germans. The Aga Khan's brother was killed while fighting the rebels. The rebels also successfully harassed British forces in Sistan in Afghanistan, confining them to Karamshir in Balochistan, and later moving towards Karachi. Some reports indicate they took control of the coastal towns of Gawador and Dawar. The Baluchi chief of Bampur, having declared his independence from British rule, also joined the Ghadarites. But the war in Europe turned for the worse for Turkey and Baghdad was captured by the British forces. The Ghadarite forces, their supply lines starved, were finally dislodged. They retreated to regroup at Shiraz, where they were finally defeated after a bitter fight during the siege of Shiraz. Amba Prasad Sufi was killed in this battle, but the Ghadarites carried on guerrilla warfare along with Iranian partisans until 1919. By the end of 1917, divisions had begun appearing between the Ghadar Party in America on the one hand, and the Berlin Committee and the German high command on the other. Reports from German agents working with Ghadarites in Southeast Asia and the United States clearly indicated to the European wing a significant element of disorganisation, as well as unrealism in gauging public mood and support within the Ghadarite organisation. The failure of the February plot, the lack of bases in Southeast Asia following China's participation in the war in 1917, and the problems of supporting a Southeast Asian operation through the sea stemmed the plans significantly. Infiltration by British agents, change in American attitude and stance, and the changing fortunes of the war meant the massive conspiracy for revolution within India never succeeded.

== Counter-intelligence ==
British intelligence began to note and track outlines and nascent ideas of the conspiracy as early as 1911. Incidents like the Delhi-Lahore Conspiracy and the Komagata Maru incident had already alerted the Criminal Investigation Department (CID) of the existence of a large-scale network and plans for pan-Indian militant unrest. Measures were taken which focussed on Bengal—the seat of the most intense revolutionary terrorism at the time—and on Punjab, which was uncovered as a strong and militant base in the wake of Komagata Maru. Har Dayal's extant group was found to have strong links with Rash Behari Bose, and were "cleaned up" in the wake of the Delhi bomb case.

=== In Asia ===
At the outbreak of the war, Punjab CID sent teams to Hong Kong to intercept and infiltrate the returning Ghadarites, who often made little effort to hide their plans and objectives. These teams were successful in uncovering details of the full scale of the conspiracy, and in discovering Har Dayal's whereabouts. Immigrants returning to India were double checked against a list of revolutionaries.

In Punjab, the CID, although aware of possible plans for unrest, was not successful in infiltrating the conspiracy for the mutiny until February 1915. A dedicated force was formed, headed by the Chief of Punjab CID, and including amongst its members Liaqat Hayat Khan (later head of Punjab CID himself). In February that year, the CID was successful in recruiting the services of Kirpal Singh to infiltrate the plan. Singh, who had a Ghadarite cousin serving in the 23rd Cavalry, was able to infiltrate the leadership, being assigned to work in his cousin's regiment. Singh was soon under suspicion of being a spy, but was able to pass on the information regarding the date and scale of the uprising to British Indian intelligence. As the date for the mutiny approached, a desperate Rash Behari Bose brought forward the mutiny day to the evening of 19 February, which was discovered by Kirpal Singh on the very day. No attempts were made by the Ghadarites to restrain him, and he rushed to inform Liaqat Hayat Khan of the change of plans. Ordered back to his station to signal when the revolutionaries had assembled, Singh was detained by the would-be mutineers, but managed to escape under the cover of answering the call of nature.

The role of German or Baltic-German double-agents, especially the agent named "Oren", was also important in infiltrating and preempting the plans for autumn rebellions in Bengal in 1915 and in as scuttling Bagha Jatin's winter plans that year. Another source, the German double agent Vincent Kraft, a planter from Batavia, passed information about arms shipments from Shanghai to British agents after being captured. Maps of the Bengal coast were found on Kraft when he was initially arrested and he volunteered the information that these were the intended landing sites for German arms. Kraft later fled through Mexico to Japan where he was last known to be at the end of the war. Later efforts by Mahendra Pratap's Provisional Government in Kabul were also compromised by Herambalal Gupta after he defected in 1918 and passed on information to Indian intelligence.

=== Europe and the Middle East ===
By the time the war broke out, the Indian Political Intelligence Office, headed by John Wallinger, had expanded into Europe. In scale this office was larger than those operated by the British War Office, approaching the European intelligence network of the Secret Service Bureau. This network already had agents in Switzerland against possible German intrigues. After the outbreak of the war Wallinger, under the guise of an officer of the British General Headquarters, proceeded to France where he operated from Paris, working with the French political police, the Sûreté. Among Wallinger's recruits in the network was Somerset Maugham, who was recruited in 1915 and used his cover as an author to visit Geneva without Swiss interference.

Among other enterprises, the European intelligence network attempted to eliminate some of the Indian leaders in Europe. A British agent named Donald Gullick was dispatched to assassinate Virendranath Chattopadhyaya while the latter was on his way to Geneva to meet Mahendra Pratap to offer him Kaiser Wilhelm II's invitation. It is said that Somerset Maugham based several of his stories on his first-hand experiences, modelling the character of John Ashenden after himself and Chandra Lal after Virendranath. The short story "Giulia Lazzari" is a blend of Gullick's attempts to assassinate Virendranath and Mata Hari's story. Winston Churchill reportedly advised Maugham to burn 14 other stories.

The Czech revolutionary network in Europe also had a role in uncovering Bagha Jatin's plans. The network was in touch with the members in the United States, and may have also been aware of and involved in the uncovering of the earlier plots. The American network, headed by E. V. Voska, was a counter-espionage network of nearly 80 members who, as Habsburg subjects, were presumed to support Germany, but were involved in spying on German and Austrian diplomats. Voska had begun working with Guy Gaunt, who headed Courtenay Bennett's intelligence network, at the outbreak of the war and on learning of the plot from the Czech European network, passed on the information to Gaunt and to Tomáš Masaryk who further passed on the information the American authorities.

In the Middle East, British counter-intelligence was directed at preserving the loyalty of the Indian sepoy in the face of Turkish propaganda and the concept of The Caliph's Jihad, while a particularly significant effort was directed at intercepting the Kabul Mission. The East Persian Cordon was established in July 1915 in the Sistan province of Persia to prevent the Germans from crossing into Afghanistan, and to protect British supply caravans in Sarhad from Damani, Reki and Kurdish Baluchi tribal raiders who may have been tempted by German gold. Among the commanders of the Sistan force was Reginald Dyer who led it between March and October 1916.

=== United States ===
In the United States, the conspiracy was successfully infiltrated by British intelligence through Irish and Indian channels. The activities of the Ghadar on the Pacific coast were noted by William C. Hopkinson, who was born and raised in India and spoke fluent Hindi. Initially Hopkinson had been despatched from Calcutta to keep the Indian Police informed about the doings of Taraknath Das. The Home department of the British Indian government had begun the task of actively tracking Indian seditionists on the East Coast as early as 1910.

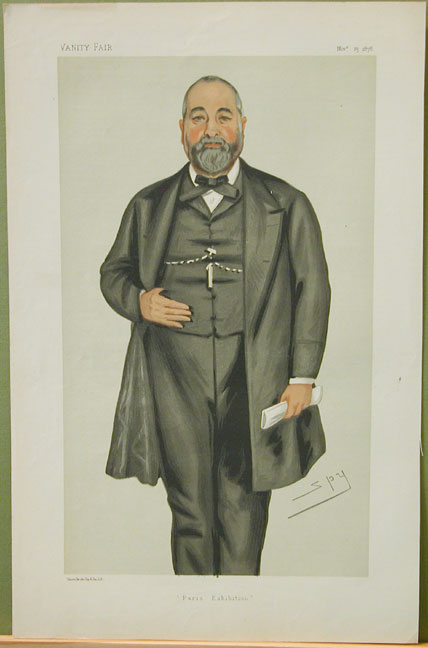
Francis Cunliffe-Owen

Francis Cunliffe Owen, the officer heading the Home Office agency in New York, had become thoroughly acquainted with George Freeman alias Fitzgerald and Myron Phelps, the famous New York advocate, as members of the Clan-na-Gael. Owens' efforts were successful in thwarting the SS Moraitis plan. The Ghadar Party was incidentally established after Irish Republicans, sensing infiltration, encouraged formation of an exclusively Indian society.

Following this, several approaches were adopted, including infiltration through an Indian national named Bela Singh who successfully set up a network of agents passing on information to Hopkinson, and through the use of the famous American Pinkerton's detective agency. Bela Singh was later murdered in India in the 1930s. Hopkinson was assassinated in a Vancouver courthouse by a Ghadarite named Mewa Singh, in October, 1914. Charles Lamb, an Irish double agent, is said to have passed on the majority of the information that compromised the Annie Larsen affair, and ultimately helped the construction of the prosecution. An Indian operative, codenamed "C" and described most likely to have been the adventurous Chandra Kanta Chakravarty (later the chief prosecution witness in the trial), also passed on the details of the conspiracy to British and American intelligence.

== Trials ==
The conspiracy led to several trials in India, most famous among them the Lahore Conspiracy trial, which opened in Lahore in April 1915 in the aftermath of the failed February mutiny. Other trials included the Benares, Shimla, Delhi, and Ferozepur conspiracy cases, and the trials of those arrested at Budge Budge. At Lahore, a special tribunal was constituted under the Defence of India Act 1915 and a total of 291 conspirators were put on trial. Of these 42 were awarded the death sentence, 114 transported for life, and 93 awarded varying terms of imprisonment. Several of these were sent to the Cellular Jail in the Andaman Islands. Forty two defendants in the trial were acquitted. The Lahore trial directly linked the plans made in United States and the February mutiny plot. Following the conclusion of the trial, diplomatic efforts to destroy the Indian revolutionary movement in the United States and to bring its members to trial increased considerably.

In the United States, the Hindu–German Conspiracy Trial commenced in the District Court in San Francisco on 12 November 1917 following the uncovering of the Annie Larsen affair. One hundred and five people participated, including members of the Ghadar Party, the former German Consul-General and Vice-Consul, and other members of staff of the German consulate in San Francisco. The trial itself lasted from 20 November 1917 to 24 April 1918. The last day of the trial was notable for the sensational assassination in a packed courtroom of the chief accused, Ram Chandra, by a fellow defendant, Ram Singh, who believed he was a spy for the British. Singh himself was immediately shot dead by a US Marshal.

In May 1917, a group of Indian nationalists of the Ghadar Party were indicted by a federal grand jury on a charge of conspiracy to form a military enterprise against Britain. In later years the proceedings were criticised as being largely a show trial designed to appease the British government. The jury during the trial was carefully selected to exclude any Irish person with republican views or associations. The trial lasted from November 20, 1917, to April 24, 1918, and resulted in the convictions of 29 people, including 14 Indian nationalists. British colonial authorities hoped the conviction of the Indians would result in their deportation back to India. Had the nationalists been deported to India, they would've faced much harsher sentences, including execution. In contrast to the mass executions in India, the Indian nationalists convicted in the San Francisco trial received prison terms ranged from 30 days to 22 months, as they faced far less serious charges of violating U.S. neutrality laws.

Strong public support in favour of the Indians, especially the revived Anglophobic sentiments following the provisions of the Treaty of Versailles which were perceived as being overtly favorable towards Britain, allowed the Ghadarite movement to be revived despite British concerns.

== Impact ==
The conspiracy had a significant impact on Britain's policies, both within the empire and in international relations. The outlines and plans for the nascent ideas of the conspiracy were noted and tracked by British intelligence as early as 1911. Alarmed at the agile organisation, which repeatedly reformed in different parts of the country despite being subdued in others, the chief of Indian Intelligence Sir Charles Cleveland was forced to warn that the idea and attempts at pan-Indian revolutions were spreading through India "like some hidden fire". A massive, concerted, and coordinated effort was required to subdue the movement. Attempts were made in 1914 to prevent the naturalisation of Tarak Nath Das as an American citizen, while successful pressure was applied to have Har Dayal interned.

=== Political impact ===
The conspiracy, an important set of events in the Indian independence movement, according to the British Indian government's own evaluation at the time, as well as those of several contemporary and modern historians, and it was one of the significant threats faced by the Raj in the second decade of the 20th century.

Amid the British war effort and the threat from the militant movement in India, the British passed the Defence of India Act 1915. Michael O'Dwyer, then the Lieutenant Governor of Punjab, was among the strongest proponents of the Act, largely due to the Ghadarite movement. It was also a factor that guided British political concessions and Whitehall's India Policy during and after World War I, including the passage of Montagu–Chelmsford Reforms which initiated the first round of political reform in the Indian subcontinent in 1917. The events of the conspiracy during World War I, the presence of Pratap's Kabul mission in Afghanistan and its possible links to the Soviet Union, and a still-active revolutionary movement especially in Punjab and Bengal (as well as worsening civil unrest throughout India) led to the appointment of a Sedition committee in 1918 chaired by Sidney Rowlatt, an English judge. It was tasked to evaluate German and Bolshevik links to the militant movement in India, especially in Punjab and Bengal. On the recommendations of the committee, the Rowlatt Act, an extension of the Defence of India Act 1915, was enforced in India.

The events that followed the passage of the Rowlatt Act in 1919 were also influenced by the conspiracy. At the time, British Indian Army troops were returning from the battlefields of Europe and Mesopotamia to an economic depression in India. The attempted mutinies in 1915 and the Lahore conspiracy trials still had the public's attention. News of young Mohajirs who had fought on behalf of the Turkish Caliphate and later in the ranks of the Red Army during the Russian Civil War had also begun to reach India. The Russian Revolution had also cast its long shadow into India. It was at this time that Mahatma Gandhi, until then relatively unknown on the Indian political scene, began to emerge as a mass leader.

Ominously, in 1919, the Third Anglo-Afghan War began in the wake of Amir Habibullah's assassination and institution of Amanullah in a system blatantly influenced by the Kabul mission. In addition, in India, Gandhi's call for protest against the Rowlatt Act achieved an unprecedented response of furious unrest and protests. The situation, especially in Punjab, was deteriorating rapidly, with disruptions of rail, telegraph and communication systems. The movement was at its peak before the end of the first week of April, with some recording that "practically the whole of Lahore was on the streets, the immense crowd that passed through Anarkali was estimated to be around 20,000." In Amritsar, over 5,000 people gathered at Jallianwala Bagh. This situation deteriorated perceptibly over the next few days. Michael O'Dwyer is said to have been of the firm belief that these were the early and ill-concealed signs of a conspiracy for a coordinated uprising around May, on the lines of the 1857 revolt, at a time when the British would have withdrawn to the hills for the summer. The Jallianwala Bagh massacre, as well as responses before and after it, was the result of a concerted plan of response from the Punjab administration to suppress such a conspiracy. James Houssemayne Du Boulay is said to have ascribed a direct relationship between the fear of a Ghadarite uprising in the midst of an increasingly tense situation in Punjab, and the British response that ended in the massacre.

Lastly, British efforts to downplay and disguise the nature and impact of the revolutionary movement at this time also resulted in a policy designed to strengthen the moderate movement in India, which ultimately saw Gandhi's rise in the Indian movement.

=== International relations ===
The conspiracy influenced several aspects of Great Britain's international relations, most of all Anglo-American relations during the war, as well as, to some extent, Anglo-Chinese relations. After the war, it also influenced Anglo-Japanese relations.

At the start of the war, the American government's refusal to check the Indian seditionist movement was a major concern for the British government. By 1916, a majority of the resources of the American department of the British Foreign Office were related to the Indian seditionist movement. Before the outbreak of the war, the political commitments of the Woodrow Wilson government (especially of Secretary of State William Jennings Bryan who, eight years previously, had authored "British Rule in India", a highly critical pamphlet, that was classified as seditionist by the Indian and Imperial governments) and the political fallouts of the perception of British persecution of oppressed people prevented then-ambassador Cecil Spring Rice from pressing the issue diplomatically. After Robert Lansing replaced Bryan as Secretary of State in 1916, Secretary of State for India Marquess of Crewe and Foreign Secretary Edward Grey forced Spring Rice to raise the issue, and in February the evidence obtained in the Lahore Conspiracy trial were presented to the American government. The first investigations were opened in America with the raid of the Wall Street office of Wolf von Igel, which resulted in seizures of papers that were later presented as evidence in the Hindu–German Conspiracy Trial. However, a perceptibly slow and reluctant American investigation triggered an intense neutrality dispute through 1916, aggravated by belligerent preventive measures of the British Far-Eastern fleet on the high seas that threatened the sovereignty of American vessels. German and Turkish passengers were seized from the American vessel China by HMS Laurentic at the mouth of the Yangtze River. Several incidents followed, including the SS Henry S, which were defended by the British government on grounds that the seized ship planned to foment an armed uprising in India. These drew strong responses from the US government, prompting the US Atlantic Fleet to dispatch destroyers to the Pacific to protect the sovereignty of American vessels. Authorities in the Philippines were more cooperative, which assured Britain of knowledge of any plans against Hong Kong. The strained relations were relaxed in May 1916 when the Britain released the China prisoners and relaxed its aggressive policy seeking co-operation with the United States. However, diplomatic exchanges and relations did not improve before November that year.

The conspiracy issue was ultimately addressed by William G. E. Wiseman, head of British intelligence in the United States, when he passed details of a bomb plot directly to the New York Police bypassing diplomatic channels. This led to the arrest of Chandra Kanta Chuckrevarty. As the links between Chuckervarty's papers and the Igel papers became apparent, investigations by federal authorities expanded to cover the entire conspiracy. Ultimately, the United States agreed to forward evidence so long as Britain did not seek admission of liability for breaches of neutrality. At a time that diplomatic relations with Germany were deteriorating, the British Foreign Office directed its embassy to co-operate with the investigations resolving the Anglo-American diplomatic disputes just as the United States entered the war.

Through 1915–1916, China and Indonesia were the major bases for the conspirators, and significant efforts were made by the British government to coax China into the war to attempt to control the German and Ghadar intrigues. This would also allow free purchase of arms from China for the Entente powers. However, Yuan's proposals for bringing China into the war were against Japanese interests and gains from the war. This, along with Japanese support for Sun Yat-Sen and rebels in southern China laid the foundations for deterioration of Anglo-Japanese relations as early as 1916. After the end of the Great War, Japan increasingly became a haven for radical Indian nationalists in exile, who were protected by patriotic Japanese societies. Notable among these were Rash Behari Bose, Tarak Nath Das, and A. M. Sahay. The protections offered to these nationalists, most notably by Toyama Mitsuru's Black Dragon Society, effectively prevented British efforts to repatriate them and became a major policy concern.

=== Ghadar Party and IIC ===
The IIC was formally disbanded in November 1918. Most of its members became closely associated with communism and the Soviet Union. Bhupendranath Dutta and Virendranath Chattopadhyay alias Chatto arrived in Moscow in 1920. Narendranath Bhattacharya, under a new identity of M. N. Roy, was among the first Indian communists and made a memorable speech in the second congress of the Communist International that rejected Leninist views and foreshadowed Maoist peasant movements. Chatto himself was in Berlin until 1932 as the general secretary of the League Against Imperialism and was able to convince Jawaharlal Nehru to affiliate the Indian National Congress with the league in 1927. He later fled Nazi Germany for the Soviet Union but disappeared in 1937 under Joseph Stalin's Great Purge.

The Ghadar Party, suppressed during the war, revived itself in 1920 and openly declared its communist beliefs. Although sidelined in California, it remained relatively stronger in East Asia, where it allied itself with the Chinese Communist Party.

=== World War II ===
Although the conspiracy failed during World War I, the movement being suppressed at the time and several of its key leaders hanged or incarcerated, several prominent Ghadarites also managed to flee India to Japan and Thailand. The concept of a revolutionary movement for independence also found a revival amongst later generation Indian leaders, most notably Subhas Chandra Bose who, towards the mid-1930s, began calling for a more radical approach towards colonial domination. During World War II, several of these leaders were instrumental in seeking Axis support to revive such a concept. Bose himself, from the very beginning of World War II, actively evaluated the concept of revolutionary movement against the Raj, interacting with Japan and subsequently escaping to Germany to raise an Indian armed force, the Indische Legion, to fight in India against Britain. He later returned to Southeast Asia to take charge of the Indian National Army which was formed following the labour of exiled nationalists, efforts from within Japan to revive a similar concept, and the direction and leadership of people like Mohan Singh, Giani Pritam Singh, and Rash Behari Bose. The most famous of these saw the formation of the Indian Independence League, the Indian National Army and ultimately the Arzi Hukumat-e-Azad Hind in Southeast Asia.

== Commemoration ==
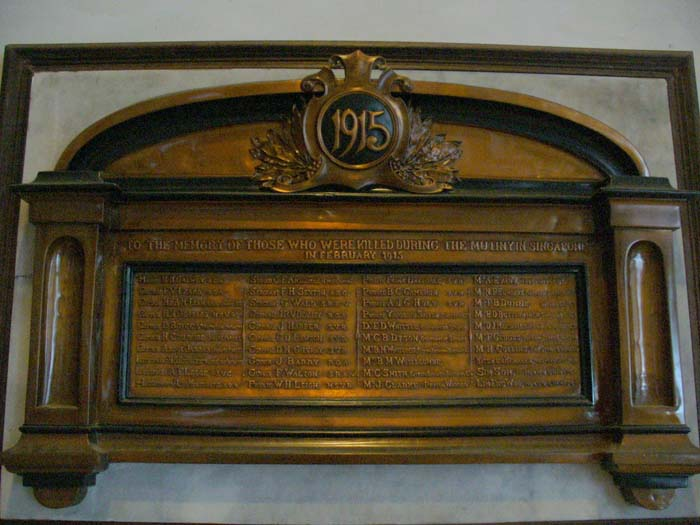
The 1915 Singapore Mutiny memorial tablet at the entrance of the Victoria Memorial Hall, Singapore

The Ghadar Memorial Hall in San Francisco honours members of the party who were hanged following the Lahore conspiracy trial, and the Ghadar Party Memorial Hall in Jalandhar, Punjab commemorates the Ghadarites who were involved in the conspiracy. Several of those executed during the conspiracy are today honoured in India. Kartar Singh is honoured with a memorial at his birthplace of the Village of Sarabha. The Ayurvedic Medicine College in Ludhiana is also named in his honour. The Indian government has produced stamps honouring several of those involved in the conspiracy, including Har Dayal, Bhai Paramanand, and Rash Behari Bose. Several other revolutionaries are also honoured through India and the Indian American population. A memorial plaque commemorating the Komagata Maru was unveiled by Jawaharlal Nehru at Budge Budge in Calcutta in 1954, while a second plaque was unveiled in 1984 at Gateway Pacific, Vancouver by the Canadian government. A heritage foundation to commemorate the passengers from the Komagata Maru excluded from Canada was established in 2005. In Singapore, two memorial tablets at the entrance of the Victoria Memorial Hall and four plaques in St Andrew's Cathedral commemorate the British soldiers and civilians killed during the Singapore Mutiny. In Ireland, a memorial at the Glasnevin Cemetery in Dublin commemorates the dead from the Jalandhar mutiny of the Connaught Rangers. The Southern Asian Institute of Columbia University today runs the Taraknath Das foundation to support work relating to India. Famous awardees include R. K. Narayan, Robert Goheen, Philip Talbot, Anita Desai and SAKHI and Joseph Elder.

== Nomenclature ==
The conspiracy is known under several different names, including the 'Hindu Conspiracy', the 'Indo-German Conspiracy', the 'Ghadar conspiracy' (or 'Ghadr conspiracy'), or the 'German plot'. The term Hindu–German Conspiracy is closely associated with the uncovering of the Annie Larsen plot in the United States, and the ensuing trial of Indian nationalists and the staff of the German Consulate of San Francisco for violating American neutrality. The trial itself was called the Hindu–German Conspiracy Trial, and the conspiracy was reported in the media (and later studied by several historians) as Hindu–German Conspiracy. However, the conspiracy involved not only Hindus and Germans, but also substantial numbers of Muslims and Punjabi Sikhs, and strong Irish support that pre-dated German and Turkish involvement. The term Hindu (or Hindoo) was used commonly in opprobrium in America to identify Indians regardless of religion. Likewise, conspiracy was also a term with negative connotations. The term Hindu Conspiracy was used by the government to actively discredit the Indian revolutionaries at a time the United States was about to join the war against Germany.

The term 'Ghadar Conspiracy' may refer more specifically to the mutiny planned for February 1915 in India, while the term 'German plot' or 'Christmas Day Plot' may refer more specifically to the plans for shipping arms to Jatin Mukherjee in Autumn 1915. The term Indo-German conspiracy is also commonly used to refer to later plans in Southeast Asia and to the mission to Kabul which remained the remnant of the conspiracy at the end of the war. All of these were parts of the larger conspiracy. Most scholars reviewing the American aspect use the name Hindu–German Conspiracy, the Hindu-Conspiracy or the Ghadar Conspiracy, while most reviewing the conspiracy over its entire span from Southeast Asia through Europe to the United States more often use the term Indo-German conspiracy. In British-India, the Rowlatt committee set up investigate the events referred to them as "The Seditious conspiracy".

== See also ==
- Horst von der Goltz
- Hinduism in Germany

== Notes and references ==
=== References ===
- Andreyev, Alexandre (2003), Soviet Russia and Tibet: The Debacle of Secret Diplomacy, 1918-1930s, BRILL, ISBN 90-04-12952-9
- Khizar Humayun Ansari (1986), "Pan-Islam and the Making of the Early Indian Muslim Socialist.", Modern Asian Studies, 20 (3), Cambridge University Press: 509–537, doi:10.1017/s0026749x00007848, S2CID 145177112.
- Barooah, N. K. (2004), Chatto: The Life and Times of an Anti-Imperialist in Europe, Oxford University Press, USA, ISBN 0-19-566547-3
- Bhatt, Chetan (2001), Hindu Nationalism: Origins, Ideologies and Modern Myths, Berg Publishers, ISBN 1-85973-348-4
- Bose, A. C. (1971), Indian Revolutionaries Abroad, 1905–1927, Patna: Bharati Bhawan, ISBN 81-7211-123-1
- Bose, Purnima; Lyons, Laura (1999), "Dyer Consequences: The Trope of Amritsar, Ireland, and the Lessons of the "Minimum" Force Debate.boundary 2, Vol. 26, No. 2. (Summer, 1999), pp. 199–229", Boundary 2, Duke University Press, ISSN 0190-3659.
- Bose, Sugata; Jalal, Ayesha (1998), Modern South Asia: History, Culture, Political Economy, Routledge, ISBN 0-415-16952-6.
- Brown, Emily (May 1973), "(in Book Reviews; South Asia)", The Journal of Asian Studies, 32 (3), University of British Columbia: 522–523, doi:10.2307/2052702, JSTOR 2052702, S2CID 153543772.
- Brown, Emily (1986), "(in Book Reviews; South Asia)", The Journal of Asian Studies, 45 (2), University of British Columbia.: 421–422, doi:10.2307/2055882, JSTOR 2055882.
- Brown, Giles (August 1948), "The Hindu Conspiracy, 1914–1917.", The Pacific Historical Review, 17 (3), University of California Press: 299–310, doi:10.2307/3634258, ISSN 0030-8684, JSTOR 3634258.
- Carr, Cecil T.; et al. (1938), ""British Isles" in Review of Legislation, 1936; British Empire.", Journal of Comparative Legislation and International Law, 3rd, 20 (2), Oxford University Press on behalf of the British Institute of International and Comparative Law: 1–25, ISSN 1479-5949.
- Cell, John W. (2002), Hailey: A Study in British Imperialism, 1872–1969, Cambridge University Press, ISBN 0-521-52117-3.
- Chhabra, G. S. (2005), Advance Study in the History of Modern India, vol. 2: 1803–1920, Lotus Press, ISBN 81-89093-07-X, archived from the original on 17 July 2011.
- Chirol, Valentine (2006), Indian Unrest, Adamant Media Corporation, ISBN 0-543-94122-1.
- Cole, Howard; et al. (2001), Labour and Radical Politics 1762–1937, Routledge, ISBN 0-415-26576-2.
- Collett, Nigel (2006), The Butcher of Amritsar: General Reginald Dyer, Continuum International Publishing Group, ISBN 1-85285-575-4.
- Corr, Gerald H. (1975), The War of the Springing Tigers, Osprey, ISBN 0-85045-069-1.
- Deepak, B. R. (1999), "Revolutionary Activities of the Ghadar Party in China.", China Report, 35, 439, Sage Publications, ISSN 0009-4455.
- Desai, A. R. (2005), Social Background of Indian Nationalism, Popular Prakashan, ISBN 81-7154-667-6.
- Dignan, Don (February 1971), "The Hindu Conspiracy in Anglo-American Relations during World War I", The Pacific Historical Review, 40 (1), University of California Press: 57–76, doi:10.2307/3637829, ISSN 0030-8684, JSTOR 3637829.
- Dignan, Don (1983), The Indian revolutionary problem in British Diplomacy, 1914–1919, New Delhi: Allied Publishers.
- Dutta, Krishna; Desai, Anita (2003), Calcutta: A Cultural and Literary History, Signal Books, ISBN 1-902669-59-2
- Fay, Peter W. (1993), The Forgotten Army: India's Armed Struggle for Independence, 1942–1945, Ann Arbor: University of Michigan Press, ISBN 0-472-08342-2
- Farwell, Bryon (1992), Armies of the Raj: From the Great Indian Mutiny to Independence, 1858–1947, W. W. Norton & Company, ISBN 0-393-30802-2
- Fischer-Tinē, Harald (November 2007), "Indian Nationalism and the 'world forces': Transnational and diasporic dimensions of the Indian freedom movement on the eve of the First World War", Journal of Global History, 2 (3), Cambridge University Press: 325–344, doi:10.1017/S1740022807002318, ISSN 1740-0228, S2CID 145323846
- Fisher, Margaret W. (Spring 1972), "Essays on Gandhian Politics. the Rowlatt Satyagraha of 1919 (in Book Reviews).", Pacific Affairs, 45 (1), University of British Columbia: 128–129, doi:10.2307/2755297, ISSN 0030-851X, JSTOR 2755297
- Fraser, Thomas G. (April 1977), "Germany and Indian Revolution, 1914–18", Journal of Contemporary History, 12 (2), Sage Publications: 255–272, doi:10.1177/002200947701200203, ISSN 0022-0094, S2CID 161813088
- Gupta, Amit K. (September–October 1997), "Defying Death: Nationalist Revolutionism in India, 1897–1938.", Social Scientist, 25 (9/10): 3–27, doi:10.2307/3517678, ISSN 0970-0293, JSTOR 3517678
- Herbert, Edwin (2003), Small Wars and Skirmishes 1902–1918: Early Twentieth-century Colonial Campaigns in Africa, Asia and the Americas, Nottingham: Foundry Books Publications, ISBN 1-901543-05-6
- Hoover, Karl (May 1985), "The Hindu Conspiracy in California, 1913–1918.", German Studies Review, 8 (2), German Studies Association: 245–261, doi:10.2307/1428642, JSTOR 1428642
- Hopkirk, Peter (1997), Like Hidden Fire: The Plot to Bring Down the British Empire, Kodansha Globe, ISBN 1-56836-127-0
- Hopkirk, Peter (2001), On Secret Service East of Constantinople, Oxford Paperbacks, ISBN 0-19-280230-5
- Hughes, Thomas L. (October 2002), "The German Mission to Afghanistan, 1915–1916", German Studies Review, 25 (3), German Studies Association: 447–476, doi:10.2307/1432596, ISSN 0149-7952, JSTOR 1432596
- Isemonger, F. C.; Slattery, J (1919), An Account of the Ghadr Conspiracy, 1913–1915, Lahore: India Government Printing Office-Punjab
- Jalal, Ayesha (2007), "Striking a just balance: Maulana Azad as a theorist of trans-national jihad", Modern Intellectual History, 4 (1), Cambridge University Press: 95–107, doi:10.1017/S1479244306001065, ISSN 1479-2443, S2CID 146697647
- Jensen, Joan M. (February 1979), "The "Hindu Conspiracy": A Reassessment", The Pacific Historical Review, 48 (1), University of California Press: 65–83, doi:10.2307/3638938, JSTOR 3638938
- Kenny, Kevin (2006), Ireland and the British Empire, Oxford University Press, ISBN 0-19-925184-3
- Ker, J. C. (1917), Political Trouble in India 1907–1917, Calcutta.: Superintendent Government Printing, India, 1917. Republished 1973 by Delhi, Oriental Publishers, OCLC 1208166
- Kuwajima, Sho (1988), "First World War and Asia — Indian Mutiny in Singapore (1915)", Journal of Osaka University of Foreign Studies, vol. 69, Osaka University of Foreign Studies, pp. 23–48, ISSN 0472-1411
- Lebra, Joyce C. (1977), Japanese trained armies in South-East Asia, New York: Columbia University Press, ISBN 0-231-03995-6
- Lovett, Sir Verney (1920), A History of the Indian Nationalist Movement, New York: Frederick A. Stokes Company, ISBN 81-7536-249-9
- Majumdar, Ramesh C. (1971), History of the Freedom Movement in India, vol. II, Firma K. L. Mukhopadhyay, ISBN 81-7102-099-2
- Masaryk, T. (1970), Making of a State, Howard Fertig, ISBN 0-685-09575-4
- McKale, Donald M (1998), War by Revolution: Germany and Great Britain in the Middle East in the Era of World War I, Kent State University Press, ISBN 0-87338-602-7
- Owen, N. (2007), The British Left and India, Oxford University Press, ISBN 978-0-19-923301-4
- Plowman, Matthew (2003), "Irish Republicans and the Indo-German Conspiracy of World War I", New Hibernia Review, Center for Irish Studies at the University of St. Thomas: 81–105, ISSN 1092-3977
- Popplewell, Richard J. (1995), Intelligence and Imperial Defence: British Intelligence and the Defence of the Indian Empire 1904–1924, Routledge, ISBN 0-7146-4580-X, archived from the original on 26 March 2009
- Puri, Harish K. (September–October 1980), "Revolutionary Organization: A Study of the Ghadar Movement", Social Scientist, 9 (2/3): 53–66, doi:10.2307/3516925, ISSN 0970-0293, JSTOR 3516925
- Qureshi, M. Naeem (1999), Pan-Islam in British Indian Politics: A Study of the Khilafat Movement, 1918–1924, Brill Academic publishers, ISBN 90-04-11371-1.
- Radhan, O. P. (2002), Encyclopaedia of Political Parties, Anmol Publications Pvt ltd, ISBN 81-7488-865-9.
- Reetz, Dietrich (2007), "The Deoband Universe: What Makes a Transcultural and Transnational Educational Movement of Islam?.", Comparative Studies of South Asia, Africa and the Middle East, 27 (1), Duke University Press: 139–159, doi:10.1215/1089201x-2006-049, S2CID 143345615
- Sareen, Tilak R. (1995), Secret Documents On Singapore Mutiny 1915, New Delhi: Mounto Publishing House, ISBN 81-7451-009-5
- Sarkar, B. K. (March 1921), "Reviewed work: A History of the Indian Nationalist Movement., Verney Lovett", Political Science Quarterly, 36 (1), The Academy of Political Science: 136–138, doi:10.2307/2142669, hdl:2027/coo1.ark:/13960/t3nw01g05, ISSN 0032-3195, JSTOR 2142669
- Sarkar, Sumit (1983), Modern India, 1885–1947, Delhi: Macmillan, ISBN 978-0-333-90425-1
- Seidt, Hans-Ulrich (February 2001), "From Palestine to the Caucasus-Oskar Niedermayer and Germany's Middle Eastern Strategy in 1918.German Studies Review", German Studies Review, 24 (1), German Studies Association: 1–18, doi:10.2307/1433153, ISSN 0149-7952, JSTOR 1433153
- Sims-Williams, Ursula (1980), "The Afghan Newspaper Siraj al-Akhbar.", Bulletin (British Society for Middle Eastern Studies), vol. 7, no. 2, London: Taylor & Francis, pp. 118–122, doi:10.1080/13530198008705294, ISSN 0305-6139
- Sinha, P. B. (November 1971), "A New Source for the History of the Revolutionary Movement in India, 1907– 1917.", The Journal of Asian Studies, 31 (1), Association for Asian Studies: 151–156, doi:10.2307/2053060, ISSN 0021-9118, JSTOR 2053060, S2CID 156523255
- Strachan, Hew (2001), The First World War, vol. I: To Arms, Oxford University Press USA, ISBN 0-19-926191-1
- Strother, French (2004), Fighting Germany's spies, Kessinger Publishing, ISBN 1-4179-3169-8
- Sykes, Peter (August 1921), "South Persia and the Great War", The Geographical Journal, 58 (2), Blackwell publishing on behalf of The Royal Geographical Society: 101–116, Bibcode:1921GeogJ..58..101S, doi:10.2307/1781457, ISSN 0016-7398, JSTOR 1781457
- Tagore, Rabindranath (1997), Selected Letters of Rabindranath Tagore, University of Cambridge Oriental Publications, ISBN 0-521-59018-3
- Tai-Yong, Tan (April 2000), "An Imperial Home-Front: Punjab and the First World War", The Journal of Military History, 64 (2), Society for Military History: 371–410, doi:10.2307/120244, ISSN 0899-3718, JSTOR 120244
- Talbot, Ian (2000), India and Pakistan, Oxford University Press USA., ISBN 0-340-70632-5
- Tinker, Hugh (October 1968), "India in the First World War and after. Journal of Contemporary History, 1918–19: From War to Peace", Journal of Contemporary History, 3 (4), Sage Publications: 89–107, doi:10.1177/002200946800300407, ISSN 0022-0094, S2CID 150456443
- von Pochhammer, Wilhelm (2005), India's Road to Nationhood (2nd ed.), Allied Publishers., ISBN 81-7764-715-6
- Voska, E. V.; Irwin, W. (1940), Spy and Counterspy, New York: Doubleday, Doran & Co
- Ward, W. P. (2002), White Canada Forever: Popular Attitudes and Public Policy Toward Orientals in British Columbia (McGill-Queen's Studies in Ethnic History) (3rd ed.), McGill-Queen's University Press, ISBN 0-7735-2322-7
- Wilkinson, P.; Ashley, J. B. (1993), Gubbins and SOE, Leo Cooper, ISBN 0-85052-556-X
- Woods, B. F. (2007), Neutral Ground: A Political History of Espionage Fiction, Algora Publishing, ISBN 978-0-87586-535-5
- Acharya, M. P. Tirumala (1992), Yadav, B. D. (ed.), M. P. T. Acharya, Reminiscences of an Indian Revolutionary, Anmol Publications Pvt ltd, ISBN 81-7041-470-9

Preceded by India House, Anushilan samiti, Jugantar	Revolutionary movement for Indian independence	Succeeded by Gandhian movement, Hindustan Socialist Republican Army, Jugantar, Indian National Army
