= Vincent Kraft =

German spy

Vincent Kraft (born 1888) was a German double agent in South-East Asia during World War I who was extensively involved in British counter-intelligence in the Hindu–German Conspiracy.

== Biography ==
Kraft was sent to South-East Asia during the war by the German high command as a part of the larger Indo-German Conspiracy and turned a British double-agent at Singapore in 1915. A German planter from Batavia, Kraft enlisted in the Imperial German Army at the beginning of World War I and served in France. Various accounts indicate he was either wounded in battle or faced courtsmartial due to his activities in France for which he faced a possible death penalty, against which he was given the option of returning to Batavia and help organise for the secret shipments or arms to be transferred to the Indian revolutionary underground agreed between the Ghadar Party, the Berlin Committee, and the German Foreign Office. Kraft returned to Batavia to coordinate with Knipping, the German Consul to Peking, but at the same time established contact with the British mission. The intelligence passed on by Kraft, along with that of another agent named Oren were instrumental in uncovering parts of the Hindu–German Conspiracy, especially the plans to ship arms to India on board the SS Maverick and the Henry S in June 1915. Kraft's information was also key in uncovering the proposed sites on the coast of Bay of Bengal where the arms were to be shipped, the operations of Jatindranath Mukherjee's agent Narendranath Bhattacharya with German ministers in South-East Asia, as well as details of Jatin Mukherjee's plans for insurrection in Bengal in August in August 1915.

Kraft leaked details of the plans by German consul at Shanghai, Knipping, to raid the penal colony of Andaman Islands on Christmas Day 1915 and raise an expeditionary force to raide towns on the Indian coast including Madras and Calcutta. His own bogus plans for the raid were in the meantime revealed to Beckett by "Oren", but given the successive failures of the Indo-German plans, the plans for the operations were abandoned on the recommendations of both the Berlin Committee and Knipping. Vincent Kraft was also responsible for passing on to British intelligence detailed information of the Berlin Committee and details of its activities in Washington D.C, in Siam, Dutch East Indies, and in Persia. Kraft later fled through Mexico to Japan where he was last known to be at the end of the war. Kraft, like Oren was not identified in intelligence reports and was only known by the codename "Agent X". His true identity was only uncovered in 1950s when secret India government archives were declassified.
