= Annie Larsen =

American WWI-era three-masted schooner

History

United States
- Name: Annie Larsen
- Owner: James Tuft, San Francisco; sold to a San Diego shipbroker
- Builder: Hall Brothers, Port Blakely, Bainbridge Island, Washington
- Launched: 1881

General characteristics
- Class & type: Schooner
- Tons burthen: 326 tons

Annie Larsen was a three-masted schooner that was involved in arms shipment in the so-called "Hindu German Conspiracy" during World War I.

Annie Larsen was built by the Hall Brothers in 1881. She was owned by James Tufts, of San Francisco, and later by Olson & Mahony and sailed in the coastwise lumber trade. In 1915, she was chartered to a shipbroker.

The ship came into the spotlight when it was seized on 25 June 1915 by US customs officials at Grays Harbor and found to be carrying large quantities of small arms and ammunition in violation of the Neutrality Acts. The arms were meant to be transferred to SS Maverick at a rendezvous off the coast of Mexico. The Annie Larsen affair was one of the major setbacks to the pro-Indian independence Ghadar Party, and was one of the major charges in the trial, one of the largest and most expensive in American legal history.

In 1918, Annie Larsen stranded on Malden Island.

== See also ==
- Boka Star
- Chong Chon Gang
- MV Francop
- Victoria Affair
