= Herambalal Gupta =

Heramba Lal Gupta( C.1884-1950) was an Indian nationalist linked to the Berlin Committee and the Ghadar Party extensively involved in the Hindu–German Conspiracy, who later became a British Intelligence mole inside Mahendra Pratap's Provisional Government of India. He was the son of Umesh Chandradasgupta of Kolkata. He left in 1911 to London for studies, and became involved in revolutionary activities. Janice Mc Kinnon and Stephen Mc Kinnon in their book, Agnes Smedley:The Life and Times of An American Radical, accused Gupta of raping the American journalist and revolutionary, Agnes Smedley. The rape is described in her autobiographical novel, Daughter of Earth.

At the outbreak of World War I, Gupta was in Germany as member of the Berlin Committee, which within a short time established contacts with the Ghadar Party in the United States in what came to be called the Hindu–German Conspiracy. Efforts had begun as early as 1911 to procure arms and smuggle them into India. When a clear idea of the conspiracy emerged, more earnest and elaborate plans were made to obtain arms and to enlist international support. After the failure of the SS Korea mission, Herambalal Gupta took over the leadership of American wing of the Ghadar Party and began efforts to obtain both men and arms. While the former resource was in plentiful supply with more and more Indians coming forward to join the Ghadarite cause, obtaining arms for the uprising proved to be more difficult.

The revolutionaries started negotiations with the Chinese government through James Dietrich, who held Sun Yat-sen's power of attorney, to buy a million rifles. However, the deal fell through when it was realised that the weapons offered were obsolete flintlocks and muzzle loaders. From China, Gupta went to Japan to try to procure arms and to enlist Japanese support for the Indian independence movement. However, he was forced into hiding within 48 hours when he discovered that the Japanese had planned to hand him over to the British. Later reports indicated he was protected at this time by Tōyama Mitsuru.

The ascent of Li Yuanhong to the Chinese Presidency in 1916 led to the negotiations reopening through his former private secretary who resided in the United States at the time. In exchange for allowing arms shipments to India via China's borders, China was offered German military assistance and the rights to 10% of any material shipped to India via China. The negotiations were ultimately unsuccessful due to Sun Yat Sen's opposition to an alliance with Germany.

Gupta is believed to have later met with Mahendra Pratap's Provisional Government of India in Kabul, but he defected in 1918 and turned over his intelligence to British Indian police. He was arrested in the US and imprisoned for 18 months. He jumped bail and escaped to Mexico, where he became a teacher at Universidad Autonoma. He translated Tagore's Chitra into Spanish in 1919. He died on 28 April 1950, in Mexico.
