= SS Maverick =

Oil tanker built in 1890

History
- Name: SS Maverick
- Owner: Standard Oil of New York, from 1890 to after 1910; Maverick Steamship Company, from before 1915
- Builder: Columbian Iron Works
- Yard number: 74
- Completed: May 1890
- Fate: Sank in 1917

General characteristics
- Tonnage: 1,721 long tons (1,749 t)
- Length: 239 ft (73 m)
- Beam: 36 ft (11 m)
- Depth: 27.8 ft (8.5 m)
- Propulsion: 3-cylinder compound engines
- Capacity: 15,000 barrels (~2,000 t) of oil

SS Maverick was an oil tanker built in 1890 for the Standard Oil of New York, later Mobil Oil. After the ship had changed hands sometime between 1910 and 1915, it was used during World War I as part of the Hindu–German Conspiracy to foment rebellion in India and overthrow the British Raj. According to one source, the ship sank in 1917.

== History ==
SS Maverick was laid down at the Columbian Iron Works in Baltimore, Maryland as a 1,721-long-ton (1,749 t) tanker for Standard Oil of New York, and delivered in May 1890. On 17 July 1899, Maverick caught fire while unloading a cargo of oil at Halifax. A subsequent explosion ripped a hole in the side of the steam tanker, which sank at its pier. By 1907 the ship had been repaired and was back in service, and by 1910 had been equipped with a 2½ kW radio with a range of 200 miles (320 km).

At some point between 1910 and 1915, the ship was sold to the Maverick Steamship Company. According to one period source, in April 1915 the ship had been chartered to one F. Jebsen, who was an officer in the Kaiserliche Marine. Jebsen was also the master of SS Mazatlan, a ship that had been suspected of secretly resupplying the German light cruiser SMS Leipzig in August 1914.

On 20 April 1915 rumors that Maverick was loading ammunition at Los Angeles reached a United States Customs Service agent, who ordered an inspection. By the time the order was issued, however, Maverick had weighed anchor and sailed to Long Beach and entered a drydock there. On 22 April 1915, she sailed under a Captain Starr-Hunt from San Pedro, California with a crew of 25 plus five so-called "Persians". However these were in fact Indians and included Hari Singh who carried with him quantities of Ghadar Party literature. The ship was to rendezvous with the schooner Annie Larsen at the island of Socorro, with the intention of transferring a quantity of arms to the Maverick. However, when the Annie Larsen failed to appear, the Maverick continued to Java via Honolulu. The Annie Larsen eventually appeared in Hoquiam, Washington, where United States authorities seized its cargo.

The Maverick continued to Jakarta, arriving there towards the end of August. She attracted attention, on account of the five Sikhs she had on board. The Maverick remained in Jakarta until the end of the war.

According to one source, the tanker sank in 1917.
