= List of people from Punjab, India =

This is a list of people from Punjab, India.

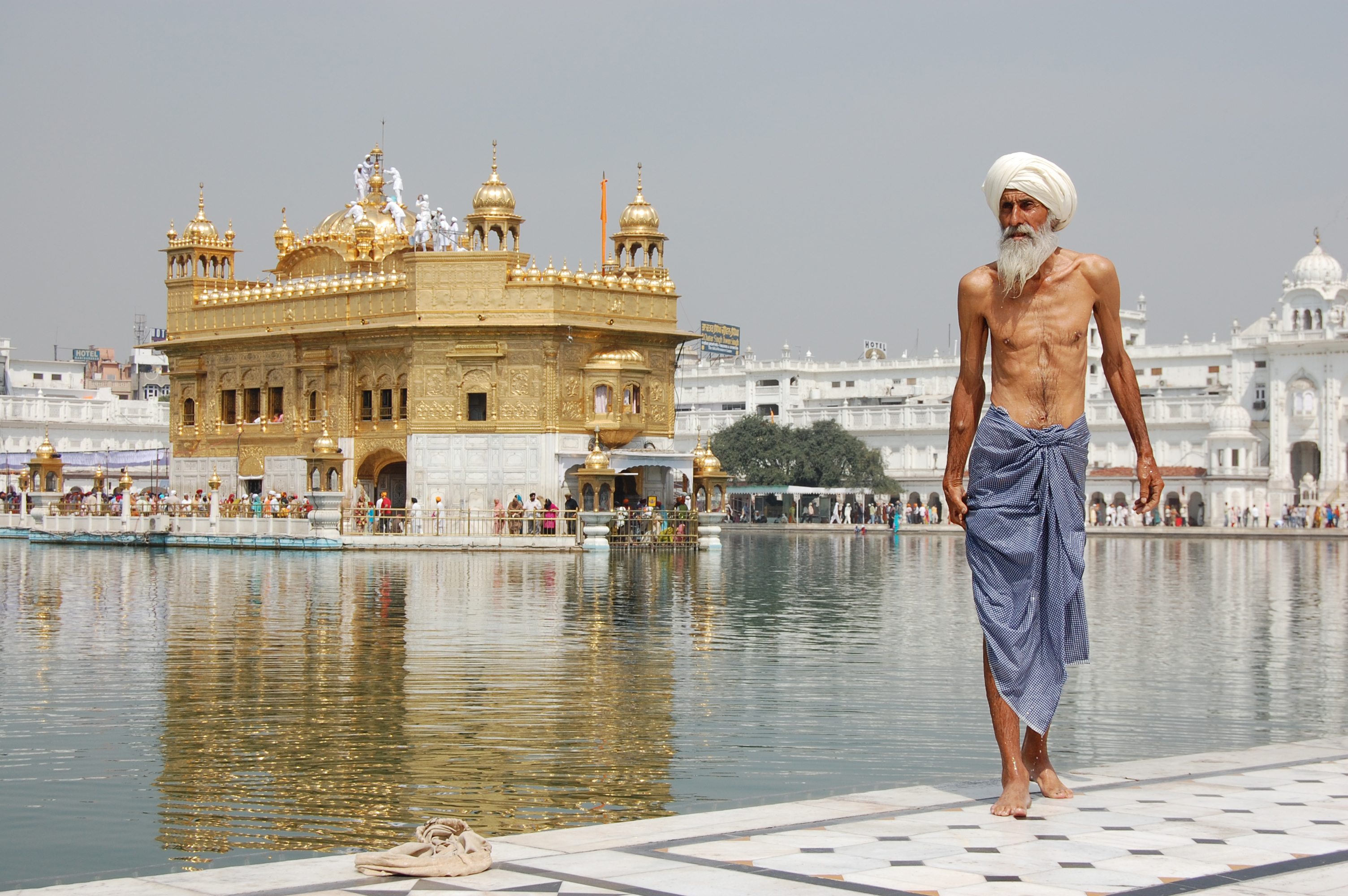
Sikh pilgrim at the Golden Temple, Amritsar India

== Nobel laureates ==
- Har Gobind Khorana

== Rulers ==
- Maharaja Ranjit Singh was a founder of a Sikh Empire
- Porus the Elder was an ancient Indian King
- Banda Singh Bahadur was a commander of Khalsa army
- Nawab Kapur Singh was the organizer of the Sikh Confederacy and the Dal Khalsa.
- Jassa Singh Ahluwalia, Sikh leader during the Sikh Confederacy, being the Supreme Leader of the Dal Khalsa. He was also Misldar of the Ahluwalia Misl from approximately 1716 to 1801. He founded the Kapurthala State in 1772
- Charat Singh, the father of Mahan Singh, and grandfather of Ranjit Singh. He distinguished himself in campaigns against Ahmad Shah Abdali and split from the Singhpuria Misl to establish the Sukerchakia Misl.
- Maha Singh, the eldest son of Charat Singh and Desan Kaur, who became the second chief of the Sukerchakia Misl on the death of his father. His son Ranjit Singh succeeded him and established the Sikh Empire. He is known for his alliance with Jassa Singh Ramgarhia and for reducing the power of the Kanhaiya Misl
- Jassa Singh Ramgarhia was a prominent Sikh leader during the period of the Sikh Confederacy. He was the Commander of the Ramgarhia Misl

=== Other Notable Misl Rulers ===
- Jai Singh Kanhaiya was the founder of Kanhaiya Misl, he was one of the most powerful sikh rulers during Sikh Confederacies period
- Sada Kaur Mother-in-law of Ranjit Singh. She served as a chief of the Kanhaiya Misl from 1789 to 1821
- Hari Singh Dhillon one of the most powerful, admired in all the sikhs in 18th century. He was the Maharaja of Amritsar and Lahore and large area of central and western part of Punjab
- Baghel Singh was the chief of Singh Krora Misl

=== Mughal Governors ===
- Abd al-Samad Khan
- Zakariya Khan Bahadur
- Adina Beg
- Wazir Khan (Sirhind)
- Moin-ul-Mulk

== Military leaders ==
=== Indian Armed Forces ===
==== Air Force ====
- Marshal of the Indian Air Force Arjan Singh, former Chief of Indian Air Force, the only living Indian military officer with a five-star rank.
- Air Chief Marshal Om Prakash Mehra, former Chief of Indian Air Force
- Air Chief Marshal Dilbagh Singh, former Chief of the Indian Air Force

==== Army ====
- General Bikram Singh, former Indian Army chief
- General J. J. Singh, former Indian Army Chief
- General Pran Nath Thapar, former Indian Army Chief
- Lieutenant General Jagjit Singh Aurora, General Officer Commanding-in-Chief (GOC-in-C) of the Eastern Command of the Indian Army during the Indo-Pakistani War of 1971.
- Lieutenant General Harbaksh Singh, Western Army Commander and War Hero 1965 Indo-Pak War
- Brigadier Kuldip Singh Chandpuri (retired), known for his heroic leadership in the famous Battle of Longewala for which he was awarded Maha Vir Chakra (MVC) by the Indian Army

==== Navy ====
- Admiral Sardarilal Mathradas Nanda
- Admiral Karambir Singh

== Military Gallantry Award winners ==
=== British Indian Army ===
==== Victoria Cross ====
- Karamjeet Singh Judge, 15th Punjab Regiment
- Gian Singh, Sikh Regiment
- Ishar Singh, 28th Punjabis; first Sikh to receive Victoria Cross
- Nand Singh, 1/11th Sikh Regiment
- Parkash Singh, Sikh Regiment
- Sher Shah, 16th Punjab Regiment

=== Indian Armed Forces ===
==== Param Veer Chakra (PVC) ====
- Subedar Joginder Singh Sahnan, Sikh Regiment
- Gurbachan Singh Salaria, 1 Gorkha Rifles
- Nirmal Jit Singh Sekhon, Indian Air Force
- Lance Naik Karam Singh, Sikh Regiment

==== Maha Veer Chakra (MVC) ====
- Brigadier Kuldip Singh Chandpuri, known for his heroic leadership in the famous Battle of Longewala
- Ranjit Singh Dyal, Indian Army general and an administrator
- Wing Commander Jag Mohan Nath, officer in Indian Air Force
- Major General Kulwant Singh Pannu, officer of Indian Army
- Lieutenant Colonel Dewan Ranjit Rai, senior Indian Army officer
- General Tapishwar Narain Raina, former Chief of the Army Staff of Indian Army
- Nand Singh, also an Indian recipient of Victoria Cross
- Sukhjit Singh
- Major General Rajinder Singh Sparrow, Armoured Corps

== Business ==
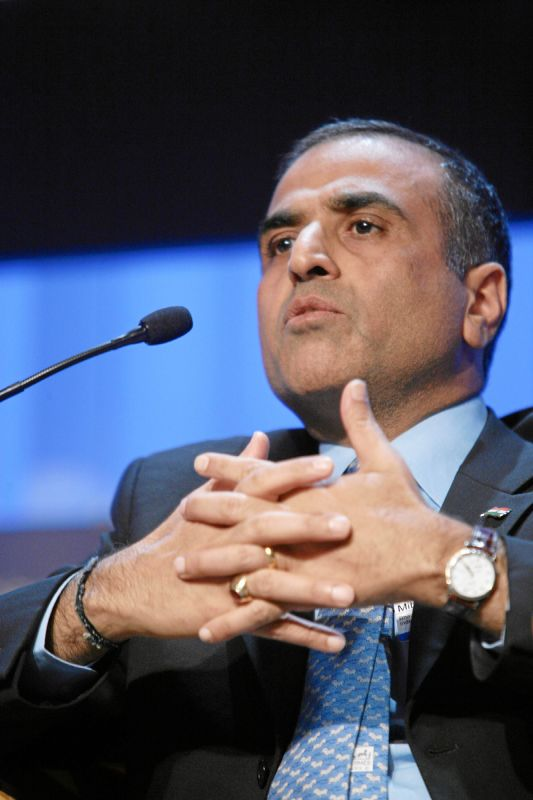
Sunil Bharti Mittal is the chairman and managing director of Bharti Telecom.

- Trishneet Arora
- Sabeer Bhatia, co-founder of Hotmail
- Gurbaksh Chahal
- Naresh Goyal, of Jet Airways
- Sunil Mittal, Chairman and managing director of the Bharti group
- Aroon Purie, India Today group
- Kanwal Rekhi, one of the first Indian entrepreneurs in Silicon Valley

== Artists ==
- Manjit Bawa, modern artists from Punjab, later shifted to Delhi.
- Sohan Qadri, modern artists from Punjab, later shifted to Copenhagen.
- S. G. Thakur Singh, Punjabi artist who painted in oils, pastels and water colour.
- Satish Gujral, world known painter, sculptor and architect.
- Sidharth (artist), contemporary painter.
- Sobha Singh, oil painting master later shifted to Kangra.
- Gurpreet Singh, pro-people painting artist from Bathinda.
- Sarindar Dhaliwal
- Jas Kohli

== Educators and scientists ==
- Megh R. Goyal, father of irrigation engineering in Puerto Rico
- Narinder Singh Kapany

== Historians ==
- Hari Ram Gupta
- Ganda Singh
- Harjinder Singh Dilgeer

== Astronauts ==
- Air Commodore Ravish Malhotra
- Rakesh Sharma, first Indian in space

== Punjabi Cinema ==
=== Punjabi Actors ===
- Diljit Dosanjh
- Gurpreet Ghuggi
- Amrinder Gill
- Gugu Gill
- Gippy Grewal
- Gurdas Maan
- Yograj Singh
- Jimmy Sheirgill
- Ammy Virk
- Sidhu Moose Wala

=== Punjabi Actress ===
- Sargun Mehta
- Mandy Takhar
- Sonam Bajwa
- Neeru Bajwa
- Himanshi Khurana
- Shehnaaz Gill

== Bollywood ==
=== Families ===
The Anands

- Chetan Anand
- Dev Anand
- Vijay Anand
- Shekhar Kapur

The Chopras

- Baldev Raj Chopra
- Yash Chopra
- Ravi Chopra

The Deols

- Dharmendra
- Sunny Deol

The Devgans

- Veeru Devgan
- Anil Devgan

The Dutts

- Sunil Dutt
- Sanjay Dutt

The Oberois

- Suresh Oberoi
- Vivek Oberoi

The Paintals

- Paintal
- Gufi Paintal

The Puris

- Madan Puri
- Amrish Puri

The Sahnis

- Balraj Sahni
- Bhisham Sahni
- Parikshit Sahni

=== Individual artists ===
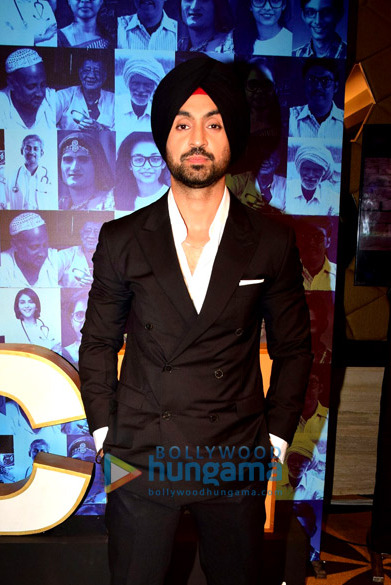
Diljit Dosanjh

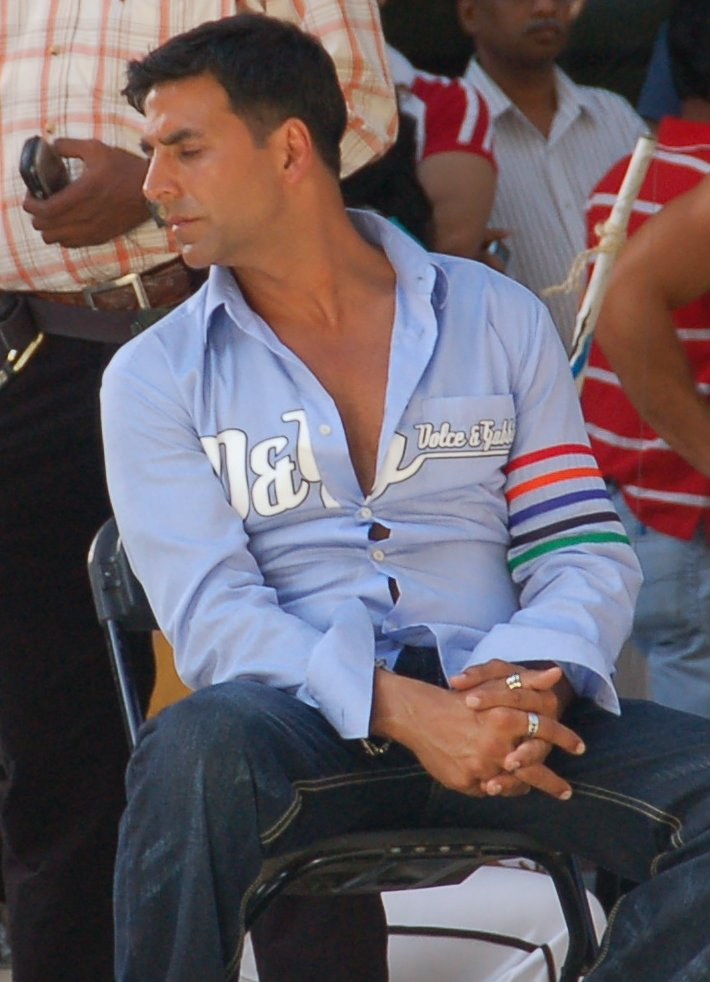
Akshay Kumar

- Amrish Puri
- Anand Bakshi
- Akshay Kumar
- Bina Rai
- Diljit Dosanjh
- David Dhawan
- Deepti Naval
- Dara Singh
- Divya Dutta
- Geeta Bali
- Gul Panag
- Honey Singh
- I. S. Johar
- Jeetendra (Ravi Kapoor)
- Jimmy Shergill
- Kapil Sharma
- Kamini Kaushal
- Kulbhushan Kharbanda
- Kirron Kher
- Mangal Dhillon
- Mukesh Khanna
- Mandira Bedi
- Monica Bedi
- Mohammed Rafi
- Neha Dhupia
- Navin Nischol
- Om Prakash
- Pankaj Kapur
- Poonam Dhillon
- Prem Chopra
- Parmeet Sethi
- Pooja Batra
- Pooja Bedi
- Ruby Bhatia
- Ranjeet
- Raj Babbar
- Rajendra Kumar
- Rati Agnihotri
- Raveena Tandon
- Rajat Kapoor
- Rajesh Khanna
- Ranbir Pushp
- Rahul Roy
- Rajit Kapur
- Roshan
- Rubina Shergill
- Simone Singh
- Sidhu Moosewala
- Simi Garewal
- Saeed Jaffrey
- Vinod Khanna
- Vinod Mehra
- Vicky Kaushal

=== Documentary filmmakers ===
- Jaspal Bhatti

=== Directors ===
- Harry Baweja
- Yash Chopra
- David Dhawan

=== Crossover directors and actors (Hollywood) ===
- Waris Ahluwalia
- Art Malik
- Deepa Mehta

== History ==
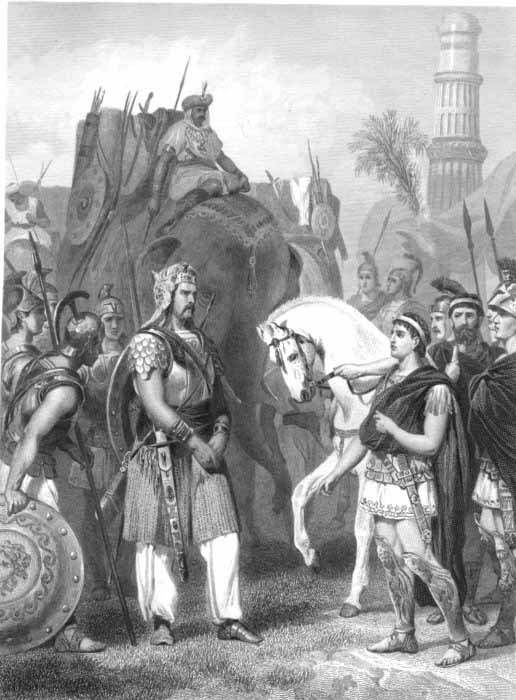
Porus and Alexender

- Charaka

== Folklore ==
- Puran Bhagat

== Religious and spiritual figures ==
=== The Ten Gurus of Sikhism ===
- Guru Nanak
- Guru Angad
- Guru Amar Das
- Guru Ram Das
- Guru Arjan Dev
- Guru Hargobind
- Guru Har Rai
- Guru Har Krishan
- Guru Teg Bahadur
- Guru Gobind Singh
- Guru Granth Sahib

=== Sikh ===
- Harbhajan Singh Yogi
- Giani Sant Singh Maskeen

=== Related to Sikhism ===
- Sri Chand, son of Guru Nanak Dev

=== Radha Soami Satsang Beas ===
- Baba Jaimal Singh
- Baba Sawan Singh
- Sardar Bahadur Maharaj Jagat Singh
- Maharaj Charan Singh
- Baba Gurinder Singh

=== Ahmidiyya Muslim Community ===
- Mirzā Ghulām Ahmad
- Mirza Basheer-ud-Din Mahmood Ahmad
- Mirza Nasir Ahmad
- Mirza Tahir Ahmad

== Writers ==
=== Punjabi, Hindi and Urdu ===
Giani Gurdit Singh

- Ajmer Rode
- Amrita Pritam
- Bhai Gurdas
- Bhai Kahn Singh Nabha
- Bhai Vir Singh
- Damodar Das Arora
- Devendra Satyarthi
- Dhani Ram Chatrik
- Giani Gurdit Singh
- Gulzar (full name Sampooran Singh Gulzar), Oscar winner for movie Slumdog Millionaire
- Gursharan Singh (1929 – 2011), theatre director and playwright
- Hafeez Jullundhri
- Harbhajan Singh
- Jaswant Neki
- Jaswant Singh Kanwal
- Kulwant Singh Virk
- Mehr Lal Soni Zia Fatehabadi
- Munir Niazi
- Nanak Singh
- Navtej Bharati
- Pandit Lekh Ram
- Pash
- Rajinder Singh Bedi
- Ram Sarup Ankhi
- Rupinderpal Singh Dhillon
- Saadat Hasan Manto
- Sahir Ludhianvi
- Shardha Ram Phillauri
- Shiv Kumar Batalvi

=== English ===
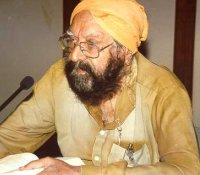
Khushwant Singh is a prominent Indian novelist and journalist.

- Khushwant Singh
- Vikram Chandra
- Kartar Singh Duggal
- Amrita Pritam
- Partap Sharma
- Susham Bedi
- Ahmed Rashid
- Vidya Dhar Mahajan

== Journalists ==
=== Print ===
==== India ====
- Kuldip Nayar
- Arun Shourie
- Aroon Purie
- Tarun Tejpal
- Prabhu Chawla
- Tavleen Singh

== Tamil cinema ==
- Sonia Agarwal, Punjabi Hindu

== Models ==
- Waris Ahluwalia, American model, endorses the clothing brand GAP

== Musicians ==
=== Punjabi Folk and Classical Music ===
- Sardool Sikander
- Kamal Heer
- Gurdas Maan
- Kuldeep Manak
- Yamla Jatt
- Amar Singh Chamkila

=== Punjabi Pop and Hip Hop ===
- Sidhu Moose Wala
- Diljit Dosanjh
- Karan Aujla
- Amrinder Gill
- Guru Randhawa
- Yo Yo Honey Singh
- Jassi Gill

=== Bollywood ===
- Sardool Sikander
- Suraiya
- Shamshad Begum
- Mohammed Rafi
- OP Nayyar
- Mahendra Kapoor
- Madan Mohan
- Sukhwinder Singh
- Diljit Dosanjh
- Kamal Khan, Bollywood playback singer
- Jaspinder Narula
- Jyotica Tangri
- Yo Yo Honey Singh
- Guru Randhawa
- Khushboo Grewal

=== Bhangra and other Punjabi people ===
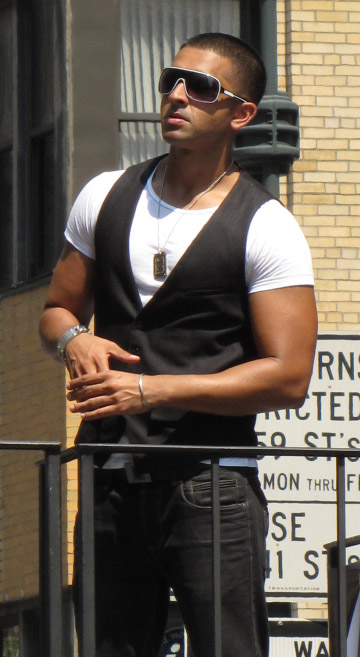
Jay Sean

- Asa Singh Mastana
- Surinder Shinda
- Surinder Kaur
- Malkit Singh
- Manmohan Waris
- Kamal Heer
- Daler Mehndi
- Surjit Bindrakhia
- Babbu Mann
- Balkar Sidhu
- Lehmber Hussainpuri
- Hans Raj Hans
- Sukhwinder Singh
- Jaspinder Narula
- Kulwinder Dhillon
- Bombay Rockers
- Harshdeep Kaur
- Sukhbir
- Labh Janjua
- Sukhshinder Shinda
- Bally Sagoo
- Apache Indian
- Channi Singh
- Panjabi MC
- Jay Sean
- Hard Kaur
- Rishi Rich
- Juggy D
- Taz
- Harbhajan Mann
- Jazzy B
- Miss Pooja

== Revolutionaries and Freedom Fighters ==
- Prithvi Singh Azad, Indian independence activist, revolutionary and one of the founder members of Ghadar Party
- Bhai Balmukund was an Indian revolutionary freedom fighter
- Sohan Singh Bhakna, was an Indian revolutionary, the founding president of the Ghadar Party
- Amir Chand Bombwal
- Diwan Mulraj Chopra
- Satyapal Dang
- Jathedar Bhai Tehal Singh Dhanju, Indian Freedom Fighter, Sikh leader and activist; planned The Lahore Conspiracies
- Madan Lal Dhingra, was an Indian revolutionary independence activist
- Kishan Singh Gargaj, Indian Freedom Fighter and Founder of militant Babbar Akali Movement against British rule
- Sadhu Singh Hamdard, well-known freedom fighter and the journalist of Punjab
- Dharam Singh Hayatpur, was an Indian revolutionary, he was a prominent member of the Sikh political and religious group the Babbar Akali Movement in India
- Kartar Singh Jhabbar, was an Indian revolutionary, he was a Sikh leader known for his role in the Gurdwara Reform Movement of the 1920s
- Sohan Singh Josh, was an Indian communist activist and freedom fighter
- Gulab Kaur
- Sardul Singh Kavishar
- Saifuddin Kitchlew
- Sunder Singh Lyallpuri, was a General of Akali Movement
- Mangu Ram Mugowalia, Indian freedom fighter, politician from Punjab and one of the founder members of the Ghadar Party
- Bhai Parmanand
- Darshan Singh Pheruman, Indian freedom fighter, Sikh activist and politician
- Jaswant Singh Rahi
- Lala Lajpat Rai, Indian Freedom Fighter, popularly known as Punjab Kesari
- Ram Rakha
- Lala Achint Ram
- Harnam Singh Saini
- Labh Singh Saini, Akali politician and notable Indian freedom fighter
- Maya Singh Saini, was a soldier in the Sikh Khalsa Army during the Anglo-Sikh Wars and continued fighting British Rule after the Second war
- Teja Singh Samundri
- Kartar Singh Sarabha, Indian Independence activist and a Ghadr revolutionary
- Baba Gurdit Singh
- Baba Gurmukh Singh, Indian Freedom Fighter, a Ghadr revolutionary and a Sikh activist
- Baba Kharak Singh
- Baldev Singh, was an Indian independence movement leader and also the first Defence Minister of India
- Bhagat Singh, Indian Freedom Fighter and most common symbol of India's Freedom Struggle by any means and a Ghadr revolutionary
- Captain Mohan Singh, was an Indian military officer and also an Indian Independence Activist
- Ganda Singh, was a prominent member of the Ghadar Party
- Giani Ditt Singh
- Pandit Kanshi Ram, Was an Indian Revolutionary and Treasurer Of Ghadar Party
- Ram Singh, credited as being the first Indian to use non-cooperation and boycott of British merchandise and services as a political weapon.
- Ripudaman Singh, Indian revolutionary
- Sardar Ajit Singh, was an Indian revolutionary, he was the uncle of sardar Bhagat Singh and an alleged assassin for the Ghadar Party
- Udham Singh, Indian Revolutionary
- Teja Singh Swatantar
- Sukhdev Thapar, was an Indian Revolutionary
- Bhagwati Charan Vohra, was an Indian revolutionary, associated with Hindustan Socialist Republican Association

== Politicians ==
=== India ===
- Amarinder Singh
- Amrinder Singh Raja Warring
- Baldev Singh
- Bhagwant Mann
- Buta Singh
- Charanjit Singh Channi
- Darbara Singh
- Fateh Singh
- Gulzarilal Nanda
- Gurcharan Singh Tohra
- Gurdial Singh Dhillon
- Harkishan Singh Surjeet
- Inder Kumar Gujral
- Jagir Kaur
- Krishan Kant
- Laxmi Kanta Chawla
- Madan Lal Khurana
- Malik Umar Hayat Khan
- Manmohan Singh
- Chaudhary Nand Lal
- Parkash Singh Badal
- Partap Singh Kairon
- Partap Singh Bajwa
- Rajinder Kaur Bhattal
- Sardul Singh Kavishar
- Simranjit Singh Mann
- Sukhjinder Singh Randhawa
- Surjit Singh Barnala
- Swaran Singh
- Tara Singh
- Zail Singh

== Sportspersons ==
=== Cricket ===
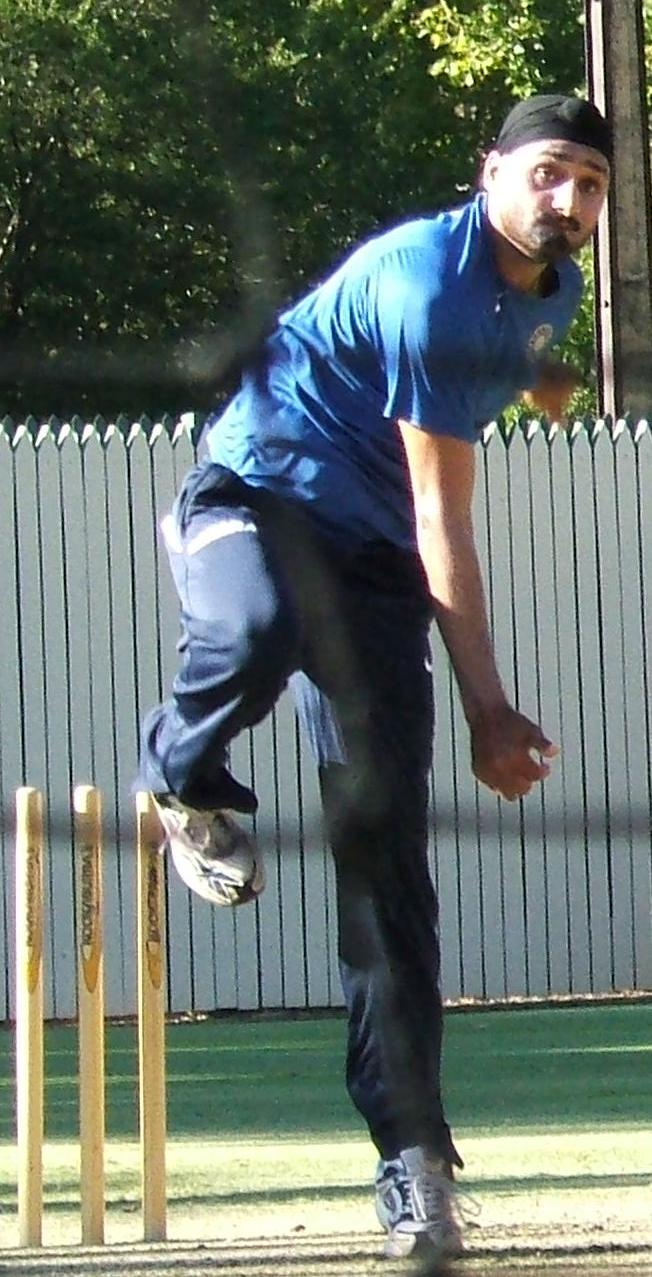
Harbhajan, pictured here bowling in the nets

- Yadavendra Singh
- Lala Amarnath
- Mohinder Amarnath
- Bishan Singh Bedi
- Bhupinder Singh snr
- Gursharan Singh
- Yograj Singh
- Amarjit Kaypee
- Maninder Singh
- Rajinder Ghai
- Navjot Singh Sidhu
- Chetan Sharma
- Madan Lal
- Dinesh Mongia
- Harbhajan Singh
- Yuvraj Singh
- V. R. V. Singh
- Reetinder Sodhi
- Sunny Sohal
- Shubman Gill

=== Hockey ===
==== Field hockey ====
- Ajitpal Singh
- Balbir Singh Sr.
- Prithipal Singh
- Baljeet Singh Saini
- Gagan Ajit Singh
- Prabhjot Singh
- Ramandeep Singh
- Baljit Singh Dhillon
- Deepak Thakur
- Surjit Singh Randhawa

=== Athletics ===
- Milkha Singh
- Ajmer Singh (1940–2010), Olympian and 1966 Jakarta Asian Games gold medallist sprinter
- Kamaljeet Sandhu
- Baljinder Singh (born 1986), race walker
- Inderjeet Singh, shot put athlete

=== Golf ===
- Jeev Milkha Singh
- Gaganjeet Bhullar

=== Wrestling ===
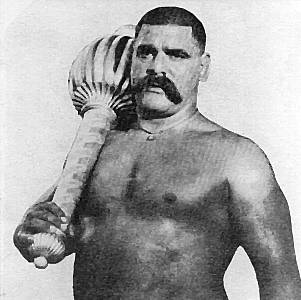
The "Great" Gama

- The Great Gama
- Dara Singh
- Jinder Mahal
- Premchand Degra
- Tiger Jeet Singh
- Gurjit Singh
- Sonjay Dutt (real name Ritesh Bhalla), TNA wrestler

=== Fighters ===
- Akshay Kumar, real name Rajeev Bhatia, black belt in karate; film actor
- Veeru Devgan, father of Ajay Devgan, action and stunt designer

=== Shooting ===
- Avneet Sidhu, Commonwealth Games medalist, Arjun Award recipient
- Harveen Srao, 2011 Summer Universiade medalist in 10m air pistol

=== Basketball ===
- Satnam Singh Bhamara, drafted by the Dallas Mavericks with the 52nd pick in the 2015 NBA draft, making him the first person of Indian descent to be drafted into the NBA

Sports Executives and Administrators

- Shammi Rana

== See also ==
- List of Sikhs
- List of British Sikhs
- List of British Punjabis
