= Vishnu Ganesh Pingle =

Indian revolutionary

- विष्णु गणेश पिंगळे
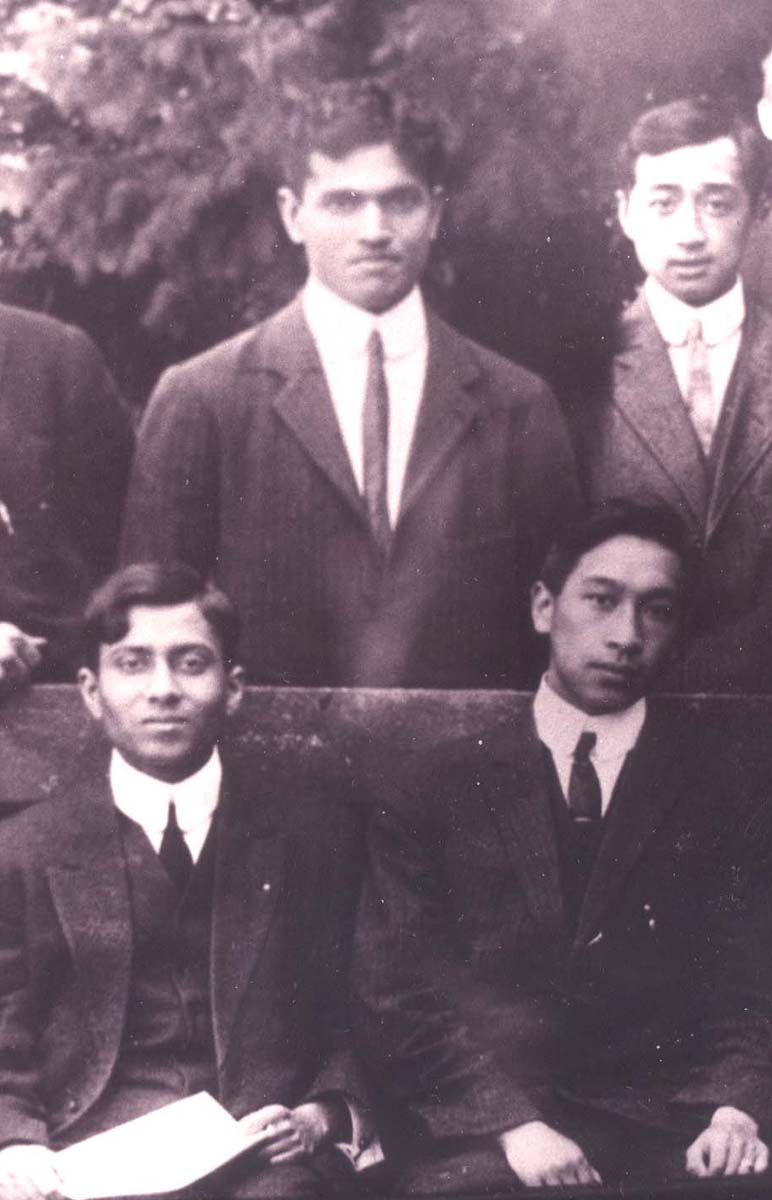
- Vishnu Ganesh Pingle while a student at the University of Washington. Standing in the middle.
- Born: 2 January 1888; Talegaon Dhamdhere, Poona, Bombay Presidency
- Died: 16 November 1915 (aged 27); Lahore, British India
- Cause of death: Execution by hanging
- Other name: Baburde Ganesh Pingle
- Organization: Ghadar Party
- Movement: Swadeshi movement, Indian independence movement, Ghadar Conspiracy

Vishnu Ganesh Pingle (2 January 1888 – 16 November 1915) was an Indian revolutionary and a key member of the Ghadar Party. Born in Pune, Maharashtra, he studied engineering at the University of Washington before returning to India to lead revolutionary efforts. Pingle collaborated with leaders like Rash Behari Bose and Sachin Sanyal in organizing the Ghadr mutiny of 1915, which aimed to trigger a nationwide armed uprising against British rule. Arrested in Meerut with explosives, he was executed at Lahore Central Jail alongside Kartar Singh Sarabha. Despite his sacrifice at a young age, Pingle remains a largely unsung hero.

== Early life ==
Vishnu Ganesh Pingle was born on 2 January 1888 to a Marathi speaking Deshastha Rigvedi Brahmin family Talegaon Dhamdhere, near Poona District, in the Bombay Presidency. The youngest of nine siblings, Pingle grew up in a loving family and at the age of nine was admitted to the primary school in Talegaon Dabhade. In 1905, Pingle enrolled at the Maharashtra Vidyalaya in Poona which at the time was linked to the Bombay University. While at school, Pingle came under the influence of the nationalist movement of the time, and actively participated in the movement under V. D. Savarkar. However, Pingle later transferred to the Samarth Vidyalaya in Talegoan Dabhade in 1908 following the closure of Maharashtra Vidyalay due to shortage of funds. However, his early involvement in the nationalist movement left a lasting imprint.

In 1910, Samartha Vidyalaya was closed by the British Government. Vishnu left for Mumbai and found employment in Govindrao Potdar's Pioneer Alkali works at Mahim. Mr. Potdar was a nationalist and an expert at explosives. He belonged to the Nationalist Group and introduced Vishnu to his associates. One of them was Hari Laxman Patil, a lawyer from Vasai, with whom Vishnu came to form a close friendship. At the height of the Swadeshi movement, inspired by the Japanese handloom industry, Pingle began his own small Swadeshi loom at Ausa, near Latur. However, Pingle's ambition was to be an engineer.

== United States ==
Vishnu was also strongly influenced by the history of the American War of Independence. In 1911, Pingle left Asia for the United States. It is said that he kept the news of his impending departure from his family and only told his elder brother Keshavrao of his plans at the railway station. He reached America via Hong Kong, and enrolled as a student of mechanical engineering at the University of Washington in 1912. While in the United States, Pingle became associated with the Ghadar Party and became an active worker. As World War I opened in Europe, plans began between the Germans, the Berlin Committee in Europe and the Ghadarite movement in America to attempt an insurrection in India.

== Ghadar Conspiracy ==
Pingle had known Satyen Sen (Jatin Mukherjee's emissary) in the company of Gadhar members (such as Kartar Singh Sarabha) at the University of California, Berkeley. Tasked to consolidate contact with the Indian revolutionary movement, as part of the Ghadar Conspiracy, Satyen Sen, Kartar Singh Sarabha, V. G. Pingle and a batch of Sikh revolutionaries sailed from America by the S.S. Salamin in the second half of October 1914. Satyen and Pingle halted in China for a few days to meet the Gadhar leaders (mainly Tahal Singh) for future plans. They met Dr Sun Yat-sen for co-operation. Dr Sun was not prepared to displease the British. After Satyen and party left for India, Tahal sent Atmaram Kapur, Santokh Singh and Shiv Dayal Kapur to Bangkok for necessary arrangements.

In November 1914, Pingle, Kartar Singh Sarabha and Satyen Sen arrived in Calcutta. Satyen introduced Pingle and Kartar Singh Sarabha to Jatin Mukherjee. "Pingle had long talks with Jatin Mukherjee, who sent them to Rash Behari" in Benares with necessary information during the third week of December. Satyen remained in Calcutta at 159 Bow Bazar Street. Charles Tegart, the Calcutta police superintendent, was informed of an attempt to tamper with some Sikh troops at the Dakshineswar gunpowder magazine. "A reference to the Military authorities shows that the troops in question were the 93rd Burmans" sent to Mesopotamia. Jatin Mukherjee and Satyen Sen were seen interviewing these Sikhs.

Since 1900, the Extremist leaders under Lokamanya Tilak's inspiration, turned Benares into a centre for sedition. Sundar Lal (b. 1885, son of Tota Ram, Muzaffarnagar) had given a very objectionable speech in 1907 on Shivaji Festival in Benares. Follower of Tilak, Lala Lajpat Rai and Sri Aurobindo, in 1908 this man had accompanied Lala in his UP lecture tour. His organ, the Swarajya of Allahabad, was warned in April 1908 against sedition. On 22 August 1909, Sundar Lal and Sri Aurobindo delivered "mischievous speeches" in College Square, Calcutta. The Karmayogi in Hindi was issued in Allahabad since September 1909: controlled by Sri Aurobindo, the Calcutta Karmagogin was edited by Amarendra Chatterjee who had introduced Rash Behari to Sundar Lal. In 1915, Pingle will be received in Allahabad by the Swarajya group.

Rash Behari had been in Benares since early 1914. Large number of outrages were committed there between October 1914 and September 1915, 45 of them before February was over. On 18 November 1914, while examining two bomb caps, he and Sachin Sanyal had been injured. They shifted to a house in Bangalitola, where Pingle visited him with a letter from Jatin Mukherjee and reported that some 4,000 Sikhs of the Ghadar had already reached Calcutta. 15,000 more were waiting to come and join the rebellion. Behari sent Pingle and Sachin to Amritsar, to discuss with Mula Singh who had come from Shanghai. Rash Behari's man of confidence, Pingle led a hectic life in UP and Punjab for several weeks.

During the Komagata Maru affray in Budge Budge, near Calcutta, on 29 September 1914, Baba Gurdit Singh had contacted Atulkrishna Ghosh and Satish Chakravarti, two eminent associates of Jatin Mukherjee, who actively assisted them. Since then, angry letters from US-based Indians reached India with hope of a German victory; one of the emigrant leaders warned that his associates were in touch with the Bengal revolutionary party. It was at this juncture, in December 1914, that Pingle arrived in the Punjab, promising Bengali co-operation to the malcontent emigrants. A meeting demanded revolution, plundering of Government treasuries, seduction of Indian troops, collection of arms, preparation of bombs and the commission of dacoities. Rash Behari planned collecting gangs of villagers for the rebellion. Simultaneous outbreaks at Lahore, Ferozepore & Rawalpindi was designed. Rising at Dacca, Benares, Jubbalpur to be extended.

Preparing bombs was a definite part of the Ghadar programme. The Sikh conspirators – knowing very little about it – decided to call in a Bengali expert, as they had known in California Professor Surendra Bose, associate of Tarak Nath Das. Towards the end of December 1914, at a meeting at Kapurthala, Pingle announced that a Bengali babu was ready to co-operate with them. On 3 January 1915, Pingle and Sachindra in Amritsar received Rs 500 from the Ghadar, and returned to Benares.

Pingle returned to Calcutta with Rash Behari's invitation to the Jugantar leaders to meet him at Benares for co-ordinating and finalising their plans. Jatin Mukherjee, Atulkrishna Ghosh, Naren Bhattacharya left for Benares (early January 1915). In a very important meeting, Rash Behari announced the rebellion, proclaiming : "Die for their country." Though through Havildar Mansha Singh, the 16th Rajput Rifles at Fort William was successfully approached, Jatin Mukherjee wanted two months for the army revolt, synchronising with the arrival of the German arms. He modified the plan according to the impatience of the Gadhar militants to rush to action. Rash Behari and Pingle went to Lahore. Sachin tampered with the 7th Rajputs (Benares) and the 89th Punjabis at Dinapore. Damodar Sarup [Seth] went to Allahabad. Vinayak Rao Kapile conveyed bombs from Bengal to Punjab. Bibhuti [Haldar, approver] and Priyo Nath [Bhattacharya?] seduced the troops at Benares; Nalini [Mukherjee] at Jabalpur. On 14 February, Kapile carried from Benares to Lahore a parcel containing materials for 18 bombs.

By the middle of January, Pingle was back in Amritsar with "the fat babu" (Rash Behari); to avoid too many visitors, Rash Behari moved to Lahore after a fortnight. In both the places he collected materials for making bombs and ordered for 80 bomb cases to a foundry at Lahore. Its owner out of suspicion refused to execute the order. Instead, inkpots were used as cases in several of the dacoities. Completed bombs were found during house searches, while Rash Behari escaped. "By then effective contact had been established between the returned Gadharites and the revolutionaries led by Rash Behari, and a large section of soldiers in the NW were obviously disaffected." "It was expected that as soon as the signal was received there would be mutinies and popular risings from the Punjab to Bengal." "48 out of the 81 accused in the Lahore conspiracy case, including Rash Behari's close associates like Pingle, Mathura Singh & Kartar Singh Sarabha, recently arrived from North America."

Along with Rash Behari Bose, Sachin Sanyal and Kartar Singh Sarabha, Pingle became one of the main coordinators of the attempted mutiny in February 1915. Under Rash Behari, Pingle issued intensive propaganda for revolution from December 1914, sometimes disguised as Shyamlal, a Bengali; sometimes Ganpat Singh, a Punjabi. Confident of being able to rally the Indian sepoy, the plot for the mutiny took its final shape. The 23rd Cavalry in Punjab was to seize weapons and kill their officers while on roll call on 21 February. This was to be followed by mutiny in the 26th Punjab, which was to be the signal for the uprising to begin, resulting in an advance on Delhi and Lahore. The Bengal revolutionaries contacted the Sikh troops stationed at Dacca through letters of introduction sent by Sikh soldiers of Lahore, and succeeded in winning them over. The Bengal cell was to look for the Punjab Mail entering the Howrah Station the next day (which would have been cancelled if Punjab was seized) and was to strike immediately. However, the Punjab CID successfully infiltrated the conspiracy at the last moment through Kirpal Singh: a cousin of the trooper Balwant Singh (23rd Cavalry), US-returned Kirpal, a spy, visited Rash Behari's Lahore headquarters near the Mochi Gate, where over a dozen leaders including Pingle met on 15 February 1915. Kirpal informed the police. Sensing that their plans had been compromised, the D-day was brought forward to 19 February, but even these plans found their way to the Punjab CID. Plans for revolt by the 130th Baluchi Regiment at Rangoon on 21 February were thwarted. Attempted revolts in the 26th Punjab, 7th Rajput, 130th Baluch, 24th Jat Artillery and other regiments were suppressed. Mutinies in Firozpur, Lahore, and Agra were also suppressed and many key leaders of the conspiracy were arrested, although some managed to escape or evade arrest. A last-ditch attempt was made by Kartar Singh Sarabha and Pingle to trigger a mutiny in the 12th Cavalry regiment at Meerut. Kartar Singh Sarabha escaped from Lahore, but was arrested in Benares, and V. G. Pingle was apprehended from the lines of the 12th Cavalry at Meerut, in the night of 23 March 1915. He carried "ten bombs of the pattern used in the attempt to assassinate Lord Hardinge in Delhi," according to Mumbai police report. It is said that it was enough to blow up an entire regiment. Mass arrests followed as the Ghadarites were rounded up in Punjab and the Central Provinces. Rash Behari Bose escaped from Lahore and in May 1915 fled to Japan. Other leaders, including Giani Pritam Singh, Swami Satyananda Puri and others fled to Thailand or other sympathetic nations.

== Trial and execution ==
Vishnu Ganesh Pingle and a number of other Ghadarites including Kartar Singh Sarabha, Harnam Singh and Bhai Paramanand were tried in the Lahore Conspiracy trial in April 1915 by a special tribunal constituted under the Defence of India Act 1915, for their roles in the February plot. Pingle was executed by hanging at the Lahore Central Jail on 16 November 1915, along with Kartar Singh Sarabha and Pandit Kanshi Ram.

== Legacy ==
A street in central Mumbai suburb of Chinchpokli is named after him.

Pingle's granddaughter Rajni Patil is a politician. She has served as a Member of the Indian Parliament.
