= Munsha Singh Dukhi =

Indian national revolutionary and poet

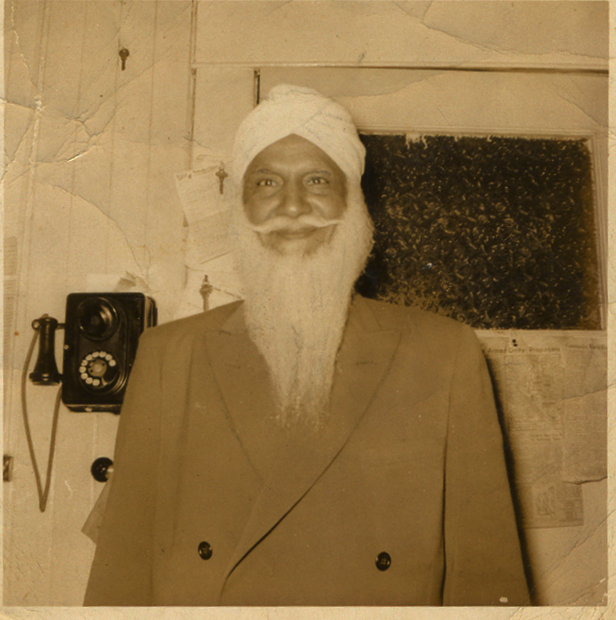
- Munsha Singh Dukhi
- Born: 1 July 1890; Jandiala, in Jalandhar district, Punjab, (British India)
- Died: 26 January 1971 (aged 80)
- Occupation: Revolutionary
- Organization: Ghadar Party
- Movement: Indian independence movement, Ghadar Conspiracy

Munsha Singh Dukhi (1 July 1890 – 26 January 1971) was an Indian national revolutionary and poet, who fought for the Independence of India from the British Empire. He belonged to the Ghadar Party. He was tried under third Lahore Conspiracy Case trial.

== Life ==
He was born on 1 July 1890 at Jandiala, in Jalandhar district of the British Punjab. He had his education informally, and acquired a good working knowledge of English, Urdu, Bengali, and Hindi.

== See also ==
- Lahore Conspiracy Case trial
- Ghadar Party
- Kartar Singh Sarabha
- Hindu–German Conspiracy

== Other sources ==
- Ghadar Party Da Itihas, Desh Bhagat Yaadgar Hall Committee, Jullundur
- Unpublished Account of Ghadar Party Conspiracy Cases, 1914–1918 by Isemonger and Slattery
