= British counter-intelligence against the Indian revolutionary movement during World War I =

British counter-intelligence against the Indian revolutionary movement during World War I began from its initial roots in the late-19th century and ultimately came to span in extent from Asia through Europe to the West Coast of the United States and Canada. It was effective in thwarting a number of attempts for insurrection in British India during World War I and ultimately in controlling the Indian revolutionary movement both at home and abroad.

== Background ==
During World War I, although Indian political bodies and populace largely came to support the British war effort, Bengal and Punjab remained hotbeds of anti colonial activities. Revolution in Bengal, increasingly closely linked with the unrests in Punjab, was significant enough to nearly paralyse the regional administration. Also from the beginning of the war, expatriate Indian population, notably from United States, Canada, and Germany, headed by the Berlin Committee and the Ghadar Party, attempted to trigger insurrections in India on the lines of the 1857 uprising with Irish Republican, German and Turkish help in a massive conspiracy that has since come to be called the Hindu–German Conspiracy This conspiracy also attempted to rally Afghanistan against British India. A number of failed attempts were made at mutiny, of which the February mutiny plan and the Singapore Mutiny remains most notable. This movement was suppressed by means of a massive international counter-intelligence operation and draconian political acts (including the Defence of India Act 1915) that lasted nearly ten years.

== Counter-intelligence ==
=== Beginnings ===
Outlines and nascent ideas of the conspiracy began to be noted and tracked by British intelligence as early as 1911. Incidents like the Delhi-Lahore Conspiracy and the Komagata Maru incident had already alerted the CID of the existence of a large-scale network and plans for pan-Indian militant unrest. Measures were taken which focussed on Bengal—the seat of the most intense revolutionary terrorism at the time—and on Punjab, which was uncovered as a strong and militant base in the wake of Komagata Maru. Har Dayal's extant group was found to have strong links with Rash Behari Bose, and were "cleaned up" in the wake of the Delhi bomb case.

=== In Asia ===
At the outbreak of the war, Punjab CID sent teams to Hong Kong to intercept and infiltrate the returning Ghadarites, who often made little efforts to hide their plans and objectives. These teams were successful in uncovering details of the full scale of the conspiracy, as well as discovering Har Dayal's whereabouts. Immigrants returning to India were double checked against a list of revolutionaries.

In Punjab, the CID, although aware of possible plans for unrest, was not successful in infiltrating the conspiracy for the mutiny until February 1915. A dedicated force was formed, headed by the Chief of Punjab CID, and including amongst its members Liaqat Hayat Khan (later head of Punjab CID himself). In February that year, the CID was successful in recruiting the services of one Kirpal Singh to infiltrate the plan. Singh, who had a Ghadarite cousin serving in the 23rd Cavalry, was able to infiltrate the leadership, being assigned to work in his cousin's regiment. Singh was soon under suspicion of being a spy, but was able to pass on the information regarding the date and scale of the uprising to British Indian intelligence. As the date for the mutiny approached, a desperate Rash Behari Bose brought forward the D-day to the evening of 19 February, which was discovered by Kirpal Singh on the very day. No attempts were made by the Ghadarites to restrain him, and he rushed to inform Liaqat Khan of the change of plans. Ordered back to his station to signal when the revolutionaries had assembled, Singh was detained by the would-be mutineers, but managed to make good his escape under the cover of answering the call of nature.

In Bengal, counter-intelligence, especially against the activities of Jugantar was led by Charles Tegart while the role of German or Baltic-German double-agents, especially the agent named Oren, was also important in infiltrating and preempting the plans for Autumn rebellions in Bengal in 1915 as well as scuttling Bagha Jatin's plans in winter that year. Jatin is believed to be personally shot by Tegart in his final battle on the banks of the river Burha Balang. Another source was the German double agent Vincent Kraft, a planter from Batavia, who passed information about arms shipments from Shanghai to British agents after being captured. Kraft later fled through Mexico to Japan where he was last known to be at the end of the war. Also arrested in November was a Javanese revolutionary by the name of Dekker while he travelled under the directions of the Berlin committee from Europe to Siam. He intended to work on publishing German war news and Indian revolutionary material to be smuggled into India via Burma. Later efforts by Mahendra Pratap's Provisional Government in Kabul were also compromised by Herambalal Gupta after he defected in 1918 and passed on information to Indian intelligence.

=== In Europe ===
British efforts against the Indian revolutionary movement and against German spy networks involved both the Special Branch as well as the MI5. A branch of the MI5 was formed early in the war to address the war time espionage operations The MI5 itself, working under Vernon Kell, had a number of India experts at the beginning of the war. In September 1916, a special section, the MI5(d), section was formed to operate counter-espionage networks throughout the British Empire. Another subsection, the MI5(b), was formed in January 1917 to deal specifically with Indians and "other oriental races". The MI5(g) subsection was formed through renaming the MO5(g) in 1916. The MI5(g) had 27 officers in its staff, eight of whom had served in India before the war. Among them were ex-Indian civil servants including Robert Nathan and H.L. Stephenson. Nathan began his work for British intelligence against Indian revolutionaries in October 1914. After retiring from the ICS in 1915, Nathan joined the MI5(g). Nathan's fellow officer at the time was another ex-Indian police official by the name of HL Stephenson. He headed at the time the political branch of the Secret service, and along with Basil Thomson who headed the Special Branch of the Scotland Yard, Nathan was closely involved in the interrogation of Indians who worked along with the Germans during the war. The main emphasis of this counter-espionage network was to prevent the subversion of Indian troops in the European theatre. The organisation, especially under Nathan, worked closely with the Special Branch of the Scotland Yard in Britain and with the Indian Political Intelligence Office headed by John Wallinger, which operated a network of spies in neutral Switzerland which a number of the Indian revolutionaries and members of the Berlin Committee used as a base.

Virendranath Chattopadhaya

By the time the war broke out an Indian Intelligence office, headed by John Wallinger, had been opened in Europe. In scale this office was larger than those operated by the British War Office, approaching the European intelligence network of the Secret Service Bureau. This network already had agents in Switzerland against possible German intrigues. After the outbreak of the war Wallinger, under the cover of an officer of the British General Headquarters, proceeded to France where he operated out of Paris, working with the French Political Police, the Sûreté. Among other enterprises, the European intelligence network attempted to eliminate some of the Indian leaders in Europe. A British agent called Donald Gullick was dispatched to assassinate Virendranath Chattopadhaya while the latter was on his way to Geneva to meet Mahendra Pratap to offer Kaiser Wilhelm II's invitation. It is said that Somerset Maugham, who was in the British Secret Service in Europe during the war, based a number of his stories on his first-hand experiences, modelling the character of John Ashenden after himself and Chandra Lal after Virendranath. The short story of Giulia Lazzari is a blend of Gullick's attempts to assassinate Virendranath and Mata Hari's story. Winston Churchill reportedly advised Maugham to burn 14 other stories. MI5(g)'s work at the time identified the plans by Ghadar Party and the Berlin Committee to assassinate Lord Kitchener in 1915 through an associate of Har Dayal, Gobind Behari Lal. It was also responsible at this time, along with Basil Thomson, for the capture of Harish Chandra (who was associated with the Berlin Committee) and turning him into a double agent. Through Harish Chandra was also identified plans for obtaining information of Ghadarite intrigues in Japan and China. Among other works, Nathan was responsible for the plans made by British intelligence in late 1915 to assassinate Virendranath Chattopadhyaya through an agent by the name of Donald Gullick.

Nathan's efforts, along with those of John Wallinger's Indian Political Intelligence Office (who Nathan worked closely with), were key in the British counter-espionage work. Nathan's work at the time identified the plans by Ghadar Party and the Berlin Committee to assassinate Lord Kitchener in 1915 through an associate of Har Dayal, Gobind Behari Lal. He was also responsible at this time, along with Basil Thomson, to turn Harish Chandra (who was associated with the Berlin Committee) into a double agent. Among other works, Nathan was responsible for the plans made by British intelligence in late 1915 to assassinate Virendranath Chattopadhyaya through an agent by the name of Donald Gullick.

=== Middle East ===
In the Middle East, British counter-intelligence was directed at preserving the loyalty of the Indian sepoy in the face of Turkish propaganda and the concept of The Caliph's Jihad, while a particularly significant effort was directed at intercepting the Kabul Mission. The East Persian Cordon was established in July 1915 in the Sistan province of Persia to prevent the Germans from crossing into Afghanistan and to protect British supply caravans in Sarhad from the Damani, Reki and Kurdish Baluchi tribal raiders who might be tempted by German gold. Among the commanders of the Sistan force was Reginald Dyer who led it between March and October 1916.

=== In the United States ===
In the United States, the conspiracy was successfully infiltrated by British intelligence through both Irish as well as Indian channels. The activities of Ghadar on the Pacific coast were noted by W. C. Hopkinson, who had grown up in India and spoke fluent Hindi. Initially W.C.H. had been despatched from Calcutta to keep the Indian Police informed about the doings of Taraknath Das. The Home department of the British Indian government had begun the task of actively tracking Indian seditionists on the East Coast as early as 1910. Francis Cunliffe Owen, the officer heading the Home Office agency in New York City, had become thoroughly acquainted with George Freeman alias Fitzgerald and Myron Phelps, the famous New York advocate, as members of the Clan-na-Gael. Owens' efforts were successful in thwarting the SS Moraitis plan. The Ghadar Party was incidentally established after Irish Republicans, sensing infiltration, encouraged formation of an exclusively Indian society. Following this, a number of approaches were adopted, including infiltration through a "Native" Indian intelligence officer by the name of Bela Singh who successfully set up a network of agents passing on information to British intelligence, as well as the use of the famous American Pinkerton's detective agency. W. C. Hopkinson himself was assassinated in a court in Victoria by a Ghadarite named Mewa Singh in October 1914.

Later, on instructions from British secret service, Robert Nathan transferred his work to the Pacific coast North America where the Ghadar Party worked closely with the German consulate at San Francisco to obtain arms and men for what came to be known as the Ghadar Conspiracy. Working with Thomas J Tunney, the head of New York Bomb Squad, Nathan's works successfully brought the Ghadarites and staff at the German consulate to trial following the Annie Larsen arms plot. He organised the Hindu-German conspiracy trial, which at the time was the longest in merican legal history. He was responsible for the arrest of Chandra Kanta Chakraverty and his subsequent interrogation, along with that Ernst Sekunna. Through March 1917, Nathan worked closely with William Wiseman, and negotiated with the US State Department the details of the case against the Indian conspirators. He strongly supported granting the guarantee to the United States of not being held responsible for violation of neutrality. An Irish double agent by the name of Charles Lamb is said to have passed on the majority of the information that compromised the Annie Larsen and ultimately helped the construction of the prosecution. An Indian operative, codenamed "C" and described most likely to have been the adventurous Chandra Kanta Chakravarty (later the chief prosecution witness in the trial), also passed on the details of the conspiracy to British and American intelligence.

The Czech revolutionary network in Europe also had a role in the uncovering of Bagha Jatin's plans. The network was in touch with the members in the United States, and may have also been aware of and involved in the uncovering of the earlier plots. The American network, headed by E.V. Voska, was a counter-espionage network of nearly 80 members who, as Habsburg subjects, were presumed to be German supporters but were involved in spying on German and Austrian diplomats. Voska had begun working with Guy Gaunt, who headed Courtenay Bennett's intelligence network, at the outbreak of the war and on learning of the plot from the Czech European network, passed on the information to Gaunt and to Tomáš Masaryk who further passed on the information the American authorities.

== Impact ==
The British counter-intelligence operations effectively thwarted attempts within and from outside India, and ultimately was able to bring the Ghadar Party into the attention of American intelligence, while its counter-subversion within the Berlin committee and the Indian movement effectively broke the groups up and prevented a cohesive plan for being put into place.
