= Lala Ram Saran Das Talwar =

Indian revolutionary (1888–1963)

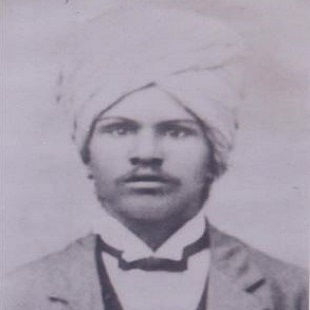
- Born: 24 August 1888; Kapurthala, Punjab
- Died: 1963 (aged 74–75)
- Notable work: Dreamland
- Political party: Ghadar Party
- Movement: Indian independence movement
- Father: Sant Ram

Lala Ram Saran Das (1888–1963) was a Ghadar Party revolutionary involved in the Ghadar Mutiny.

== Biography ==
He was born in Kapurthala, Punjab in British India to a middle-class family.

In 1905, he became involved in the independence movement after the partition of Bengal. He joined the Ghadar party citing its clear idea to replace British government with republican government. On deportation of Lala Rajpat Rai and S. Ajit Singh to Mandalay in 1907 July–August, he formed revolutionary secret society in Punjab in October.

Lala Ram Saran Das was convicted for life in 1915 in the first Lahore Conspiracy Case. He spent 6 years in cellular jail and 6 more year in Salem central prison, Madras presidency. He was unconditionally released in 1927, after which he contacted Bhagat Singh and Sukhdev and became part of HSRA. He was arrested again in connection with the second LCC. This time he wavered and accepted king's pardon.However he retracted his statement and was charged of perjury. He was convicted for two years which was subsequently reduced to six months in appeal. During this conviction that he passed on his Dreamland poem manuscript to Bhagat Singh for an introduction.

On 29 February 1929, he attended the Naujawan Bharat Sabha meeting and delivered a lecture criticising British rule. Because of his nationalistic activities, authorities ordered him to provide Rs. 5000 in security to remain silent for two years and refrain from leaving Kapurthala without permission. He was arrested and forced to become an approver in the Lahore Conspiracy Case, but he later recanted his statement. For this, on 13 March 1933, he was charged under Section 193 of the Indian Penal Code and sentenced to two years in prison and a fine of Rs. 500.

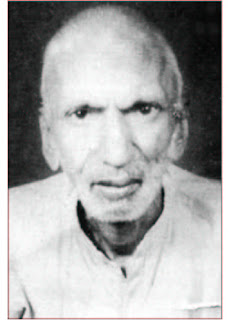
L. Ram in his later years

He was interned and sent to jail again and again until 1947 when the British India was partitioned into the Dominion of India and Dominion of Pakistan. Due to shattered health, he retired from politics in June 1954.
