= Why I Am =

"Why I Am" is a song by Dave Matthews Band from their album Big Whiskey & the GrooGrux King

Why I Am and Why I Am Not may refer to:

== Why I Am ==
- Why I Am an Atheist, an essay by Indian revolutionary Bhagat Singh, published in 1930.
- Why I Am Still a Christian is a book by Catholic theologian Hans Küng, published in 1987.
- Why I Am a Christian, is a 2003 book by English author John Stott.
- Why I Am an Atheist is an essay by Indian revolutionary Bhagat Singh, published in 1930.

== Why I Am Not ==
- Why I Am Not a Conservative, an essay by Austrian School economist Friedrich Hayek, published in 1960.
- Why I Am Not a Christian, by philosopher and independent scholar Richard Carrier
- Why I Am Not a Communist, by Karel Čapek, a 1924 essay in Přítomnost magazine.
- Why I Am Not a Conservative is an essay by Austrian School economist Friedrich Hayek, published in 1960.
- Why I Am Not a Hindu, a 1996 book in a similar vein by Kancha Ilaiah, an activist opposed to the Indian caste system.
- Why I Am Not a Muslim, by Ibn Warraq, is a 1995 book also critical of the religion in which the author was brought up — in this case, Islam. The author mentions Why I Am Not a Christian towards the end of the first chapter, stating that many of its arguments also apply to Islam.
- Why I Am Not a Property Dualist, an essay by John Searle in which he criticises the philosophical position of property dualism.
- Why I Am Not a Scientist (2009) ISBN 0-520-25960-2, by biological anthropologist Jonathan M. Marks

== Similar titles ==
- How I Stopped Being a Jew, is a 2014 book by Israeli historian Shlomo Sand.
