= Baba Gurmukh Singh =

Indian revolutionary (1888–1977)

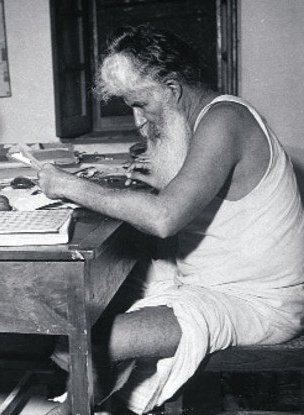
Baba Gurmukh Singh (Ghadar Party) photographed in 1946

Baba Gurmukh Singh (1888 – 13 March 1977) was a Ghadr revolutionary and a Sikh leader.

== Biography ==
Singh was born in Lalton Khurd, in the Ludhiana district. He studied up to matriculation at a church Mission School of Ludhiana and was a school-mate of Kartar Singh Sarabha. He attempted to join the army, but he could not be enlisted for medical reasons.

=== Komagata Maru ===
In 1914, he boarded the ship Komagata Maru after being hired by a Japanese firm to go to Canada. At Hong Kong, he learned about the new restrictions imposed by the Canadian Government. Upon reaching Canada, the passengers were not allowed to disembark, and had to return to India. The ship landed at the Budge Budge Ghat in Calcutta, a clash occurred between the passengers and the local police. Gurmukh Singh escaped and was captured three days later and imprisoned in the Alipur jail. Three months later, he was brought to the Punjab.

=== Ghadr movement ===
While placed under orders of internment, under the influence of Kartar Singh Sarabha and Rash Bihari Bose he made efforts to establish secret contacts with Indian soldiers in some of the Punjab cantonments. But all plans of Gurmukh Singh and his companions went awry on account of betrayal of one of their colleagues.

He was arrested among the many revolutionaries after the disclosure of the plot and was incarcerated in the Lahore Central Jail and tried in the First Lahore Conspiracy Case along with others. He was sentenced to kala pani on the Andaman Islands. He jumped off a running train when he was being transferred from Madras to UP in 1922 and escaped to the Punjab. Within the span of a few years, he had proceeded to Kabul via Khybr Pass in company with Teja Singh Swatantar.

In 1934, after he came back he was arrested again on suspicion of being in correspondence with Ghadrites and transported to Kala Pani to complete the remainder of his incarceration which was now increased by six months for his misconduct.

He remained in confinement on the Andaman Islands until 1945, after which he was transferred to the Punjab and stayed in the Multan jail. From there he was released in 1947 after India achieved independence.

== See also ==
- Indian independence activists
