= Pandit Kanshi Ram =

Indian revolutionary leader (1883–1915)

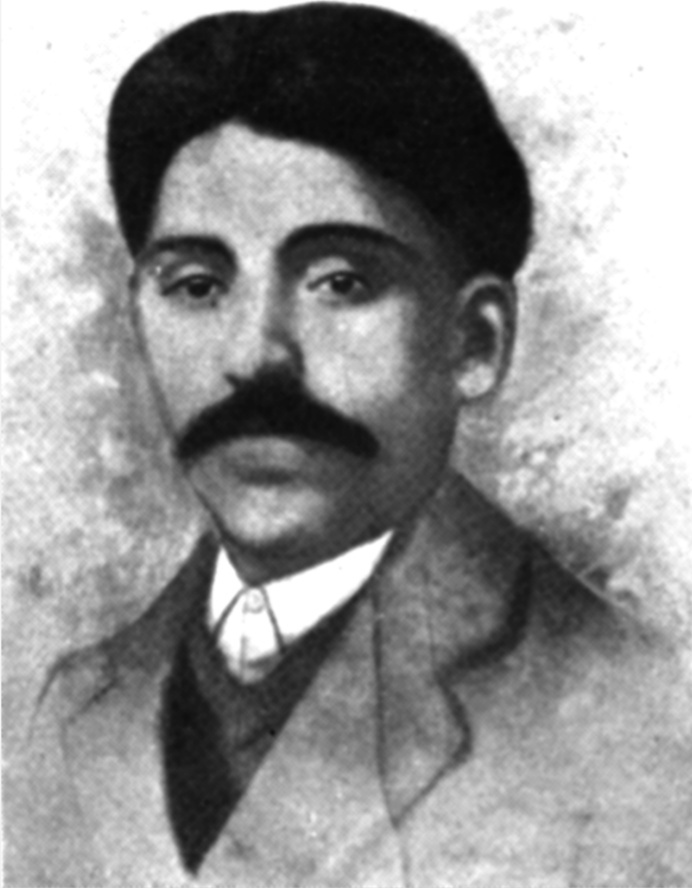
- Born: 13 October 1883; Marauli Kalan, Punjab Province, British Raj, India (Present day Rupnagar District, Punjab)
- Died: 27 March 1915 (aged 31); Lahore, Punjab Province, British India (now Punjab, Pakistan)
- Cause of death: Execution by hanging
- Organization: Ghadar Party
- Movement: Indian Independence movement, Ghadar Conspiracy

Pandit Kanshi Ram (13 October 1883 – 27 March 1915) was an Indian revolutionary who, along with Har Dayal and Sohan Singh Bhakna, was one of the three key members in founding the Ghadar Party. He served as the treasurer of the party from its foundation in 1913 to 1914. In 1914, Ram returned to India as a part of the Ghadar Mutiny, which attempted to trigger mutinies in the British Indian Army during World War I. He was arrested in the aftermath of the failed February plot and later tried in the Lahore conspiracy trial. Ram was charged, along with Kartar Singh Sarabha and Vishnu Ganesh Pingle, and executed on 27 March 1915.
