= Kirpal Singh (spy) =

British Indian Army soldier

Kirpal Singh was a soldier of the British Indian Army who is best known for his role in passing on to the Punjab Criminal Investigation Department (CID) the intelligence on the date of the Ghadar Conspiracy in February 1915 during World War I.

The CID recruited the services of Kirpal Singh in early 1915 following the reports and intelligence it received on the proposed plans for instigating revolt in the British Indian Army in Punjab. Singh, who had a Ghadarite cousin serving in the 23rd Cavalry, was able to infiltrate the leadership, being assigned to work in his cousin's regiment. Singh was soon under suspicion of being a spy, but was able to pass on the information regarding the date and scale of the uprising to British Indian intelligence.

As the date for the mutiny approached, a desperate Rash Behari Bose brought forward the D-day to the evening of 19 February, which was discovered by Kirpal Singh on the very day. No attempts were made by the Ghadarites to restrain him, and he rushed to inform Liaqat Khan of the change of plans. Ordered back to his station to signal when the revolutionaries had assembled, Singh was detained by the would-be mutineers, but managed to make good his escape under the cover of answering the call of nature.
