= Harnam Singh Saini =

Indian revolutionary

- Born: Fategarh village, Hoshiarpur, Punjab
- Died: 16 March 1917; Lahore, British India
- Organization: Ghadar Party
- Movement: Indian independence movement, Ghadar Conspiracy

Harnam Singh Saini (died 16 March 1917) was a notable Indian revolutionary who participated in the Ghadar Conspiracy and was hanged by British colonial government on 16 March 1917 in Lahore for instigating revolt against the empire. He was tried in the third Lahore Conspiracy Case trial.

== Background ==
Harnam Singh Saini was the son of Gopal Saini. He was a resident of village Fatehgarh in district Hoshiarpur.

== Involvement in the Ghadar conspiracy ==
Harnam Singh visited Canada and the US, which were the breeding ground of the Ghadar Conspiracy. He became an active member of the Ghadar Party and participated in sedition.

== Arrest ==
Harnam Singh Saini was arrested in Batavia, a Dutch colony. Nothing incriminating was found on his person or on the ship Maverick in which he was travelling. In spite of this the Dutch authorities of Batavia heeded to the British request and handed him over to the Singapore police. He was taken to Calcutta and then to Lahore.

== Trial and execution ==
He was tried in the third conspiracy case at Lahore. The tribunal of this case consisted of Ellis, Major Frizelle, and Rai Bahadur Gopal Das Bhandari. The trial was held in Lahore Central Jail.

The trial began on 8 November 1916 and ended on 5 January 1917. Harnam Singh Saini along with four other Ghadar revolutionaries, Bhai Balwant Singh of Khurdpur, Babu Ram of Fatehgarh, Hafiz Abdullah of Jagraon, and Dr. Arur Singh of Sanghowal, was charged with waging war against the King and Emperor, and sentenced to death. Three other accused, namely, Karar Singh Nawan Chand, Fazal Din of Fategarh and Munsha Singh Dukhi of Jandiala were given life imprisonment.

Saini, along with four of his other Ghadar Party comrades, was executed on 16 March 1917. All of their properties were also confiscated.

== See also ==
- List of Saini people
- Lahore Conspiracy Case trial
- Ghadar Party
- Kartar Singh Sarabha
- Hindu–German Conspiracy

== Other sources ==
- Ghadar Party Da Itihas, Desh Bhagat Yaadgar Hall Committee, Jullundur
- Unpublished Account of Ghadar Party Conspiracy Cases, 1914–1918 by Isemonger and Slattery
- Sir Michael O'Dwyer, India as I knew it, London, 1925
