= Why I Am an Atheist =

Essay by Bhagat Singh

Why I Am an Atheist (Hindi: मैं नास्तिक क्यों हूँ) is an essay written by Indian revolutionary Bhagat Singh in 1930 in the Lahore Central Jail. The essay was a reply to his religious friends who thought Bhagat Singh became an atheist because of his vanity.

== Background ==
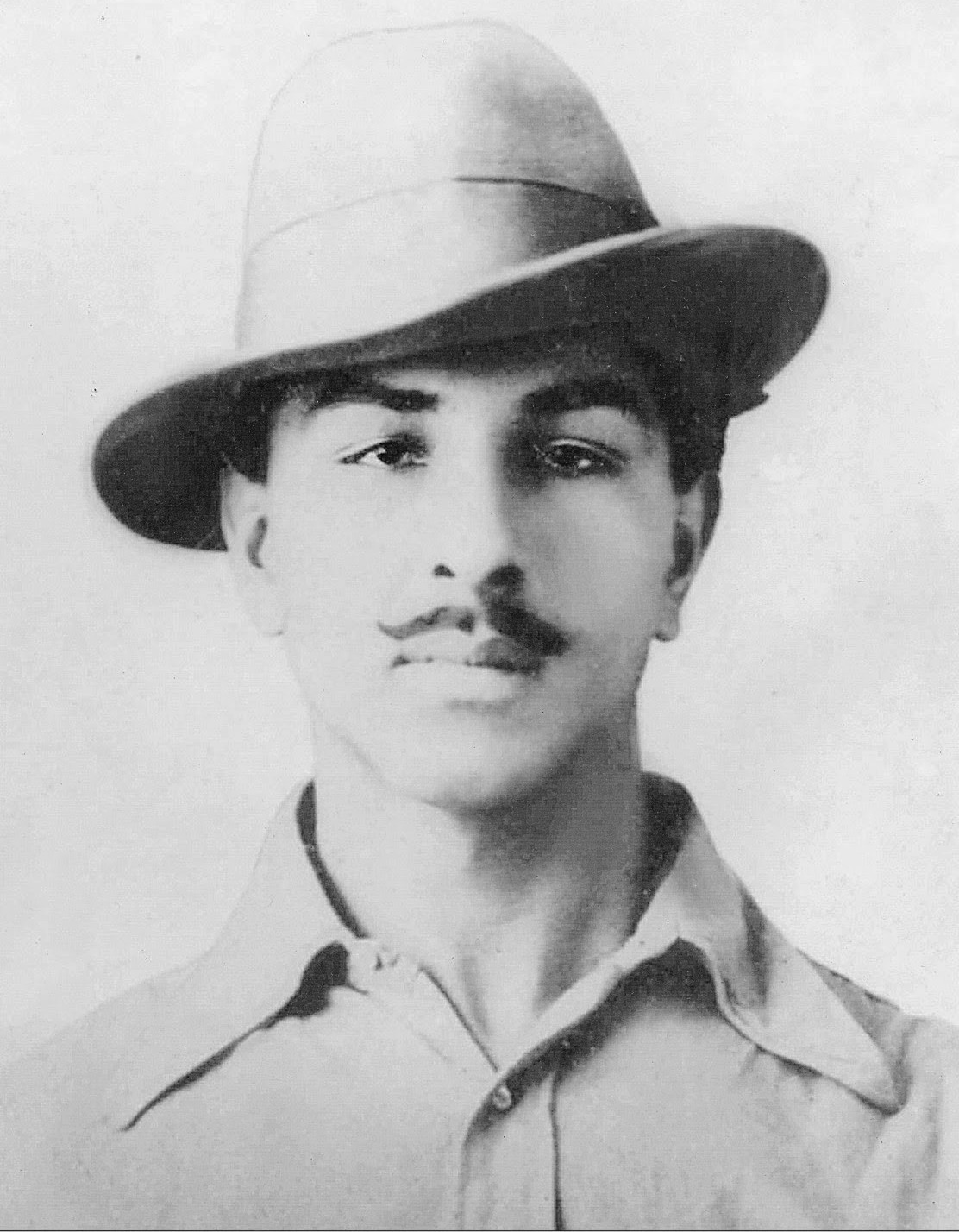
Bhagat Singh in 1929

Bhagat Singh was a member of Hindustan Socialist Republican Association, a revolutionary party in the Indian freedom struggle. He was an atheist who believed in socialism, and he wrote several articles on anarchism and socialism for Kirti. He was arrested on 8 April 1929 in connection with the Central Legislative Assembly bombing case and was sentenced to 14 years life imprisonment. He was re-arrested in connection with the murder of John Saunders, a deputy superintendent of police who was killed by Sukhdev, Rajguru, and Bhagat Singh in 1928 in retaliation for the death of Lala Lajpat Rai. In that case, the trial began and he was transferred to Lahore jail. In the jail, on 4 October 1930, Baba Randhir Singh, a religious man and member of Ghadar Party who was convicted in the first Lahore conspiracy case, met Bhagat Singh and tried to incite his belief in God; however, Bhagat Singh did not change his stance. Thereafter, Randhir Singh said "You are giddy with fame and have developed an ego which is standing like a black curtain between you and the God". As a reply to Randhir Singh, he wrote this essay on 5 and 6 October 1930. On 7 October 1930, all three of the defendants were convicted in the murder of Saunders and sentenced to death. On 23 March 1931, they were executed by hanging in the Lahore jail (present-day Shadman Chowk or Bhagat Singh Chowk).

== Publication ==
After the death of Singh, the essay was published on 27 September 1931 in Lala Lajpat Rai's English weekly The People.

=== Tamil version ===
On the request of Periyar E. V. Ramasamy, P. Jeevanandham translated the essay to the Tamil language. The Tamil version of the essay was published in Kudi Arasu in 1935. According to Chaman Lal, "at one time after Partition, the English copy of this essay was not found anywhere. It was then re-translated from Tamil to English, and some websites still carry the re-translated English version of this essay".

== Content ==
In the essay, Bhagat Singh states that his atheism was not a result of vanity. He mentions that his family were firm believers in God, that he himself grew up as a religious boy who would chant prayers for hours and goes on to explain how despite this he went on to become an atheist. He mentions that his atheism was also not a result of his association with a revolutionary organization and that most of his comrades were in fact theists, citing the example of Sachindra Nath Sanyal who was a firm believer in God. An excerpt from the essay reads:

Later still I came across a book entitled Common Sense by Nirlamba Swami. It was only a sort of mystic atheism. This subject became of utmost interest to me. By the end of 1926 I had been convinced as to the baselessness of the theory of existence of an almighty supreme being ..

He mentions Mikhail Bakunin's manuscript, God and the State and Common Sense by Niralamba Swami to have inspired his own atheism.

He also questions theists about the existence of God:

If, as you believe, there is an almighty, omnipresent, omniscient and omnipotent God, who created the earth or world, please let me know why did he create it? This world of woes and miseries, a veritable, eternal combination of numberless tragedies: Not a single soul being perfectly satisfied.

Continuing on the above question, he also asks, "I ask why your omnipotent God does not stop every man when he is committing any sin or offence? He can do it quite easily. Why did he not kill warlords or kill the fury of war in them and thus avoid the catastrophe hurled down on the head of humanity by the Great War? Why does he not just produce a certain sentiment in the mind of the British people to liberate India? Why does he not infuse the altruistic enthusiasm in the hearts of all capitalists to forego their rights of personal possessions of means of production and thus redeem the whole labouring community —nay, the whole human society, from the bondage of capitalism? You want to reason out the practicability of socialist theory; I leave it for your almighty to enforce it. People recognise the merits of socialism in as much as the general welfare is concerned. They oppose it under the pretext of its being impracticable. Let the Almighty step in and arrange everything in an orderly fashion."

In the end, he also comments on the origin of God and thinks it is due to man's limitation, weakness and shortcoming to face trying circumstances. He differs on the origin of God from other radicals who attribute the origin of God to "the ingenuity of the exploiters who wanted to keep the people under their subjection by preaching the existence of a supreme being and then claiming an authority and sanction from him for their privileged positions."

On the subject of origin of life and humanity, he comments, "This is a phenomenon of nature. The accidental mixture of different substances in the shape of nebulae produced this earth. When? Consult history. The same process produced animals and, in the long run, man. Read Darwin's Origin of Species. And all the later progress is due to man's constant conflict with nature and his efforts to override it. This is the briefest possible explanation of the phenomenon."
