= Maya Singh Saini =

Indian freedom-fighter

Maya Singh Saini, sometimes spelt as Mayya Singh Saini, was a notable Indian freedom-fighter from Naushahra in Amritsar district of the Punjab. Maya Singh Saini was an initially a cavalryman and fought in the battle of Ramnagar on 22 November 1848 during the second Anglo-Sikh war. Although the battle of Ramnagar was inconclusive, the Sikh cavalry caused heavy damage to the British forces, which proved to be a great morale booster for the Sikhs.

Thereafter he joined volunteer corps of Bhai Maharaj Singh, the leader of the popular revolt against the British. He participated in the battles of Sa`dullapur and Gujrat. After the defeat of the Sikh forces, Maya Singh was in Bhai Maharaj Singh's train at Sujoval near Balala. From the latter place he was sent to Lahore on a mission, and thus escaped arrest when Maharaja Bhagvan Singh and his companions were captured on the night of 28 and 29 December 1849. He, however, fell into the hands of the British soon afterwards his series of ambushes of British and Native Infantry and cavalry trains passing through Majha and Malwa 1849-1851.

== See also ==
- Saini
- Harnam Singh Saini
- Gurdan Saini

== Bibliography ==
- Ahluwalia, M.L., Bhai Maharaj Singh. Patiala, 1992
- Kirpal Singh, Bhdl Maharaj Singh : Panjab de Modhi Swatantarta Sangramie. Amritsar, 1966.
- Harbans Singh, The Sikh Encyclopedia, Punjabi University, Patiala
