= Ingress into India Ordinance, 1914 =

- Status: Repealed

The Ingress into India Ordinance, 1914, a law passed in British India in September 1914, at the outset of World War I, allowed the Government of India to screen, detain, and restrict the movement of people returning to India.

The main aim of the act was to detain and restrict Sikh immigrants returning from Canada and the United States under plans made by the Ghadar Party to initiate rebellion against British rule in India with help from Imperial Germany. It was first applied against the passengers of the Komagata Maru upon her arrival at Calcutta, and subsequently against Ghadarites who attempted to return to India through other ports throughout the war. The ordinance was also used to detain and deport suspected Ghadarites as far away as Shanghai back to their villages in Punjab for internment.

Coordinating with British Intelligence services in North America led by W. C. Hopkinson, authorities in India were able to compile lists of suspected Ghadarites who had set sail from North America for India, and passengers disembarking at Indian ports were subjected to the ordinance. As a uniform rule all emigrants from North America as well as Hong Kong, Shanghai, and Manila were restricted.

The ordinance was preceded and applied with a similar ordinance, the Foreigners Ordinance, which restricted the liberty of foreigners attempting to enter British India in a similar manner. Along with the Defence of India Act 1915, the ordinance was applied in a large scale throughout the war to stave off the threat from the revolutionary movement in India.

The Rowlatt Committee estimated that between 1914 and 1917, the ordinance was used to intern nearly three hundred people, while a further two thousand two hundred were restricted to their villages, mainly in Punjab.

== Bibliography ==
- Pati, Budheshwar (1996), India and the First World War, Atlantic Publishers and Distributors, ISBN 8171565816
- Yong, Tan Tai (2005), The Garrison State:Military, Government and Society in Colonial Punjab 1849–1947, Sage Publications India, ISBN 0-7619-3336-0
- Popplewell, Richard J. (1995), Intelligence and Imperial Defence: British Intelligence and the Defence of the Indian Empire 1904–1924, Routledge, ISBN 0-7146-4580-X
- Song, Min (2004), Asian American Studies: A Reader, Rutgers State University, ISBN 0-8135-2725-2
- Sohi, Seema (2014), Echoes of Mutiny: Race, Surveillance, and Indian Anticolonialism in North America, Oxford University Press, ISBN 978-0-19-937624-7
