= Sachindra Nath Sanyal =

Indian revolutionary (1890–1942)

- শচীন্দ্রনাথ সান্যাল
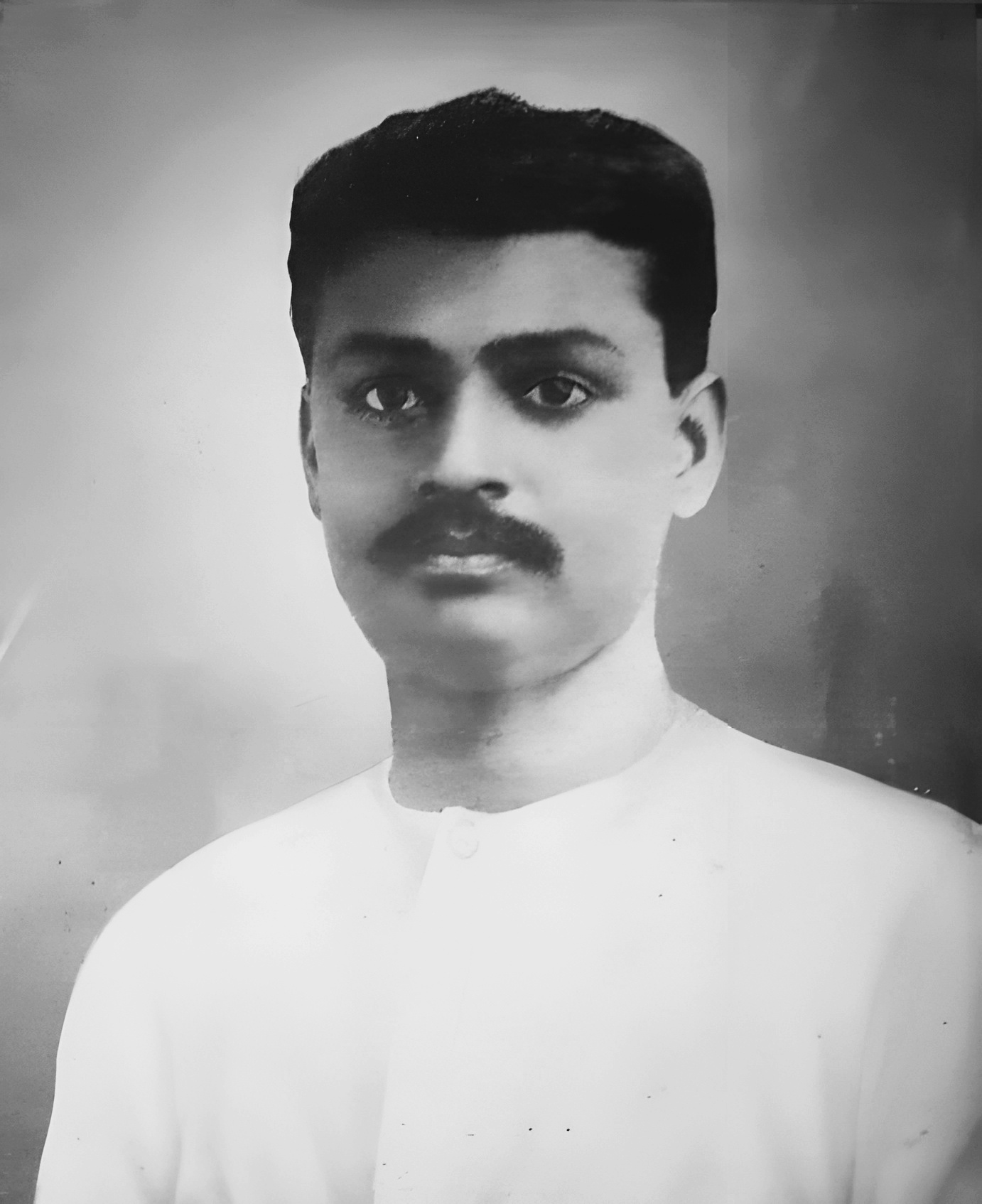
- Sachindra Nath Sanyal
- Born: 3 June 1893; Benares, North-Western Provinces, British India
- Died: 7 February 1942 (aged 48); Gorakhpur, United Provinces, British India
- Occupation: Revolutionary
- Organization(s): Anushilan Samiti, Ghadar Party, Hindustan Socialist Republican Association
- Notable work: A Life of Captivity (Bandi Jeevan)
- Movement: Indian revolutionary movement
- Criminal penalty: Capital punishment
- Criminal status: Jailed
- Relatives: Sanjeev Sanyal (grand nephew)

Sachindra Nath Sanyal (3 June 1893 — 7 February 1942) was an Indian revolutionary, freedom fighter, and founding member of the Hindustan Republican Association (HRA), later the Hindustan Socialist Republican Association (HSRA). Born into a Bengali migrant family in Varanasi, he became active in the Anushilan Samiti and was a close associate of Rash Behari Bose. Sanyal played a key role in the 1915 Ghadar Conspiracy and mentored revolutionaries like Bhagat Singh and Chandra Shekhar Azad. Twice sentenced to the Cellular Jail, he remained committed to India’s liberation through armed resistance. He died of tuberculosis while under internment in Gorakhpur in 1942.

== Early and personal life ==
Sachindra Nath Sanyal's parents were Varendra Bengali Brahmins. His father was Hari Nath Sanyal and his mother was Kherod Vasini Devi. He was born in Benares, then in North-Western Provinces, on 3 June 1893 and married Pratibha Sanyal, with whom he had one son.

== Revolutionary career ==
Sanyal founded a branch of the Anushilan Samiti in Patna in 1913. In 1912 Delhi Conspiracy Trial Sanyal along with Basanta Kumar Biswas and Rashbehari Bose attacked the then Viceroy Hardinge while he was making entry into new capital of Delhi after annulment of Bengal Partition. Hardinge was injured but lady Hardinge was unscathed.

He was extensively involved in the plans for the Ghadar conspiracy, and went underground after it was exposed in February 1915. He was a close associate of Rash Behari Bose. After Bose escaped to Japan, Sanyal was considered the most senior leader of India's revolutionary movement.

Sanyal was sentenced to life - term imprisonment for his involvement in the conspiracy and was imprisoned at Cellular Jail in the Andaman and Nicobar Islands, where he wrote his book titled Bandi Jeevan (A Life of Captivity, 1922). He was briefly released from jail but when he continued to engage in anti-British activities, he was sent back and his ancestral family home in Benaras was confiscated.

Following the end of the Non-cooperation movement in 1922, Sanyal, Ram Prasad Bismil and some other revolutionaries who wanted an independent India and were prepared to use force to achieve their goal, founded the Hindustan Republican Association in October 1924. He was the author of the HRA manifesto, titled The Revolutionary, that was distributed in large cities of North India on 1 January 1925.

Sanyal was jailed for his involvement in the Kakori conspiracy but was among those conspirators released from Naini Central Prison in August 1937. Thus, Sanyal has the unique distinction of having been sent to the Cellular Jail in Port Blair twice. He contracted tuberculosis in jail and was sent to Gorakhpur Jail for his final months. He died on 7 February 1942.

== Beliefs ==
Sanyal and Mahatma Gandhi engaged in a famous debate published in Young India between 1920 and 1924. Sanyal argued against Gandhi's gradualist approach.

Sanyal was known for his firm Hindu beliefs, although most of his followers were Marxists and thus opposed to religions. Bhagat Singh discusses Sanyal's beliefs in his tract Why I am an Atheist. Jogesh Chandra Chatterjee was a close associate of Sanyal. He was also supplied with guns by Maulana Shaukat Ali, who was at that time a supporter of Congress and its non-violent methods but not with the same fervor for non-violence that was expressed by his organization's leader, Gandhi. Another prominent Congressman, Krishna Kant Malaviya, also supplied him with weapons.

== Death ==
Sanyal participated in anti-British programs, which resulted in a second prison term and government seizure of his Benares property. He died of tuberculosis while serving his second term in prison on 7 February 1942.

== Legacy ==
He was featured in The Revolutionaries (TV series).
