= Ghadar Mutiny =

1915 plan for a British Indian Army mutiny

The Ghadar Mutiny, also known as the Ghadar Conspiracy, was a plan to initiate a pan-India mutiny in the British Indian Army in February 1915 to end the British Raj in India. The plot originated at the onset of World War I, between the Ghadar Party in the United States, the Berlin Committee in Germany, the Indian revolutionary underground in British India and the German Foreign Office through the consulate in San Francisco. The incident derives its name from the North American Ghadar Party, whose members of the Punjabi community in Canada and the United States were among the most prominent participants in the plan. It was the most prominent amongst a number of plans of the much larger Hindu–German Mutiny, formulated between 1914 and 1917 to initiate a Pan-Indian rebellion against the British Raj during World War I. The mutiny was planned to start in the key state of Punjab, followed by mutinies in Bengal and rest of India. Indian units as far as Singapore were planned to participate in the rebellion. The plans were thwarted through a coordinated intelligence and police response. British intelligence infiltrated the Ghadarite movement in Canada and in India, and last-minute intelligence from a spy helped crush the planned uprising in Punjab before it started. Key figures were arrested, and mutinies in smaller units and garrisons within India were also crushed.

Intelligence about the threat of the mutiny led to a number of important war-time measures introduced in India, including the passages of the Foreigners Ordinance, 1914, the Ingress into India Ordinance, 1914, and the Defence of India Act 1915. The conspiracy was followed by the First Lahore Conspiracy Trial and Benares Conspiracy Trial which saw death sentences awarded to a number of Indian revolutionaries, and the exile of a number of others. After the end of the war, fear of a second Ghadarite uprising led to the passage of the Rowlatt Act, followed by the Jallianwala Bagh massacre.

== Background ==
World War I began with an unprecedented outpouring of loyalty and goodwill towards the United Kingdom from within the mainstream political leadership. Contrary to initial British fears of an Indian revolt, India contributed massively to the British war effort by providing men and resources. About 1.3 million Indian soldiers and labourers served in Europe, Africa, and the Middle East, while both the Indian government and the princes sent large supplies of food, money, and ammunition.

However, Bengal and Punjab remained hotbeds of anti colonial activities. Militancy in Bengal, increasingly closely linked with the unrest in Punjab, was significant enough to nearly paralyse the regional administration. Also, from the beginning of the war, an expatriate Indian population, notably from the United States, Canada, and Germany, headed by the Berlin Committee and the Ghadar Party, attempted to trigger insurrections in India along the lines of the 1857 uprising with Irish Republican, German and Turkish help in a massive conspiracy that has since come to be called the Hindu–German Mutiny This conspiracy also attempted to rally Afghanistan against British India.

A number of failed attempts were made at mutiny, of which the February mutiny plan and the Singapore Mutiny remain most notable. This movement was suppressed by means of a massive international counter-intelligence operation and draconian political acts (including the Defence of India Act 1915) that lasted nearly ten years.

== Indian nationalism in the United States ==
Early works towards Indian nationalism in the United States dates back to the first decade of the 20th century, when, following the example of London's India House, similar organisations were opened in the United States and in Japan through the efforts of the then growing Indian student population in the country. Shyamji Krishna Varma, the founder of India House, had built close contacts with the Irish Republican movement. The first of the nationalist organisations was the Pan-Aryan Association, modelled after Krishna Varma's Indian Home Rule Society, opened in 1906 through the joint Indo-Irish efforts of S.L. Joshi and George Freeman.

The American branch of the association also invited Madame Cama—who at the time was close to the works of Krishna Varma—to give a series of lectures in the United States. An "India House" was founded in Manhattan in New York in January 1908 with funds from a wealthy lawyer of Irish descent called Myron Phelps. Phelps admired Swami Vivekananda, and the Vedanta Society (established by the Swami) in New York was at the time under Swami Abhedananda, who was considered "seditionist" by the British. In New York, Indian students and ex-residents of London India House took advantage of liberal press laws to circulate The Indian Sociologist and other nationalist literature. New York increasingly became an important centre for the global Indian movement, such that Free Hindustan, a political revolutionary journal published by Tarak Nath Das closely mirroring The Indian Sociologist, moved from Vancouver and Seattle to New York in 1908. Das collaborated extensively with the Gaelic American with help from George Freeman before Free Hindustan was proscribed in 1910 under British diplomatic pressure. After 1910, the American east coast activities began to decline and gradually shifted to San Francisco. The arrival of Har Dayal around this time bridged the gap between the intellectual agitators and the predominantly Punjabi labour workers and migrants, laying the foundations of the Ghadar movement.

== Ghadar party ==
The Pacific coast of North America saw large scale Indian immigration in the 1900s, especially from Punjab which was facing an economic depression. The Canadian government met this influx with a series of legislations aimed at limiting the entry of South Asians into Canada, and restricting the political rights of those already in the country. The Punjabi community had hitherto been an important loyal force for the British Empire and the Commonwealth, and the community had expected, to honour its commitment, equal welcome and rights from the British and Commonwealth governments as extended to British and white immigrants. These legislations fed growing discontent, protests and anti-colonial sentiments within the community. Faced with increasingly difficult situations, the community began organising itself into political groups. A large number of Punjabis also moved to the United States, but they encountered similar political and social problems.

Meanwhile, nationalist work among Indians on the east coast began to gain momentum from around 1908 when Indian students of the likes of P S Khankhoje, Kanshi Ram, and Tarak Nath Das founded the Indian Independence League in Portland, Oregon. Khankhoje's works also brought him close to Indian nationalists in the United States at the time, including Tarak Nath Das. In the years preceding World War I, Khankhoje was one of the founding members of the Pacific Coast Hindustan Association, and subsequently founded the Ghadar Party. He was at the time one of the most influential members of the party. He met Lala Har Dayal in 1911. He also enrolled at one point in a West Coast military academy.

The Ghadar Party, initially the Pacific Coast Hindustan Association, was formed in 1913 in the United States under the leadership of Baba Sohan Singh Bhakna as its president. It drew members from Indian immigrants, largely from Punjab. Many of its members were also from the University of California at Berkeley including Dayal, Tarak Nath Das, Kartar Singh Sarabha and V. G. Pingle. The party quickly gained support from Indian expatriates, especially in the United States, Canada, and Asia. Ghadar meetings were held in Los Angeles, Oxford, Vienna, Washington, D.C., and Shanghai.

Ghadar's ultimate goal was to overthrow British colonial authority in India by means of an armed revolution. It viewed the Congress-led mainstream movement for dominion status modest and the latter's constitutional methods as soft. Ghadar's foremost strategy was to entice Indian soldiers to revolt. To that end, in November 1913 Ghadar established the Yugantar Ashram press in San Francisco. The press produced the Hindustan Ghadar newspaper and other nationalist literature.

== Ghadar conspiracy ==
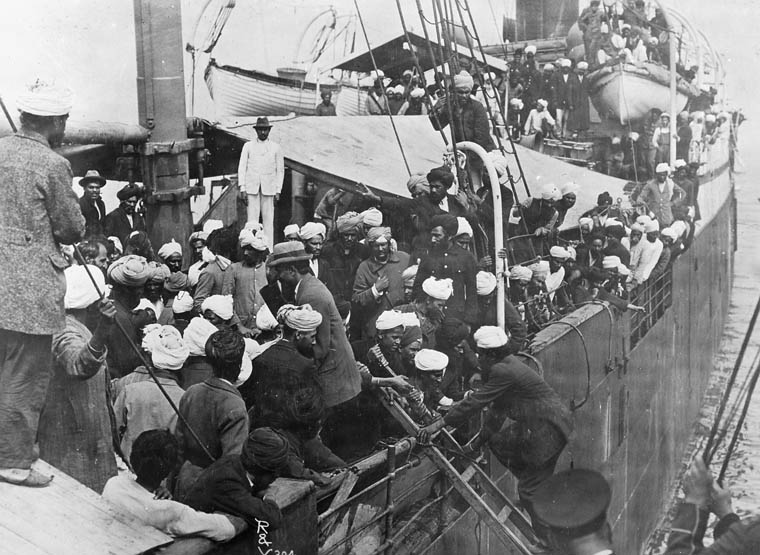
Punjabi Sikhs aboard the SS Komagata Maru in Vancouver's Burrard Inlet, 23 May 1914. Most of the passengers were not allowed to land in Canada and the ship was forced to return to India. The events surrounding the Komagata Maru incident served as a catalyst for the Ghadarite cause.

Har Dayal's contacts with erstwhile members of India House in Paris and in Berlin allowed early concepts of Indo-German collaboration to take shape. Towards the end of 1913, the party established contact with prominent revolutionaries in India, including Rash Behari Bose. An Indian edition of the Hindustan Ghadar essentially espoused the philosophies of anarchism and revolutionary terrorism against British interests in India. Political discontent and violence mounted in Punjab, and Ghadarite publications that reached Bombay from California were deemed seditious and banned by the Raj. These events, compounded by evidence of prior Ghadarite incitement in the Delhi-Lahore Conspiracy of 1912, led the British government to pressure the American State Department to suppress Indian revolutionary activities and Ghadarite literature, which emanated mostly from San Francisco.

=== 1912 ===
Rashbehari Bose and Sachin Sanyal staged a spectacular bomb attack on Viceroy Hardinge while he was making official entry into the new Capital of Delhi in a processing through Chandni Chowk in December 1912. Hardinge was injured, but not killed.

=== 1914 ===
During World War I, the British Indian Army contributed significantly to the British war effort. Consequently, a reduced force, estimated to have been as low as 15,000 troops in late 1914, was stationed in India. It was in this scenario that concrete plans for organising uprisings in India were made.

In September 1913, Mathra Singh, a Ghadarite, visited Shanghai and promoted the Ghadarite cause within the Indian community there. In January 1914, Singh visited India and circulated Ghadar literature amongst Indian soldiers through clandestine sources before leaving for Hong Kong. Singh reported that the situation in India was favourable for a revolution.

In May 1914, the Canadian government refused to allow the 400 Indian passengers of the ship Komagata Maru to disembark at Vancouver. The voyage had been planned as an attempt to circumvent Canadian exclusion laws that effectively prevented Indian immigration. Before the ship reached Vancouver, its approach was announced on German radio, and British Columbian authorities were prepared to prevent the passengers from entering Canada. The incident became a focal point for the Indian community in Canada which rallied in support of the passengers and against the government's policies. After a 2-month legal battle, 24 of them were allowed to immigrate. The ship was escorted out of Vancouver by the protected cruiser HMCS Rainbow and returned to India. On reaching Calcutta, the passengers were detained under the Defence of India Act at Budge Budge by the British Indian government, which made efforts to forcibly transport them to Punjab. This caused rioting at Budge Budge and resulted in fatalities on both sides. A number of Ghadar leaders, like Barkatullah and Tarak Nath Das, used the inflammatory passions surrounding the Komagata Maru incident as a rallying point and successfully brought many disaffected Indians in North America into the party's fold.

=== Outlines of mutiny ===
By October 1914, a large number of Ghadarites had returned to India and were assigned tasks like contacting Indian revolutionaries and organisations, spreading propaganda and literature, and arranging to get arms into the country that were being arranged to be shipped in from United States with German help. The first group of 60 Ghadarites led by Jawala Singh, left San Francisco for Canton aboard the steamship Korea on 29 August. They were to sail on to India, where they would be provided with arms to organise a revolt. At Canton, more Indians joined, and the group, now numbering about 150, sailed for Calcutta on a Japanese vessel. They were to be joined by more Indians arriving in smaller groups. During the September–October time period, about 300 Indians left for India in various ships like SS Siberia, Chinyo Maru, China, Manchuria, SS Tenyo Maru, SS Mongolia and SS Shinyo Maru. The SS Korea's party was uncovered and arrested on arrival at Calcutta. In spite of this, a successful underground network was established between the United States and India, through Shanghai, Swatow, and Siam. Tehl Singh, the Ghadar operative in Shanghai, is believed to have spent $30,000 for helping the revolutionaries to get into India.

Amongst those who returned were Vishnu Ganesh Pingle, Kartar Singh Sarabha, Santokh Singh, Pandit Kanshi Ram, Bhai Bhagwan Singh, who ranked amongst the higher leadership of the Ghadar Party. Pingle had known Satyen Bhushan Sen (Jatin Mukherjee's emissary) in the company of Gadhar members (such as Kartar Singh Sarabha) at the University of Berkeley. Tasked to consolidate contact with the Indian revolutionary movement, as part of the Ghadar Conspiracy, Satyen Bhushan Sen, Kartar Singh Sarabha, Vishnu Ganesh Pingle and a batch of Sikh militants sailed from America by the SS Salamin in the second half of October 1914. Satyen and Pingle halted in China for a few days to meet the Gadhar leaders (mainly Tahal Singh) for future plans. They met Dr Sun Yat-sen for co-operation. Dr. Sun was not prepared to displease the British. After Satyen and party left for India, Tahal sent Atmaram Kapur, Santosh Singh and Shiv Dayal Kapur to Bangkok for necessary arrangements. In November 1914, Pingle, Kartar Singh and Satyen Sen arrived in Calcutta. Satyen introduced Pingle and Kartar Singh to Jatin Mukherjee. "Pingle had long talks with Jatin Mukherjee, who sent them to Rash Behari" in Benares with necessary information during the third week of December. Satyen remained in Calcutta at 159 Bow Bazar [Street]. Tegart was informed of an attempt to tamper with some Sikh troops at the Dakshineswar gunpowder magazine. "A reference to the Military authorities shows that the troops in question were the 93rd Burmans" sent to Mesopotamia. Jatin Mukherjee and Satyen Bhushan Sen were seen interviewing these Sikhs. The Ghadarites rapidly established contact with the Indian revolutionary underground, notably that in Bengal, and the plans began to be consolidated by Rash Behari Bose and Jatin Mukherjee and the Ghadarites for a coordinated general uprising.

=== Early attempts ===
Indian revolutionaries under Lokamanya Tilak's inspiration, had turned Benares into a centre for sedition since the 1900s. Sundar Lal (b. 1885, son of Tota Ram, Muzaffarnagar) had given a very objectionable speech in 1907 on Shivaji Festival in Benares. Follower of Tilak, Lala Lajpat Rai and Sri Aurobindo, in 1908 this man had accompanied Lala in his UP lecture tour. His organ, the Swarajya of Allahabad, was warned in April 1908 against sedition. On 22 August 1909, Sundar Lal and Sri Aurobindo delivered "mischievous speeches" in College Square, Calcutta. The Karmayogi in Hindi was issued in Allahabad since September 1909: controlled by Sri Aurobindo, the Calcutta Karmagogin was edited by Amarendra Chatterjee who had introduced Rash Behari to Sundar Lal. In 1915, Pingle will be received in Allahabad by the Swarajya group. Rash Behari Bose had been in Benares since early 1914. Large number of outrages were committed there between October 1914 and September 1915, 45 of them before February was over. On 18 November 1914, while examining two bomb caps, he and Sachin Sanyal had been injured. They shifted to a house in Bangalitola, where Pingle visited him with a letter from Jatin Mukherjee and reported that some 4000 Sikhs of the Gadhar had already reached Calcutta. 15.000 more were waiting to join the rebellion. Rash Behari sent Pingle and Sachin to Amritsar, to discuss with Mula Singh who had arrived from Shanghai. Behari's man of confidence, Pingle, led a hectic life in UP and Punjab for several weeks.

During the Komagata Maru affray in Budge Budge, near Calcutta, on 29 September 1914, Baba Gurmukh Singh had contacted Atulkrishna Ghosh and Satish Chakravarti, two eminent associates of Jatin Mukherjee, who actively assisted them. Since then, angry letters from US-based Indians had reached India expressing hopes for a German victory; one of the emigrant leaders warned that his associates were in touch with the Bengal revolutionary party. It was at this juncture, in December 1914, that Pingle arrived in the Punjab, promising Bengali co-operation to the malcontent emigrants. A meeting demanded revolution, plundering of Government treasuries, seduction of Indian troops, collection of arms, preparation of bombs and the commission of dacoities. Rash Behari planned collecting gangs of villagers for the rebellion. Simultaneous outbreaks at Lahore, Ferozepore & Rawalpindi were organised while risings at Dacca, Benares, and Jubbalpur would be further extended.

Preparing bombs was a definite part of the Gadhar programme. The Sikh conspirators – knowing very little about it – decided to call in a Bengali expert, as they had known in California Professor Surendra Bose, associate of Taraknath Das. Towards the end of December 1914, at a meeting at Kapurthala, Pingle announced that a Bengali babu was ready to co-operate with them. On 3 January 1915, Pingle and Sachindra in Amritsar received Rs 500 from the Ghadar, and returned to Benares.

=== Coordination ===
Pingle returned to Calcutta with Rash Behari's invitation to the Jugantar leaders to meet him at Benares for co-ordinating and finalising their plans. Jatin Mukherjee, Atulkrishna Ghosh, Naren Bhattacharya left for Benares (early January 1915). In a very important meeting, Rash Behari announced the rebellion, proclaiming: "Die for their country." Though through Havildar Mansha Singh, the 16th Rajput Rifles at Fort William was successfully approached, Jatin Mukherjee wanted two months for the army revolt, synchronising with the arrival of the German arms. He modified the plan according to the impatience of the Gadhar militants to rush to action. Rash Behari and Pingle went to Lahore. Sachin tampered with the 7th Rajputs (Benares) and the 89th Punjabis at Dinapore. Damodar Sarup [Seth] went to Allahabad. Vinayak Rao Kapile conveyed bombs from Bengal to Punjab. Bibhuti [Haldar, approver] and Priyo Nath [Bhattacharya?] seduced the troops at Benares; Nalini [Mukherjee] at Jabalpur. On 14 February, Kapile carried from Benares to Lahore a parcel containing materials for 18 bombs.

By the middle of January, Pingle was back in Amritsar with "the fat babu" (Rash Behari); to avoid too many visitors, Rash Behari moved to Lahore after a fortnight. In both places, he collected materials for making bombs and ordered for 80 bomb cases to a foundry at Lahore. Its owner out of suspicion refused to execute the order. Instead, inkpots were used as cases in several of the dacoities. Completed bombs were found during house searches, while Rash Behari escaped. "By then effective contact had been established between the returned Gadharites and the revolutionaries led by Rash Behari, and a large section of soldiers in the NW were obviously disaffected." "It was expected that as soon as the signal was received there would be mutinies and popular risings from Punjab to Bengal." "48 out of the 81 accused in the Lahore conspiracy case, including Rash Behari's close associates like Pingle, Mathura Singh & Kartar Singh Sarabha, recently arrived from North America."

Along with Rash Behari Bose, Sachin Sanyal and Kartar Singh Sarabha, Pingle became one of the main coordinators of the attempted mutiny in February 1915. Under Rash Behari, Pingle issued intensive propaganda for revolution from December 1914, sometimes disguised as Shyamlal, a Bengali; sometimes Ganpat Singh, a Punjabi.

=== Setting a date ===
Confident of being able to rally the Indian sepoy, the plot for the mutiny took its final shape. The 23rd Cavalry in Punjab was to seize weapons and kill their officers while on roll call on 21 February. This was to be followed by mutiny in the 26th Punjab, which was to be the signal for the uprising to begin, resulting in an advance on Delhi and Lahore. The Bengal revolutionaries contacted the Sikh troops stationed at Dhaka through letters of introduction sent by Sikh soldiers of Lahore, and succeeded in winning them over. The Bengal cell was to look for the Punjab Mail entering the Howrah Station the next day (which would have been cancelled if Punjab was seized) and was to strike immediately.

=== 1915 Indian mutiny ===
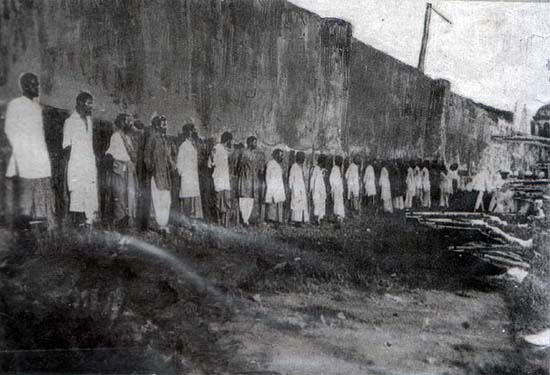
The public executions of convicted sepoy mutineers at Outram Road, Singapore, c. March 1915

By the start of 1915, a large number of Ghadarites (nearly 8,000 in the Punjab province alone by some estimates) had returned to India. However, they were not assigned a central leadership and begun their work on an ad hoc basis. Although some were rounded up by the police on suspicion, many remained at large and began establishing contacts with garrisons in major cities like Lahore, Ferozepur and Rawalpindi. Various plans had been made to attack the military arsenal at Mian Meer, near Lahore and initiate a general uprising on 15 November 1914. In another plan, a group of Sikh soldiers, the manjha jatha, planned to start a mutiny in the 23rd Cavalry at the Lahore cantonment on 26 November. A further plan called for a mutiny to start on 30 November from Ferozepur under Nidham Singh. In Bengal, the Jugantar, through Jatin Mukherjee, established contacts with the garrison at Fort William in Calcutta. In August 1914, Mukherjee's group had seized a large consignment of guns and ammunition from the Rodda company, a major gun manufacturing firm in India. In December, a number of politically motivated armed robberies to obtain funds were carried out in Calcutta. Mukherjee kept in touch with Rash Behari Bose through Kartar Singh and V.G. Pingle. These rebellious acts, which were until then organised separately by different groups, were brought into a common umbrella under the leadership of Rash Behari Bose in North India, V. G. Pingle in Maharashtra, and Sachindranath Sanyal in Benares. A plan was made for a unified general uprising, with the date set for 21 February 1915.

=== February 1915 ===
In India, confident of being able to rally the Indian sepoy, the plot for the mutiny took its final shape. Under the plans, the 23rd Cavalry in Punjab was to seize weapons and kill their officers while on roll call on 21 February. This was to be followed by mutiny in the 26th Punjab, which was to be the signal for the uprising to begin, resulting in an advance on Delhi and Lahore. The Bengal cell was to look for the Punjab Mail entering the Howrah Station the next day (which would have been cancelled if Punjab was seized) and was to strike immediately.

However, the Punjab CID successfully infiltrated the conspiracy at the last moment through Kirpal Singh: a cousin of the trooper Balwant Singh (23rd Cavalry), US-returned Kirpal, a spy, visited Rash Behari's Lahore headquarters near the Mochi Gate, where over a dozen leaders including Pingle met on 15 February 1915. Kirpal informed the police. Sensing that their plans had been compromised, the D-day was brought forward to 19 February, but even these plans found their way to the Punjab CID. Plans for revolt by the 130th Baluchi Regiment at Rangoon on 21 February were thwarted. On 15 February, the 5th Light Infantry stationed at Singapore was among the few units to actually rebel. About half of the eight hundred and fifty troops comprising the regiment mutinied on the afternoon of the 15th, along with nearly a hundred men of the Malay States Guides. This mutiny lasted almost seven days, and resulted in the deaths of forty-seven British soldiers and local civilians. The mutineers also released the interned crew of the SMS Emden. The mutiny was only put down after French, Russian and Japanese ships arrived with reinforcements. Of nearly two hundred tried at Singapore, forty-seven were shot in a public execution,. Most of the rest were deported for life or given jail terms ranging between seven and twenty years. Some historians, including Hew Strachan, argue that although Ghadar agents operated within the Singapore unit, the mutiny was isolated and not linked to the conspiracy. Others deem this as instigated by the Silk Letter Movement which became intricately related to the Ghadarite conspiracy. Plans for revolt in the 26th Punjab, 7th Rajput, 24th Jat Artillery and other regiments did not go beyond the conspiracy stage. Planned mutinies in Firozpur, Lahore, and Agra were also suppressed and many key leaders of the conspiracy were arrested, although some managed to escape or evade arrest. A last-ditch attempt was made by Kartar Singh and Pingle to trigger a mutiny in the 12th Cavalry regiment at Meerut. Kartar Singh Sarabha escaped from Lahore, but was arrested in Benares, and V. G. Pingle was apprehended from the lines of the 12th Cavalry at Meerut, in the night of 23 March 1915. He carried "ten bombs of the pattern used in the attempt to assassinate Lord Hardinge in Delhi," according to Bombay police report. It is said that it was enough to blow up an entire regiment. Mass arrests followed as the Ghadarites were rounded up in Punjab and the Central Provinces. Rash Behari Bose escaped from Lahore and in May 1915 fled to Japan. Other leaders, including Giani Pritam Singh, Swami Satyananda Puri and others fled to Thailand or other sympathetic nations.

== Later efforts ==
Other related events include the 1915 Singapore Mutiny, the Annie Larsen arms plot, Christmas Day Plot, events leading up to the death of Bagha Jatin, as well as the German mission to Kabul, the mutiny of the Connaught Rangers in India, as well as, by some accounts, the Black Tom explosion in 1916. The Indo-Irish-German alliance and the conspiracy were the target of a worldwide British intelligence effort, which was successful in preventing further attempts. American intelligence agencies arrested key figures in the aftermath of the Annie Larsen affair in 1917. The conspiracy led to criminal conspiracy trials like the Lahore Conspiracy Case trial in India and the Hindu–German Conspiracy Trial in the United States, the latter being the longest and most expensive trial in the country at that date.

== Trials ==
The conspiracy led to a number of trials in India, most famous among them being the Lahore Conspiracy Case trial, which opened in Lahore in April 1915 in the aftermath of the failed February mutiny. Other trials included the Benares, Simla, Delhi, and Ferozepur conspiracy cases, and the trials of those arrested at Budge Budge. At Lahore, a special tribunal was constituted under the Defence of India Act 1915 and a total of 291 conspirators were put on trial. Of these 42 were awarded the death sentence, 114 transported for life, and 93 awarded varying terms of imprisonment. A number of these were sent to the Cellular Jail in the Andaman. Forty-two defendants in the trial were acquitted. The Lahore trial directly linked the plans made in United States and the February mutiny plot. Following the conclusion of the trial, diplomatic effort to destroy the Indian revolutionary movement in the United States and to bring its members to trial increased considerably.

== Influence ==
The Hindu–German Conspiracy as a whole, as well as the intrigues of the Ghadar Party in Punjab during the war, were among the main stimuli for the enactment of the Defence of India Act, appointment of the Rowlatt Committee, and the enactment of the Rowlatt Acts. The Jallianwala Bagh massacre is also linked intimately with the Raj's fears of a Ghadarite uprising in India especially Punjab in 1919.

== See also ==
- British counter-intelligence against the Indian revolutionary movement during World War I
- Ghadar Party
- Lala Ram Saran Das Talwar
