= Ganda Singh =

Indian activist

Ganda Singh, whose home town was Ferozepur in India, was a prominent member of the Ghadar Party. He spent some time in Hankou, China, where he met Chiang Kai-shek. in 1926, and M. N. Roy, in 1927. On the occasion of the visit of the former, he was reported to have made an anti-British speech, whilst he participated in the reception for Roy's visit to the Sikh gurdwara that formed a hub for Ghadarite activity. Singh was then on the staff of the Hindustan Ghadar Dhandora. He moved to Nanking in October 1927, where he worked as editor of the Hindustan Ghadar Dhandora and also managed a branch of the Eastern Oppressed Peoples Association. He was joined in his 1927 move to Nanking by Arjun Singh and Udham Singh, and by others in 1929. Thereafter, he was among a group of Ghadar Party leaders who were deported from the country.
