= George Freeman (newspaper editor) =

Irish-American newspaper editor

George Freeman, born George Fitzgerald, an Irish-American, was editor of the Gaelic American newspaper. He also worked for the Free Hindustan newspaper and was involved in attempts to incite a revolt in British-ruled India.
