= Defence of India Act, 1915 =

Emergency criminal law in British India

Defence of India (Criminal Law Amendment) Act, 1915

The Governor-General in Council
- Long title: An Act to provide for special measures to secure the public safety and the defence of British India and for the more speedy trial of certain offences.
- Citation: Act No. IV of 1915
- Territorial extent: Whole of British India
- Enacted by: The Governor-General in Council
- Signed: 19 March 1915
- Commenced: 19 March 1915

Repealed by
- Act 4 of 1922
- Status: Repealed

The Defence of India Act, 1915 (Act IV of 1915), also referred to as the Defence of India Regulations Act, 1915 or the Defence of India (Criminal Law Amendment) Act, 1915, was an emergency criminal law enacted by the Governor-General of India in 1915 with the intention of curtailing the nationalist and revolutionary activities during and in the aftermath of the First World War. It was similar to the British Defence of the Realm Acts, and granted the Executive very wide powers of preventive detention, internment without trial, restriction of writing, speech, and of movement. However, unlike the English law which was limited to persons of hostile associations or origin, the Defence of India Act could be applied to any subject of the king, and was used to an overwhelming extent against Indians. The passage of the act was supported unanimously by the non-official Indian members in the Viceroy's legislative council, and was seen as necessary to protect against British India from subversive nationalist violence. The act was first applied during the First Lahore Conspiracy trial in the aftermath of the failed Ghadar Conspiracy of 1915, and was instrumental in crushing the Ghadr movement in Punjab and the Anushilan Samiti in Bengal. However its widespread and indiscriminate use in stifling genuine political discourse made it deeply unpopular, and became increasingly reviled within India. The extension of the law in the form of the Rowlatt Act after the end of World War I was opposed unanimously by the non-official Indian members of the Viceroy's council. It became a flashpoint of political discontent and nationalist agitation, culminating in the Rowlatt Satyagraha. The act was re-enacted during World War II as Defence of India act 1939. Independent India retained the law in a number of amended forms, which have seen use in proclaimed states of national emergency including Sino-Indian War, Bangladesh crisis, The Emergency of 1975 and subsequently the Punjab insurgency.

== Background ==
Punjab and Bengal, along with Maharashtra, became hotbeds of revolutionary nationalist violence against British rule in India in the first decade of the 20th century. The 1905 partition of Bengal and the 1906 Punjab Land Colonization Act fed growing discontent.

In Bengal, revolutionary organisations like Anushilan Samiti and Jugantar drew young recruits from the educated middle-class Bhadralok ranks, and engaged in a number of prominent attacks on both figures in the administration as well as the local police investigating incidents of robbery, violence and murder linked to these groups. These included assassinations and attempted assassinations of civil servants, prominent public figures and Indian informants. In 1907 attempts were made on the life of the Bengal Lieutenant-Governor Sir Andrew Fraser. In 1908, a failed assassination attempt by Jugantar on the life of Presidency Magistrate Douglas Kingsford led to death of two European women. In 1909, a failed assassination attempt saw two bombs thrown at the Viceroy of India Lord Minto. In December that year the magistrate of Nasik A. M. T. Jackson was shot dead by Anant Kanhere, and suspicion fell on links to India House in London which was at the time being led by V. D. Savarkar, whose elder brother Ganesh had been convicted by Jackson of seditious conspiracy. India House was also held responsible for the murder in London of William Hutt Curzon Wyllie, the political ADC to the Secretary of State for India. A number of assassinations were also carried out of approvers who had turned crown-witnesses. In 1909 Naren Gossain, crown-witness for the prosecution in Alipore bomb case, was shot dead within Alipore Jail. Ashutosh Biswas, an advocate of Calcutta High Court in charge of prosecution of Gossain murder case, was shot dead within the court in 1909. In 1910, Shamsul Alam, Deputy Superintendent of Bengal Police responsible for investigating the Alipore Bomb case, was shot dead on the steps of Calcutta High Court.

In Punjab, agitation against the 1906 colonisation bill, which the protagonists falsely believed was attempting to introduce law of primogeniture, led to widespread unrest. Punjab police had become aware of nuclei of nationalist movements arising across the state in the form of a nascent Ghadr movement, fed by resources and the efforts of emigrant Sikh communities living in Canada. Investigations during 1912 into an attempt to assassinate the then viceroy, Charles Hardinge, promulgated the discovery of links between Bengal revolutionaries commanded by erstwhile Jugantar member Rash Behari Bose, and the Ghadr movement in Punjab.

== Early laws ==
=== Preventive detention ===
The Bengal Regulation of 1812 and Regulation III of 1818 were some of the earliest laws in British India to incorporate the provisions of Preventive detention, without having to commit the detainee to trial. In the Presidencies of Madras and Bombay, similar laws had been enacted in 1819 and 1827 respectively. Prisoners under these regulations had no right of habeas corpus. Section 491 of the Criminal Procedure Code introduced the writ of Habeas Corpus in 1882. In 1907, emergency ordinances were issued in Punjab and in Eastern Bengal and Assam on the fiftieth anniversary of the 1857 mutiny. This allowed abolishment of public meetings, and the Indian press was subjected to controls to limit seditious material being published. The Explosive Substances Act and the Newspaper Act were passed in June 1908 to try and arrest agitation.

In June 1907 local governments were further authorised to initiate proceedings against local press publishing seditious material amongst civilian population or the army. The Indian Sociologist was banned in India in September 1907 and in November that year the Prevention of Seditious Meetings Act was passed. February 1910 saw the introduction of Indian Press Act which allowed Provincial governments to ask for punitive securities of up to Rs 5,000 from newspapers likely to incite sedition and violence. This act resulted in a number of nationalist publications closing down unable to provide such a surety.

=== Criminal law amendment 1908 ===
Failure of prosecution in a number of cases under the Criminal procedures act 1898 led to a special act whereby crimes of nationalist violence were to be tried by a special tribunal composed of three high-court judges. December 1908 saw the passage of the Criminal Law amendments under the terms of Regulation III of 1818 and to suppress associations formed for seditious conspiracies. The act was first applied to deport nine Bengali revolutionaries to Mandalay prison in 1908. Despite these measures however, high standards of evidence demanded by the Calcutta High Court, insufficient investigations by police, and at times outright fabrication of evidence led to persistent failure to tame nationalist violence. Police forces felt unable to deal with the operations of secretive nationalist organisations, leading to demands for special powers. These were opposed vehemently in the Indian press, which argued against any extension of already wide powers enjoyed by the police forces in India, and which it was argued was being used to oppress Indian people.

== World War I ==
The First World War began with an unprecedented outpouring of support towards Britain from within the mainstream political leadership, contrary to initial British fears of an Indian revolt. India contributed massively to the British war effort by providing men and resources. About 1.3 million Indian soldiers and labourers served in Europe, Africa and the Middle East, while both the Indian government and the princes sent large supplies of food, money and ammunition. However, Bengal and Punjab remained hotbeds of anti colonial activities. After the onset of the First World War, plague, rising grain prices, dissatisfaction with immigration policies within the British empire (highlighted by the Komagata Maru affair), and rumours of British misfortunes in the war meant by 1914, Punjab was in an unsettled state. India lay considerably far away from the Central Powers, with only feasible routes of invasion being through Persia and Afghanistan. The Indian Government at the outset of the war anticipated that India would remain safe as long as Afghanistan maintained neutrality, and the tribes of NWFP were under control. The worst situation would be from a combination of war with Afghanistan and internal unrest fomented by either the Bengali revolutionary network, the Ghadr in Punjab or Indian Muslims who may sympathise with Ottoman Umma.

=== Ghadr ===
British intelligence in North America indicated early in the war that the Ghadr Party, co-ordinating with the Berlin Committee in Germany, and the Indian revolutionary underground was attempting to transport men and arms from United States and East Asia into India, intended for a revolution and mutiny in the British Indian Army. From August 1914, a large number of Sikh expatriates began leaving Canada and USA under the plans of the Ghadr leadership for fomenting mutiny in India, whilst in Bengal nationalist crime also increased. Department of Criminal Intelligence chief Charles Cleveland noted that the threat to India should be dealt with by dealing with Ghadr activists who were already in India and those who were returning. To this end, Ingress into India Ordinance, 1914 was passed to limit the influx of Ghadarites, but failed to stem the inflow. The planned mutiny for February 1915 was averted at the last minute.

=== Bengal ===
In the meantime, the situation in Bengal worsened considerably following the Rodda Company raid by Jugantar, which handed large amount of firearms to Bengal revolutionaries. There were 36 outrages in 1915, climbing steeply from 13 in 1913 and 14 in 1914. The revolutionaries launched what has been described by some historians as "a reign of terror in both the cities and the countryside" that "came close to achieving their key goal of paralysing the administration." A general atmosphere of fear encompassed the police and the law courts, severely affecting the moral. In entire 1915, only six revolutionaries were successfully brought to trial.

== Defence of India act ==
On 19 March 1915, Sir Reginald Craddock, home member in the Viceroy's council introduced the law and it passed in a single sitting. It was enacted as a temporary legislation in effect for the duration of World War I and for six months afterwards. The act gave the Governor General in Council the power to make rules

for the purpose of securing the public safety and the defence of British India and as to the powers and duties of public servants and other persons in furtherance of that purpose...

Considerable pressure for the passage of the act was from Michael O'Dwyer particularly in light of the Ghadr threat. Answering to Sir Surendranath Bannerjee in the legislative assembly, Craddock denied any necessity or propriety for the government to constitute an advisory board of judicial character that would deal with the applications of the act. In this regard the law differed from the Defence of the Realm act. Craddock explained to the assembly that the lack of judicial oversight and advice were acceptable since the restrictive measures in the act were "preventive and not punitive in measures".

=== Scope ===
The law was to be valid for the duration of the war and for six months thereafter "for public safety" and "the defence of British India". The main object of the law made it illegal to communicate with the enemy, obtaining information, spreading false reports, as well as any activities that the government saw prejudicial to the war effort. The act allowed local governments to make rules detain indefinitely, without representation, and to try by special tribunals persons "reasonably suspected" of being of hostile origin or acting in a manner prejudicial to the safety of the empire. committing or conspiring to commit crimes either described in the act, or crimes which maybe punishable by death, transportation or at least seven year imprisonment. Power of detention, unlike under DORA, was carried by subordinate officers. For Trials already initiated under the Criminal procedures act 1898 or the 1908 Criminal law amendment were exempt from the act. Prosecution was to follow the procedures prescribed in the criminal procedures act 1898, but was superseded by the special powers and discretion of court. Crucially however, the Commissioners could take direct cognisance of the offences alleged and therefore preliminary procedures could be disposed off with.

=== Implementation ===
The act gave powers to local government to appoint three commissioners for trials who may be below the status of high-court judges. At least two would be Sessions judges or additional sessions judges for at least three years, were qualified for appointment as Judges of a High Court, or advocates of a Chief Court or pleaders of ten years' standing. A majority verdict was acceptable.

The act allowed the commissioners to accept as evidence statements recorded by a magistrates without scrutiny to cross examination and superseded the standards of evidence proscribed in the Indian evidence act 1872. Further the act allowed commissioners to accept such recorded evidence where the witness was unavailable or dead. This measure was intended to secure and safeguard against intimidation and assassinations by revolutionaries of approvers. There was no right to trial by jury. The act excluded from appeal or judicial review the decisions of the commissioners appointed under the Defence of India act.

Although designed to maintain order and curtail revolutionary movement, the law was in practice used in widespread scale from limiting revolutionaries, through arresting perpetrators of religious violence, to curtailing the voice of moderate political leaders. Unlike the Defence of the Realm Act (which was limited in scope to people of Hostile origin or associations, i.e. enemy citizens or collaborators), the act could be applied against any subject of the King. By June 1917, 705 were under home-arrest under the act, along with 99 imprisonments under Regulation III. Through the war, more than 1400 people were interned in India under the Defence of India Act alone, and a further three hundred subjected to minor restrictions, while more than two thousand were subjected to the restrictions of the Ingress into India Ordinance.

== Impact ==
At the time of its enactment, the Defence of India act received universal support from Indian non-officiating members in the Governor General's council, from moderate leaders within Indian Political Movement. The British war effort had received popular support within India and the act received support on the understanding that the measures enacted were necessary in the war-situation. Its application saw a significant curtailment in revolutionary violence in India. However, the wide scope and widespread use amongst general population and against even moderate leaders led to growing revulsion within Indian population.

=== Revolutionary violence ===
The enactment of the law saw 46 executions and 64 life sentences handed out to revolutionaries in Bengal and Punjab in the Lahore Conspiracy Trial and Benares Conspiracy Trial, and in tribunals in Bengal, effectively crushing the revolutionary movement. The power of preventive detention were however applied more particularly to Bengal. By March 1916 widespread arrests helped Bengal Police crush the Dhaka Anushilan Samiti in Calcutta. Regulation III and Defence of India act was applied to Bengal from August 1916 on a wide scale. In Bengal, revolutionary violence in Bengal plummeted to 10 in 1917. By the end of the war there were more than eight hundred interned in Bengal under the act.

=== Moderate dissent ===
The application of the act was not limited to those suspected of revolutionary crimes. It gradually came to be used in coercing and suppressing the voice of many nationalist leaders, even of moderate views, where regional administration felt their opinion or views were seditious to British rule in India, or dangerous to the administration. A number of prominent moderate leaders were interned or deported under the Defence of India act. Most notable of these leaders was Mrs Annie Besant. Beasant had set up branches of the Home Rule League in major towns and cities at the time Bal Gangadhar Tilak was establishing the league in Bombay and in Western India. Although these amounted to little more than debating societies (having been modelled on the Fabian Societies), the leagues were noted to be publishing political pamphlets, selling almost 46000 of these in 1916. Libraries were also established where political treatises were made available. Beasant's league had 27000 members by 1917, and that same year both Tilak and Beasant were interned under the act on the grounds their activities were becoming subversive. India. Maulana Muhammad Ali Jauhar and Maulana Shaukat Ali were arrested and interned after they were found to have been in liaison with individuals in Kabul linked to the German mission, which the administration suspected may have been to promulgate a pan-Indian Islamic revolution. Abul Kalam Azad was deported from Bengal and placed under house arrest in Ranchi for his writing in Al Balagh.

=== Post-WWI ===
The Defence of India Act, in its implementation, was increasingly reviled. The unpopularity was such that the Lucknow session of the Indian National Congress in 1917 passed a resolution expressing alarm at the extensive use of the act, and urged the Government that its use be under same principles as the Defence of the Realm Act. Immediately after the war, Benjamin Horniman was deported from the Presidency of Bombay for his reporting on the Amritsar massacre.

== Later laws ==
=== Rowlatt act ===
With the impending lapse of the 1915 act, the Rowlatt Committee was appointed to recommend measures to deal with the threat from the revolutionary movement. Rowlatt recommended an extension of the provisions of the Defence of India act for a further three years with removal of habeas corpus provisions. It was met with universal opposition by the Indian members of the Viceroy's council, as well within the population in general, earning the title of "The Black Bills" from Mohandas Gandhi. Mohammed Ali Jinnah left the Viceroy's council in protest, after having warned the council of the dangerous consequences of enacting an extension of such an unpopular bill. Rowlatt's recommendations were enacted in the Rowlatt Bills. The agitations against the proposed Rowlatt bills took shape as the Rowlatt Satyagraha under the leadership of Gandhi, one of the first Civil disobedience movements that he would lead the Indian independence movement. The protests saw hartals in Delhi, public protests in Punjab as well as other protest movements across India. In Punjab, protests against the bills, along with a perceived threat of a Ghadrite uprising by the Punjab regional government culminated in the Jallianwalla Bagh Massacre in April 1919. After nearly three years of agitation, the government finally repealed the Rowlatt act and its component sister acts.

=== 1939 act ===
The Defence of India act 1915 was re-enacted in a more severe form at the onset of World War II as the Defence of India act 1939. Although enacted on 29 September 1939 it was deemed to come into force from 3 September 1939, the day when the Second World War began. The act was used notoriously during the war in subduing the independence movement. It expired six months after the termination of the war and was ultimately repealed by the Repealing and Amending Act, 1947 (Act II of 1948).

=== Independent India ===
The Indian Constitution retained the principles of preventive detention encapsulated in the Defence of India act, making one of the few countries where citizens of the country may be subjected to such measures. In Independent India, the law retained in legislations in the form of Preventive Detention act 1950, and has seen implementation as the Defence of India Rules 1962 during the Sino-Indian War of 1962, and the Defence of India Act, 1971 during the 1971 Indo-Pak war. The 1962 act gained notoriety for its use in internment of Chinese immigrants in India, most notably Calcutta. Other similar laws enacted in independent India include the Maintenance of Internal Security Act (MISA) during The Emergency, and Terrorist and Disruptive Activities (Prevention) Act (enacted during the Punjab insurgency) which carry very similar provisions.
