= Kartar Singh Sarabha =

Indian revolutionary (1896–1915)

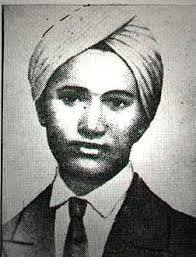
- Born: 24 May 1896; Sarabha, Punjab Province, British India (present-day Punjab, India)
- Died: 16 November 1915 (aged 19); Central Jail, Lahore, Punjab Province, British India (present-day Punjab, Pakistan)
- Cause of death: Execution by hanging
- Other name: Kartar Singh
- Occupation: Revolutionary
- Employer: Ghadar Party
- Known for: Being one of the most active member of Ghadar Party
- Movement: Indian independence movement

Kartar Singh Sarabha (24 May 1896 — 16 November 1915) was an Indian revolutionary. At the age of 15, he became a member of the Ghadar Party; later taking a leadership role and fighting for the Indian independence movement as an extremely active member of the movement. In November 1915 at Central Jail, Lahore, he was executed for his role in the movement at the age of 19.

== Early life ==
Kartar Singh was born to Mangal Singh Grewal and Sahib Kaur, a Jat Sikh family in Sarabha, a village near Ludhiana in Punjab. He was very young when his father died, and consequently, his grandfather brought him up. After receiving his initial education in his village, Singh entered the Malwa Khalsa high school in Ludhiana; he studied there until 8th standard.

In July 1912, he sailed to San Francisco to enroll at the University of California at Berkeley, but the evidence that he did study is unclear. The university does not have any record of Kartar Singh's enrollment. His association with the Nalanda club of Indian students at Berkeley aroused his patriotic sentiments, and he felt agitated about the treatment that immigrants from India, especially manual workers, received in the United States. A note by Baba Jwala Singh mentions that when he went to Astoria, Oregon in December 1912, he found Kartar Singh working in a lumber mill .

Sohan Singh Bhakna, the founder of the Ghadar Party, inspired Singh to campaign against British colonial rule for the sake of an independent country. Sohan Singh Bhakna called Kartar Singh "Baba Gernal". He learnt from Americans how to shoot a gun, and how to make detonators. Kartar Singh also took lessons for flying aeroplanes. He frequently spoke with other Indians, many of whom supported colonial rule, on the need for India to become independent from British rule.

== Ghadar Party and newspaper ==
When the Ghadar party was founded in mid-1913 with Sohan Singh, a Sikh from Bhakna village in the Amritsar district, as president and Lala Hardyal as secretary, Kartar Singh stopped his university work, moved in with Lala Hardyal and became his helpmate in running the revolutionary newspaper Ghadar (revolt). He undertook the responsibility for printing of the Gurmukhi edition of the paper. He composed patriotic poetry for it and wrote articles.

On 15 July 1913, the Punjabi Indians of California assembled and formed the Ghadar Party (Revolution Party). The aim of the Ghadar Party was to get rid of British rule in India by means of an armed struggle. On 1 November 1913, the Ghadar Party started printing a paper named Ghadar, which was published in Punjabi, Hindi, Urdu, Bengali, Gujarati and Pushto. Kartar Singh was quite heavily involved in the publishing of that paper.

This paper was sent to Indians living in all countries throughout the world. Its purpose was to convince both Indians and the Indian diaspora to support the freedom movement.

Within a short time, the Ghadar Party became famous through Ghadar. It drew Indians from all walks of life.

== Revolt in Punjab ==
With the start of World War I in 1914, British India became thoroughly engrossed in the Allied war effort. Thinking it to be a good opportunity, the leaders of the Ghadar Party published the "Decision of Declaration of War" against the British in an issue of Ghadar dated 5 August 1914. Thousands of copies of the paper were distributed among army cantonments, villages and cities. Kartar Singh reached Calcutta via Colombo on board SS Salamin in October 1914. He accompanied two other Ghadar leaders, Satyen Sen and Vishnu Ganesh Pingle, along with a large number of Gadhar freedom fighters. With a letter of introduction from Jatin Mukherjee, the Jugantar leader, Singh and Pingle met Rash Behari Bose at Banaras to inform him that 20,000 more Ghadar members were expected very soon. A large number of leaders of the Ghadar Party were arrested by the government at the ports. In spite of these arrests, a meeting was held by members of the Ghadar Party at Ladhouwal near Ludhiana in which it was decided to commit robberies in the houses of the rich to meet the financial requirements for armed action. Two Ghadris, Waryam Singh and Bhai Ram Rakha, were killed in a bomb blast in one such raid.

After the arrival of Rash Behari Bose at Amritsar on 25 January 1915, it was decided in a meeting on 12 February that the uprising should be started on 21 February. It was planned that after capturing the cantonments of Mian Mir and Ferozepur, mutiny was to be engineered near Ambala and Delhi.

== Betrayal ==
Kirpal Singh, a police informer in the ranks of the Ghadar Party, had a large number of members arrested on 19 February and informed the government of the planned revolt. The government disarmed the native soldiers and the revolt failed.

After the failure of the revolution, the members who had escaped arrest decided to leave India. Kartar, Harnam Singh Tundilat, Jagat Singh, and others were asked to go to Afghanistan, while Ishar Singh was directed to China and made a move toward that area. On 2 March 1915, he came back with two friends and went over to Chak No. 5 in Sargodha where there was a military stud and started propagating rebellion amongst the army men. Risaldar Ganda Singh had Kartar, Harnam Singh Tundilat, and Jagat Singh arrested from Chak No. 5, Lyallpur district.

== Execution ==
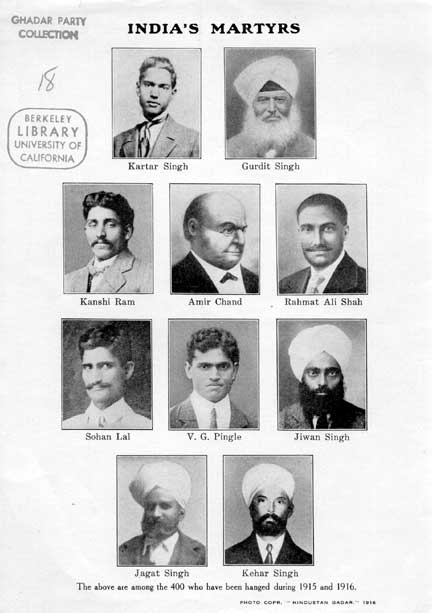
Ghadar Party Handbill listing executed revolutionaries between 1915 and 1916

All of these accused in the Conspiracy Case were executed in the Lahore Central Jail on 17 November 1915. In the Court room, and also when standing before the gallows, the condemned men refused to accept their endeavour to be termed a 'conspiracy'. They contended that it was an open challenge to the foreigners who charged the patriots with the offence of sedition, of waging war against the King. Kartar was not at all sorry for what he had done; rather he felt proud for enjoying the privilege of throwing out the challenge to the usurpers. He was really sorry over the outcome of their efforts. He averred that every 'slave' had a right to revolt and it could never be a crime to rise in defence of the primary rights of the sons of the very soil. When he was being tried on the charge of sedition, he took the entire blame upon himself. The Judge was astounded to see such a young boy behaving in such a nonchalant manner. In view of his age, he advised the young revolutionary to modify his statement, but the result was the opposite. When asked to appeal he retorted,

"Why should I? If I had more lives than one, it would have been a great honour to me to sacrifice each of them for my country."

He was later sentenced to death and hanged in 1915. During the period of his detention in Lahore Central Jail, Kartar managed to get hold of some instruments with which he wanted to cut the iron-bars of his window and escape in company with some other revolutionaries. However, the jail authorities who had learnt about his designs seized the instruments from underneath an earthen pitcher in his room. At the time of his execution Kartar was hardly nineteen years old. But such was his courage that in the course of his detention he gained 14 pounds in weight.

== Legacy ==
Bhagat Singh was inspired by him. "On Bhagat Singh's arrest, a photo of Sarabha was recovered from him. He always carried this photo in his pocket. Very often, Bhagat Singh would show me that photograph and say, 'Dear mother, this is my hero, friend and companion.' " - Bhagat Singh's mother.

Shaheed Kartar Singh Sarabha, an Indian Punjabi-language biographical film on the revolutionary, was released in 1977.

== See also ==
- Udham Singh
- Sukhdev
- Harnam Singh Saini
- Bhagat Singh
- Lala Lajpat Rai
