= Lahore Conspiracy Case trial =

Trials held in British India

1915 Lahore Conspiracy Case trial or First Lahore Conspiracy Case, was a series of trials held in Lahore (then part of the undivided Punjab of British India), and in the United States, in the aftermath of the failed Ghadar conspiracy from 26 April to 13 September 1915. There were nine cases in total. The trial was held by a Special tribunal constituted under the Defence of India Act 1915.

Out of a total of 291 convicted conspirators, 42 were executed, 114 got life sentences and 93 got varying terms of imprisonment. 42 defendants in the trial were acquitted. 152 persons were made accused. The uncovering of the conspiracy also saw the initiation of the Hindu German Conspiracy trial in the United States.

== See also ==
- 1929 CLA Bombing Case, bombing of national assembly by Bhagat Singh and associates
- 1929-30 Lahore Conspiracy Case, death sentence to Bhagat Singh and associates for the murder of John Saunders
- Ghadar conspiracy
- Hindu German Conspiracy trial
