= A. R. Pillai =

Indian pro-independence writer in Germany

A. Raman Pillai
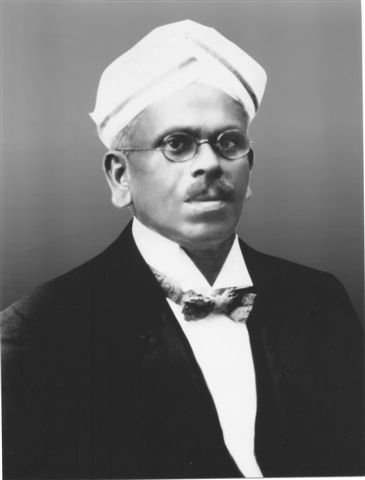
- Born: 26 December 1879
- Died: 7 September 1938 (aged 58)
- Education: University of Edinburgh; University of Göttingen
- Occupations: Journalist, writer and book publisher

Ayyappan Pillai Raman Pillai (26 December 1879 – 7 September 1938), also known as A. Raman Pillai or A. R. Pillai, was an Indian expatriate journalist, writer and book publisher in Göttingen, Germany, who worked for India's freedom.

== Early life ==
Pillai was born on 26 December 1879 as the only son of Padmanabha Pillai, a government school inspector, who came from the then South Travancore. A. R. Pillai's mother, Narayani Pillai Kaaliyamma Pillai, niece (maternal cousin's daughter) of Easwara Pillai Vicharippukar, was a member of an aristocratic and affluent Hindu (Nair) matriarchal/matrilineal joint family. The family lived in a large complex of buildings known as Punnackal, situated on the western side of Sri Padmanabhaswamy temple inside the Fort, Thiruvananthapuram. The house had been built for Easwara Pillai Vicharippukar, the celebrated doyen of Kathakali actors of Valia Kottaaram Kathakali Yogam of 19th-century Travancore State and Palace manager (Palliyara Vicharippukar) in the Travancore Palace, by his patron and king, Uthram Thirunaal Marthanda Varma.

Punnackal at the time of A. R. Pillai's birth was still a joint family (Tharavaad) with the eldest male member on the matrilineal side heading the family, taking care of its members and looking after its properties. The joint family had two other branches (sub-Tharavaads), one in Piralakkode, Perunkadavila, a village off Neyyattinkara, and the other at Nadayara, a village off Varkala, with the main branch and the two rural branches having separate Kaaranavans (heads of family).

Raman Pillai had two sisters; his elder sister was named Kaaliyamma Pillai Narayani Pillai alias Gowri Amma, and his younger sister was Kaaliyamma Pillai Lakshmi Pillai alias Kunjulakshmi Amma. As the only male member of his generation in the Punnackal family, Kochuraman, as he was fondly called by his mother, and Ramooppy by his uncles and elder sister, was the darling of the family.

Pillai was a social activist and used to organise many social functions in collaboration with literary luminaries like C. V. Raman Pillai and cultural activities involving the city's socio-cultural elite. He took an active part in convening and organising the first all-Kerala Maha Sammelanam in Thiruvananthapuram. He also became a Member of the Royal Asiatic Society (M.R.A.S.).

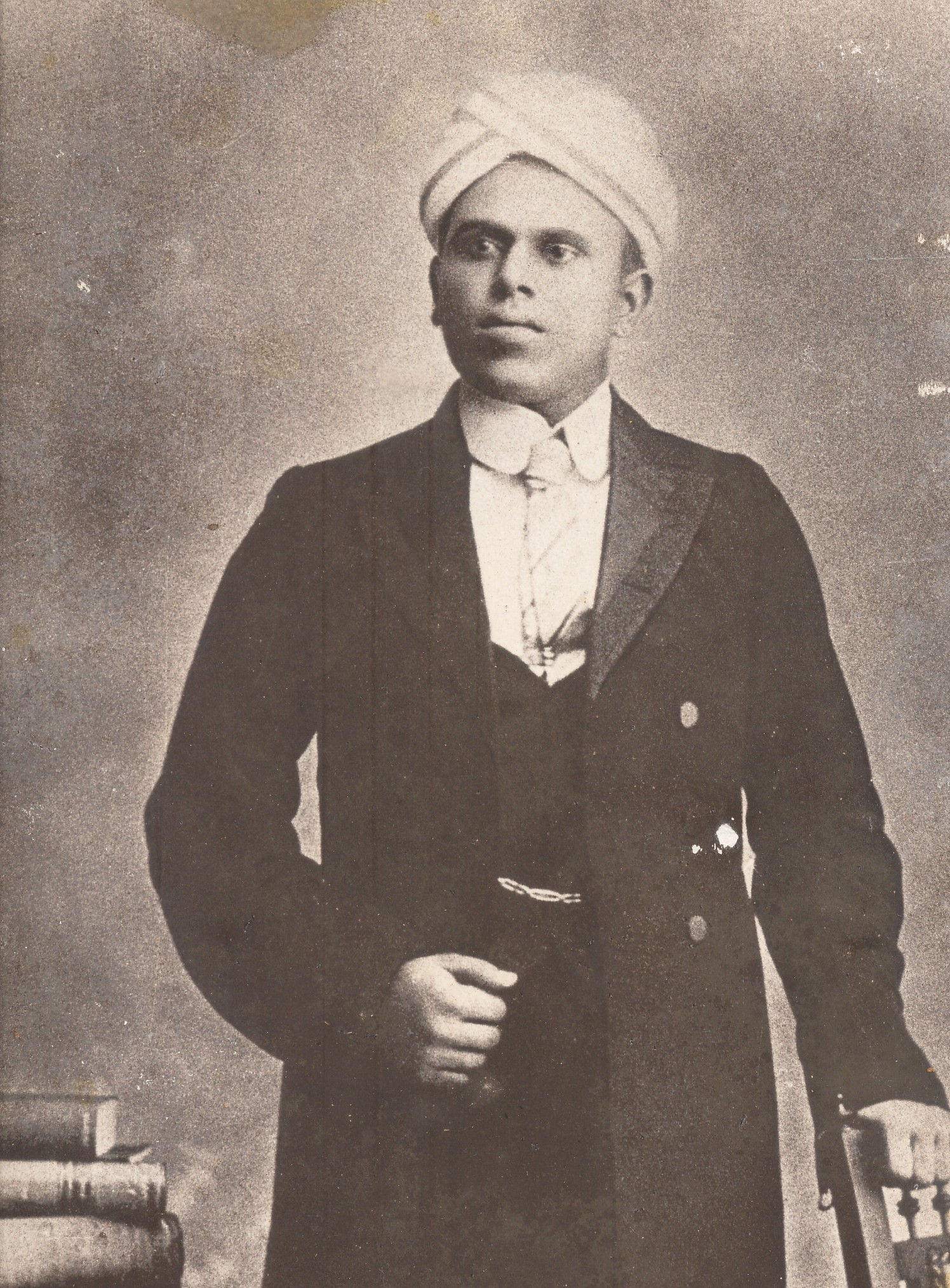
A. R. Pillai in 1905

Pillai gave up his studies after high school matriculation and took to book-selling as a career; he set up an English bookshop, the first such in Thiruvananthapuram, by the side of the main thoroughfare of the city. He used to import English books of every kind from publishers like Blackies & Co. and Longmans Green & Co. in the UK, and also Western musical instruments like piano, violin and cello. Having grown up as a socially prominent and notable youth, A. R. Pillai (then 24) sought the hand of B. Gouri Amma (then 12). Gouri Amma was born on 9 June 1892 as the eldest daughter of C. V. Raman Pillai, a major Malayalam novelist, playwright, newspaper journalist/editor and well-known social activist. The wedding ceremony was consecrated according to the social rites of the Nair community on 23 August 1904.

Four years after his marriage, A. R. Pillai had to close down his bookshop following a tiff with M. Rajaraja Varma, the then Education Secretary of the erstwhile Travancore Government. Varma refused to include any of the large number of English books imported by Pillai from England in the list of textbooks prescribed for the schools in the State. Consequently, A. R. Pillai had to face severe financial problems and wind up his business venture.

== In Europe ==
Pillai then decided to pursue higher studies and seek better avenues of employment. He left for Europe in May 1909 and joined the four-year BSc degree course in Forestry at the University of Edinburgh. After completing the four-year BSc course in Forestry and finishing the written examinations, he went to Germany in October 1913 to prepare a Working Plan on the Black Forest as part of the BSc Forestry course. He spent eight months at the Black Forest and then went to Göttingen in April 1914, joining the Georg-August-Universität Göttingen, named after King George II of Great Britain, to complete his work. Then, unluckily for Pillai, the First World War broke out in 1914, and Pillai got stranded in Göttingen, unable to return to Edinburgh to submit the Working Plan and secure his BSc degree in Forestry. A. R. Pillai, even though he did not then have a basic university degree, was allowed to register and work for a PhD in the Philosophical Faculty of the University of Göttingen and also of the University of Giessen. However, he was able to complete only two courses for the PhD degree before the situation brought about by the First World War came in the way; the monthly remittances of money to A. R. Pillai by his maternal uncle (the head of his matriarchal family, Punnackal) and letters from his mother in Punnackal and his wife and children and his father-in-law, C. V. Raman Pillai, at Rosscote in Thiruvananthapuram, were stopped from August 1914 by the British authorities, Pillai being in their enemy country. It put him in a terrible quandary, having no money even for his daily food.

== Indian Independence Committee ==
Pillai then established close contacts with the few Indians in Germany, including Virendranath Chattopadhyaya, younger brother of Sarojini Naidu; Bhupendranath Datta, younger brother of Narendranath Dutta (Swami Vivekananda); M. Prabhakar; Raja Mahendra Pratap, who became the President of the exile Government of India in Afghanistan during the First World War of 1914–18; and the renowned expatriate Chempakaraman Pillai from Thiruvananthapuram. Chempakaraman Pillai wrote: "I am extremely pleased of your broadminded patriotic sentiments. I did not know you as such until I made your personal acquaintance." A. R. Pillai along with all these compatriots was imprisoned by the German Government on the ground that they were British subjects. However, they were later released when the few Indians there together formed the Indian Independence Committee in Berlin under the chairmanship of Virendranath Chattopadhyaya (referred to, in short, as Chatto). "I assure you I have a great regard for you and a sincere feeling of comradeship especially since we are in the same boat. Please keep us informed of your literary activities.... We must carry out the idea of a book on the National Movement on the lines I suggested", wrote Chatto. On the request of the Indian Independence Committee, A. R. Pillai regularly wrote and published articles condemning British Imperialism and canvassing support for India's struggle for freedom (see copies of letters below). He had also corresponded with veteran freedom fighters of other countries like Sir Roger Casement of Ireland, then under British rule, trying to make common cause for India's freedom struggle abroad. Sir Roger in his letter to A. R. Pillai said: "I can do more than thank you warmly for your letter and express my sincere and deep respect for all like you who set their country's cause above self interest."

During the War, A. R. Pillai wrote several articles in German newspapers and gave lectures in various places in Germany, at various universities and other institutions, on Indian history, culture and architecture. Bhupendranath Datta of the Indian Independence Committee wrote: We want brochures on economic, political, social, religious, etc., showing how British rule is injuring and hindering the development of the Indian people on the above-mentioned lines. Of course the books or booklets will be published in the name of the Committee. Among them was an article in Westermanns Monatshefte of December 1914 which called for German support for the Indian struggle for freedom under the title "Indien und die europäische Krisis" (India and the European Crisis, in translation). Some of these articles and the texts of the lectures were later brought out in book form; eight of these books are listed in the Authors' Catalogue in the Library of the University of Göttingen. One of these books is entitled Deutschland – Indiens Hoffnung (Germany – India's Hope, in translation). He also wrote and published articles on various aspects of life in Germany, such as education in Germany, in the then-famous Indian magazine The Modern Review of Calcutta.

When on 21 February 1918 the Bund der Freunde Indiens (Union of Friends of India) was founded in Berlin for the spreading of knowledge about India, A. R. Pillai along with other prominent Indians including Chempakaraman Pillai, Bhupendranath Datta, Mahendra Pratap and Naik, and Germans like Admiral Recke, Hermann von Staden and L. Viereck, joined the Bund. The first public activity of this new organisation was a reception held in honour of Raja Mahendra Pratap, "the most colourful Indian personality then in Germany" (also called "The Marco Polo of the East"), on 13 April 1918. In a letter to A. R. Pillai, Mahendra Pratap wrote: "I am glad to hear that you are doing a useful service both to your country and mankind at large since the literary service to science is beneficial all round. I am also trying my best to serve our mutual cause according to my light." When the World War ended in the defeat of Germany and its allies, the Indian Independence Committee of Berlin wrote to A. R. Pillai (see letters below), saying that the Committee could not thereafter give him any financial aid or support to continue living in Germany and that he had to fend for himself. The British, even after the War, continued to prevent any letters or money from his home reaching him or his letters reaching anyone in India, considering him an enemy of the British Crown; they would also not allow him to return to India unless he recanted and apologised, which he considered shameful and would not do.

A. R. Pillai then wanted to complete his course of studies for a PhD at the University of Göttingen; however, his straitened circumstances forced him to discontinue his studies and work for his livelihood there. Thus he set up a business firm in partnership with a few German friends for selling and publishing books; this firm was called Firma A. R. Pillai & Co., A. G., Göttingen. The firm was started as a private limited company in May 1922 with a capital of 40,000 marks, and had branches at Bremen and Hamburg. It later grew substantially and was converted into a registered trading company under the Companies Act of Germany with a paid-up capital of 60 million marks, with Pillai serving as general director. A circular issued by the firm, posted from Göttingen to various addresses in India, stated that Pillai, "being an Indian Nationalist, has already devoted more than twenty years of his life for the cause of India's freedom from industrial slavery" and that he believed India could achieve political freedom only through attaining industrial equality with European nations. The firm offered to supply machinery, tools and engineering services to India. British authorities took note of these activities and recommended that the firm be "carefully watched".

Soon, however, some of his German partners fell out with him and he had to approach the judiciary, but he lost the case. Thereupon he founded another company called A. Raman Pillai, Export-Buchhandlung, Göttingen, and imported books from publishers and booksellers all over the world and also published books in German. A prestigious tome in German that his firm published is mentioned in his reply to his father-in-law, C. V. Raman Pillai, who asked him to come back to India. After tackling enormous problems in giving up his firm and getting a fresh passport from the British after undertaking not to involve himself in local politics in India and not to correspond with Germany any more, A. R. Pillai could return to Trivandrum only in October 1926, four and a half years after C. V.'s death on 21 March 1922.

On his return to Trivandrum via Colombo in October 1926 after 18 years abroad, A. R. Pillai was kept under surveillance and spied upon by the British for quite some time at Rosscote, where he lived with his wife and children. (Rosscote is the house built by C. V. Raman Pillai and named after his guru, John Ross, a Scotsman and the first Principal of H.H. The Maharaja's College – now called the University College – in Trivandrum.) He was denied the headship of the undivided matriarchal family, which was his due, and access to the family properties.

He resumed his social activities in Trivandrum. He was on the executive of the All India Exhibition, Fair and Amusement Park in 1934 and all the annual Sree Chitra Exhibitions before and after. In fact, in all these exhibitions, he did the layout and gardening and designed the Ravanan Kotta. He then gradually began to correspond with well-known automobile manufacturing and other business firms in Germany and other European countries with a view to starting his own business firm in Thiruvananthapuram. Pillai acquired the sole agency for the sale of Mercedes-Benz cars in South India, but before he could formally launch his firm and execute the order for the limousine, he died on 7 September 1938, at the age of 58, a year before the Second World War broke out. He had lived only about 12 years after returning home. He was survived by his wife Gouri Amma and five children: Thankamma, Kesavan Nair, Rosscote Krishna Pillai, Suseela Bai and Padmanabhan Nair, the last three having been born after his return from Germany.
