= Chempakaraman Pillai =

Indian-born Independence activist

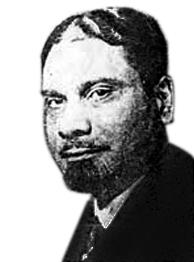
- Born: 15 September 1891; Trivandrum, Kingdom of Travancore, British India
- Died: 26 May 1934 (aged 42); Berlin, Nazi Germany
- Other name: Champak
- Organization(s): Berlin Committee, Provisional Government of India
- Movement: Indian Independence movement, Indo-German Conspiracy

Chempakaraman Pillai (alias Venkidi; 15 September 1891 – 26 May 1934) was an Indian-born independence activist and revolutionary. Born in Thiruvananthapuram, he left for Europe as a youth, where he spent the rest of his active life as an Indian nationalist and revolutionary.

Although his life was mired in controversies, including a squabble with Adolf Hitler, information on his life in Europe was sketchy in the immediate years after his death. More information has come out in recent years.

Chempakaraman Pillai is credited with the coining of the salutation and "Jai Hind" in the pre-independence days of India. The slogan is still widely used in India.

Pillai, who started the Indian National Voluntary Corps on 31 July 1914, was instrumental in inspiring Netaji Subhas Chandra Bose to start the Indian National Army (INA).

== Early life ==
Pillai was born into a Tamil Vellalar family in Thiruvananthapuram, capital of the erstwhile Kingdom of Travancore in the modern state of Kerala. His parents, Chinnaswami Pillai and Nagammal, hailed from Nanjinad (Then Travancore, present-day Kanyakumari district, Tamil Nadu). He left India in 1908 at the age of 17 with the help of a European.

== In Europe ==
Pillai attended ETH Zurich from October 1910 until 1914, pursuing a diploma in Engineering. After the outbreak of the First World War, he founded the International Pro-India Committee and based its headquarters in Zürich, appointing himself president in September 1914. He also published a magazine under the name Pro India. During the same period an Indian Independence Committee was formed in Berlin by a group of Indian expatriates in Germany. This latter group was composed of Virendranath Chattopadhyaya, Bhupendranath Dutta, A. Raman Pillai, Taraknath Das, Maulavi Barkatullah, Chandrakant Chakravarty, M. Prabhakar, Birendra Sarkar, and Heramba Lal Gupta.

In October 1914, Pillai moved to Berlin and joined the Berlin Committee, merging it with his International Pro-India Committee as the guiding and controlling institution for all pro-Indian revolutionary activities in Europe. Apart from Chattopadhyaya, Pillai was the only member of the Berlin group who was at all known; the rest were students who had responded to the call to serve their country. Lala Har Dayal was also persuaded to join the movement. Both of them cooperated with the German Intelligence Bureau for the East and helped creating German propaganda directed at Indian PoWs in German camps, particularly the Halbmondlager. In Berlin, he delivered anti-British lectures before large audiences, and collaborated with the Berlin-India Committee in efforts to raise an Indian Nationalist Army Corps from among prisoners of war and Indian residents in Mesopotamia, Turkey and Syria. By the middle of 1916, branch offices of the Indian Committee had been established in Zürich, Amsterdam, and Stockholm, headed respectively by Dasgupta, Pillai, and Chattopadhyaya.

From his position in charge of the Committee's contacts with the outside world through Holland, Pillai devised a plan to revive Indian revolutionary activities in East Asia. He was acquainted with the Indonesian nationalist exile Dr. Daus Dekkar, who had come to Berlin from Zürich in early January 1915 at Barakatullah's request. Pillai first asked Daus Dekkar to arrange the distribution of propaganda leaflets through Holland; then in July 1915 he proposed that Daus Dekkar travel to Thailand to establish a centre of Indian propaganda and foster cooperation between Indian and Indonesian nationalists. After jointly discussing the plan with Wesendonck of the German Foreign Office, Daus Dekkar departed Rotterdam on 8 September 1915, travelling via the United States, where he met Ramchandra at San Francisco, and then on to Tokyo and Bangkok. However, he was arrested at Hong Kong and confessed everything. Coming on the heels of earlier setbacks, the failure of this mission effectively ended Indian revolutionary efforts in South-East Asia.

== SMS Emden bombing of British Madras ==
On 22 September 1914, The SMS Emden, a German warship commanded by Captain Karl von Muller entered the waters off the coast of Madras, and bombed the facilities near the Madras harbour and slipped back into the ocean. The British were taken aback in this sudden attack. His family stated that Pillai coordinated the German attack with his personal presence in the SMS Emden, though this is not the official view. In any case, it is widely believed that Pillai and some Indian revolutionaries had a hand in the SMS Emden bombing of Madras.

== War activities ==
Indian Independence Committee ultimately became involved in the Hindu–German Conspiracy along with the Ghadar Party in the United States. The German foreign office under Kaiser Wilhelm II funded the Committee's anti-British activities. Chempakaraman and A. Raman Pillai, both from Travancore and both students at German universities, worked together on the Committee. Pillai later allied with Indian National Army chief Subhas Chandra Bose.

Many of Pillai's letters to A. Raman Pillai, then a student in the University of Göttingen, were kept by Raman Pillai's son Rosscote Krishna Pillai. The letters reveal some aspects of Pillai's life in Germany between 1914 and 1920, as does one of July 1914, calling upon Indian soldiers in the British Indian Army to rise in revolt and fight against the British.

After the end of World War I and Germany's defeat, Pillai stayed in Germany, working as a technician in a factory in Berlin; when Netaji Subhas Chandra Bose visited Vienna, Pillai met him and explained his plan of action.

== Post-war activism in Germany ==
In 1919, Pillai formed the German-Indian League to continue his political activities in support of Indian independence. By 1924, he was actively supporting the German "Nationalist Party" and delivered a lecture under the auspices of the League of Oppressed Peoples on "Indian Right to Freedom" and the "Gandhi Movement".

In 1926, the Government of India intercepted a letter addressed by Pillai to the editor of the newspaper Navayuha, published from Hyderabad. The letter was communicated to the Madras Government with instructions to take precautionary measures to deal with him if he returned to India, on account of his seditious and anti-British activities.

== Foreign Minister of Provisional Government of India ==
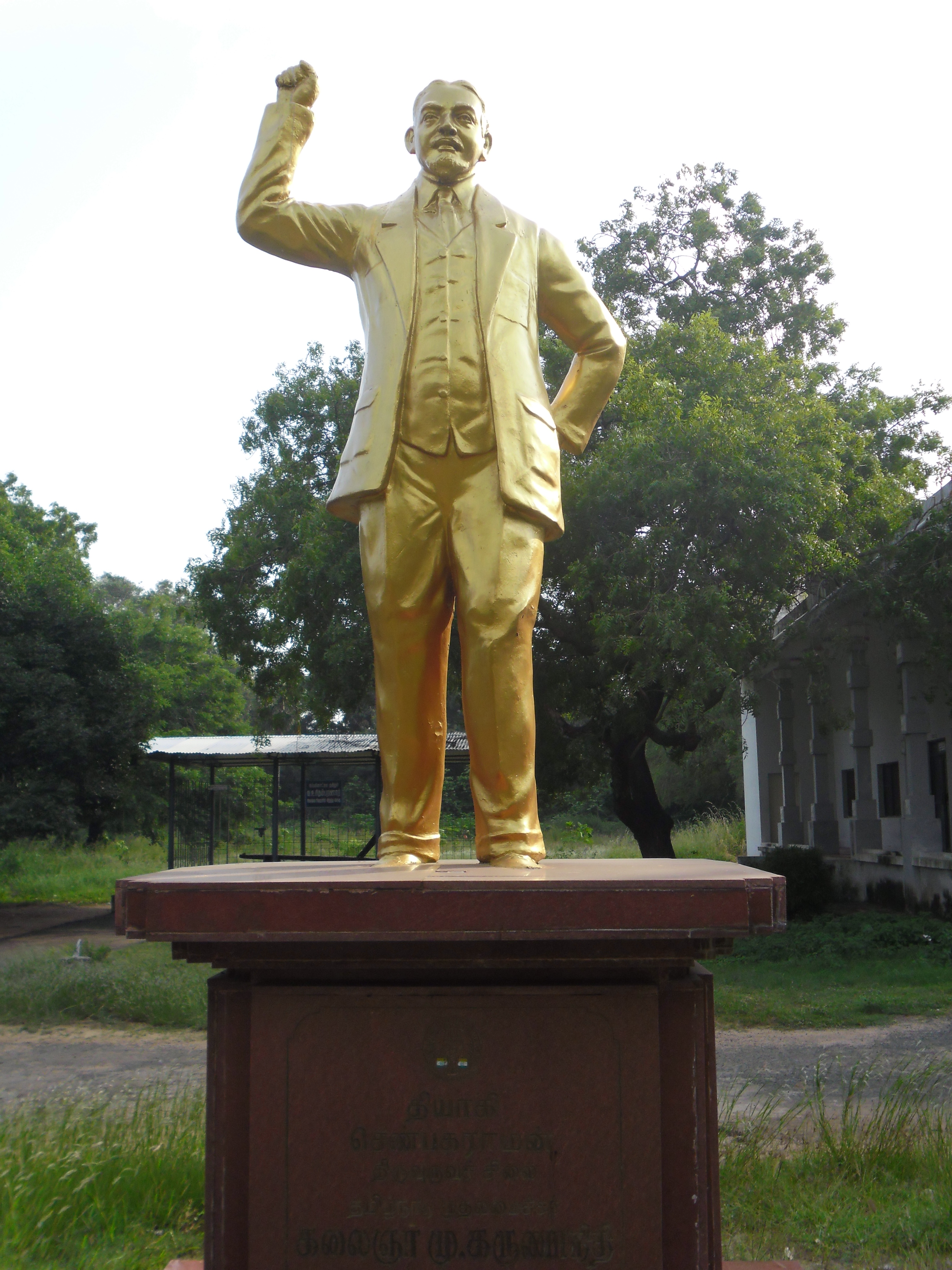
Chempakaraman statue in Chennai

Pillai was the foreign minister of the Provisional Government of India set up in Kabul, Afghanistan on 1 December 1915, with Raja Mahendra Pratap as President and Maulana Barkatullah as Prime Minister. However, the defeat of the Germans in the war shattered the hopes of the revolutionaries, and the British forced them out of Afghanistan in 1919.

During this time, the Germans were helping the Indian revolutionaries from their own motives. Though the Indians made it clear to the Germans that they were equal partners in their fight against the common enemy, the Germans wanted to use the revolutionaries' propaganda work and military intelligence for their own purposes.

In 1907, Pillai coined the term "Jai Hind", which was adopted as a slogan of the Indian National Army in the 1940s at the suggestion of Abid Hasan. After India's independence, it emerged as a national slogan.

== Marriage and death ==
In 1931, Pillai married Lakshmi Bai of Manipur, whom he had met in Berlin. Unfortunately they had a short life together, as Pillai soon fell ill. There were symptoms of slow poisoning and he went to Italy for treatment.

Pillai died in Berlin on 28 May 1934. Lakshmibai brought his ashes to British India in 1935 where they were later ceremonially immersed in Kanyakumari with full state honours. It was Pillai's final wish that his ashes be sprinkled in Nanjinad (Kanyakumari), his family's native place.
