= Swami Vivekananda's prayer to Kali at Dakshineswar =

Vivekananda's prayer to Kali at Dakshineswar
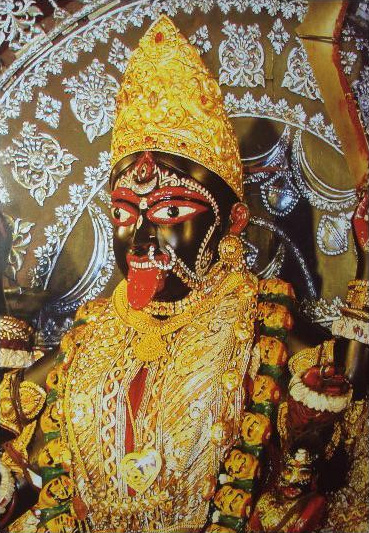
- Idol of Goddess Kali at Dakshineshwar
- Date: 16 September 1884 (Tuesday)
- Location: Dakshineswar Kali Temple, Calcutta, Bengal; 22°39′18″N 88°21′28″E
- Participants: Ramakrishna; Swami Vivekananda
- Incident in brief: Narendranath intended to pray for financial welfare, but ultimately prayed for pure knowledge, devotion and renunciation
- Significance: Notable event and turning point in the life of Vivekananda

Vivekananda's prayer to Kali at Dakshineswar is an event which occurred in September 1884 when Swami Vivekananda (then known as Narendranath Dutta), following the suggestion of Ramakrishna, went to the Kali temple of Dakshineswar with the intention to pray for financial welfare, but ultimately prayed for pure knowledge, devotion and renunciation. This event has been a subject of scholarly studies and is considered as a significant event in the life of Vivekananda, who initially revolted against idol-worship but now accepted and prayed before an idol of Kali. This incident added a new change to Narendra's devotion and knowledge.

After making three attempts to seek a blessing to remove his financial problems from mother Goddess Kali, he came out with the divine statement: "Mother, I want nothing but knowledge and devotion!"

== Background ==
Vivekananda was born Narendranath Datta on 12 January 1863 in an affluent family of North Calcutta. His father Vishwanath Datta was a lawyer and had a fair income, but he used to spend more than his earnings. In February 1884, when Narendranath was preparing for his upcoming F. A. examinations, Vishwanath Datta died. Vishwanath's sudden death left the Datta family bankrupt; creditors began demanding the repayment of loans, and relatives threatened to evict the family from their ancestral home. Narendra, once a son of a well-to-do family, became one of the poorest students in his college. Narendra was the eldest son of Vishwanath and had to take responsibility of his family. He tried to find a job but failed. He also failed to earn the basic needs of life for his family. None of their wealthy friends and relatives, who could easily help them, came forward to provide any kind of assistance. This was the first time in his life, when he saw the cruel form of life.

Vivekananda recounted his experiences of these days—

I was dying of starvation. Bare-footed, I went from office to office and was refused everywhere. I learnt by experience what human compassion is. This was my first contact with the realities of life; and I discovered it... had no room for the weak, the poor, the deserted...

Narendranath became acquainted with the 19th-century mystic saint Ramakrishna in 1881, and used to go to Dakshineswar frequently to meet Ramakrishna. In this difficult phase, his visit to Dakshineswar increased, and he found solace in Ramakrishna.

In the initial meeting with Ramakrishna, Narendra had resisted to accept or worship Kali the goddess whom Ramakrishna used to worship. Ramakrishna asked him— "Why do you come here, if you do not accept Kali, my Mother?" Narendra replied, "simply because I come to see you? I come to you because I love you."

== Prayer to goddess Kali at Dakshineswar ==
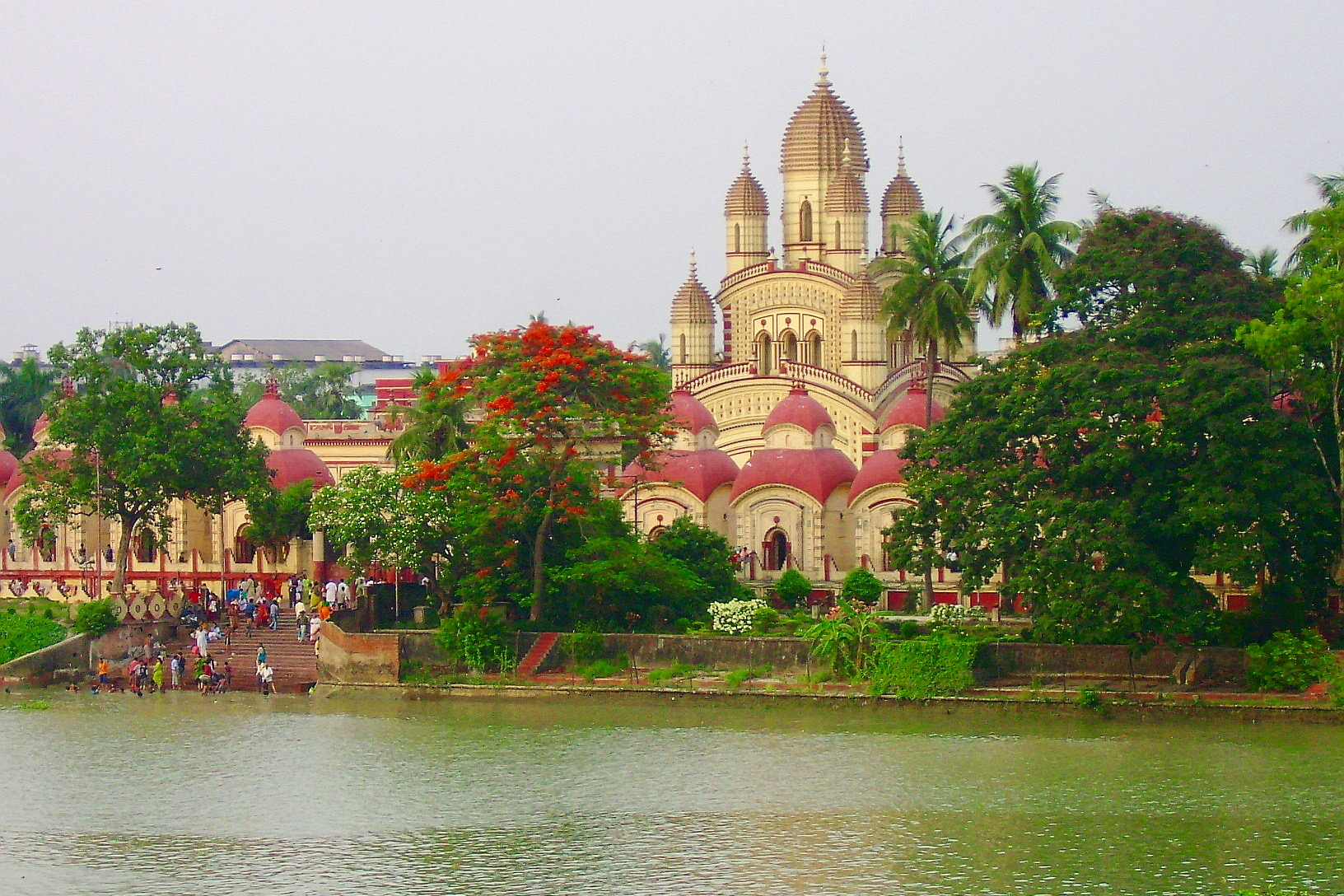
Dakshineswar Kali Temple built in 1855 is of the Divine Mother Goddess Kali, known as Bhavatarini

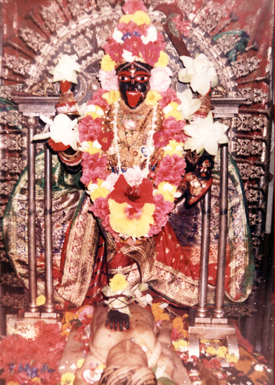
The idol of Goddess Kali at the temple

One day on the 16th of September, Narendra requested Ramakrishna to pray to Goddess Kali, the Divine Mother, for some financial welfare, which was the immediate need of his family. Ramakrishna listened to his request and told him that the day was a Tuesday, an "auspicious day", asked him to go to the temple in the evening and pray it himself Ramarkishna also told Narendra about the mother Goddess: She is absolute knowledge, the supreme power of Bramhan (The Universe) and by her mere will she has given birth to this world. Everything is in her power to give." Narendra then believed the words of his master and decided to approach Mother Kali and pray to her to rescue him of his financial problems.

=== First attempt to pray for financial welfare ===
Following the suggestion, at 9 o'clock in the evening, Narendra prepared himself to go to the temple. As he entered the temple and looked at the image of Kali, he was overawed with a great feeling of devotion and love. He went to the temple of Kali and stood in front of the idol, bowed to Goddess Kali in an "ecstasy of joy" and started repeating her name. Standing before the Divine Mother, he felt she was "living and conscious, full of divine love and beauty". He prayed to the Goddess for divine knowledge and devotion, and for her eternal divine visions, but forgot to pray for financial welfare for which he had come.

=== Second attempt to pray for financial welfare ===
When Narendra came to Ramakrishna, who was sitting outside the temple, Ramakrishna asked him, "Did you pray for your family wants?". Narendra was puzzled and confessed that he had forgotten to do so. Upon knowing this, Ramakrishna asked him to go to the temple and pray for the second time.

In accordance with Ramakrishna's suggestion, Narendra went to the Kali temple once again. Like the last time, he stood before the idol of goddess Kali, bowed to her and started praying. He prayed— "Give me discrimination and divine knowledge. Grant me mother your unhindered vision", but, once again he forgot to pray for his family wants. Then Ramakrishna admonished him saying "how thoughtless! Couldn’t you restrain yourself enough to say those few words?

=== Third attempt to pray for financial welfare ===
Narendra came back to Ramakrishna, who once again asked him if he had prayed for financial support that time. Once again, Narendra answered in negative and confessed that he had forgotten. Ramakrishna asked him to attempt for the third time to pray for his family's immediate need.

Narendra went to Kali temple for the third time. He tried to pray for what he was suggested, but started feeling ashamed of himself for attempting to pray to worldly and material things. So he returned to Ramakrishna without praying for any kind of financial welfare. Ramakrishna was pleased to learn that his disciple's spiritual inclination and did a forecast that Narendra's family would never face lack of essentials of living like food and clothes. Finally Narendra in his own words said "I had to accept her at last!". It was the end of his six years of "hate of Kali! And all her ways!"

Following this eventful revelation of Goddess Kali, he would say, "I can not but believe that there is somewhere a great power that thinks of herself as feminine called Kali and Mother".

== Vivekananda's later years thoughts ==
After becoming an ardent devotee of goddess Kali, Vivekananda would say that Kali was the "Divine Mother of the Universe" who is "embodied in Herself, creation and destruction, love and terror, life and death."

In later years when Vivekananda went to the west to preach and teach Vedanta, in his letters to Sister Nivedita he would say that Mother was protecting him and giving him emotional support. He even said that "Kali worship is my special habit" and also clarified that he never preached Kali worship to anyone, as this worship was his secret.

== Scholarly interpretations ==
According to Vivekananda's biographer B. R. Kishore, "This incident added a new dimension to Narendra's devotion and knowledge. Till now, he had been against image-worship. He had refused to accept the Divine Mother. But now he had become an ardent devotee of the Mother." Elizabeth Harding, in her book "Kali: The Black Goddess of Dakshineswar" also felt, this was a "turning point" in Narendra's life.

Amiya P. Sen has written, this incident "deepened" Narendra's "spiritual quest" and after this incident he started frequently meditating at Panchavati, a lonely lace in Dakshineswar. Swami Nikhilananda has said, Narendra had two options, he could pray for either a happy worldly life or spiritual progress and independence, and he chose the second one.
