= Arayoor Sree Mahadevar =

Arayoor Sree Mahadevar Temple Temple
- Sree Mahadevar Temple, Arayoor, Thiruvananthapuram, Kerala

Religion
- Affiliation: Hinduism
- District: Thiruvananthapuram
- Deity: Sree Mahadevar

Location
- Location: Arayoor
- State: Kerala
- Country: India
- Coordinates: 8°21′23″N 77°07′18″E

Architecture
- Type: Architecture of Kerala

Specifications
- Temple: One
- Elevation: 45.61 m (150 ft)

Arayoor Major Sree Mahadevar Temple (ആറയൂർ ശ്രീ മഹാദേവർ) is one of the major worship places in Arayoor in Thiruvananthapuram district, Kerala, very close to Tamil Nadu border. It is a Shiva temple. Arayoor Shiva is fondly called Arayoorappan. The temple comes under the control of Travancore Devaswom Board.

The Upaprathistas are Sree Ganesh, Durga, Murugan, Nandikesan, Lord Ayyappa, Bhoothathan, Nagaraja, and Yakshiyamma.

== Festivals ==
Arayoor Temple festival is one of the grandest festivals in Neyyattinkara Taluk, normally celebrated during February and March months.

The festivities starts with Thrikkodiyettu (Hoisting of the Temple Flag ) on the first day. The traditional Ghoshayathra is on the 9th-day of the festival. Aarattu festival is the closing ceremony of the ten-day festival. On the Tenth day around evening, in a Solemn Ceremony the Flag is lowered and the Deity is then taken for the Aarattu (Holy Bath) in the nearby temple pond. A variety of cultural programmes are also arranged during these days.

== Temple timings ==
The temple opens daily at 4:30 a.m., closes at 10:30 a.m., reopens at 5:30 p.m. and closes at 8.30 p.m.
