= Arayoor =

Village in Thiruvananthapuram District, Kerala, India

Arayoor is a small village in Neyyattinkara Taluk in Thiruvananthapuram District, India. It comes under Chenkal Panchayath. It belongs to South Kerala Division. Arayoor is located 5 km from Parassala, 6 km from Neyyattinkara and 30 km from Thiruvananthapuram. The village has a post office. The Arayoor pin code is 695122.

Arayoor has gained recognition for the great saint of Abhedashrama, Swami Abhedanandhiji. Writer C. V. Raman Pillai and Travancore General officer commanding Maj Gen V. N. Parameswaran Pillai (Kuttan Pillai) were born in Arayoor.

Udiyankulangara, Neyyattinkara, Parassala are close. Dhanuvachapuram and Parassala are nearby railway stations. Malayalam is the local language and agriculture is the main occupation of the people. A large proportion of them work outside India, mainly in the Middle East. There is a cashew nut factory in the village. A village contains many man made ponds and is surrounded by agricultural land. The major crops cultivated include Banana, Tapioca, and cucumber(seasonal).

== Famous persons ==
- C. V. Raman Pillai - Novelist, playwright, journalist, social activist
- Maj Gen V.N. Parameswaran Pillai – the last General officer commanding of the Travancore Nair Army
- Most Rev Dr Vincent Samuel - Archbishop of Neyyattinkara

== Temple ==
Arayoor Major Sree Mahadeva Temple

Aarayoor Major Sree Mahadevar temple is a major place of worship in Arayoor. People worship the deity Lord Mahadeva there. Arayoor Shiva is fondly called Arayoorappan. The Upaprathistas here are Sree Ganesh, Durga, Murugan, Nandikesan, Lord Ayyappa, Bhoothathan, Nagaraja, Yakshiyamma etc.

== Churches ==
- C.S.I
- St. Elizabeth Church
- India Assemblies of God
- Bible Faith Mission

== Others ==
- P.R.D.S

== Schools ==
- Govt. L.V.H.S.S. Arayoor.
- L.M.S.L.P.S. Arayoor.
- Fathima Public School, Arayoor http://www.fps.edu.in/

== Banks ==
- Arayoor Service Co. Bank Ltd.

== Offices ==
- KELPALM, Kerala State Palmyrah Products development Welfare Corporation Ltd, Kelpalm Facility Centre, Kottamam, Arayoor P.O

== Library ==
- C.V. Raman Pillai Memorial Library

== Arts and sports clubs ==
- C.V.R. Arts
- Arayoor Grama Seva Samithi
- ASVAS
- Chaithram
- Friends

== Studios ==
- Pranavam

== Nearby places ==
- Udiyankulangara
- Kottamam
- Puthukulam
- Ponvila
- Pottayilkada
- Plamoottukada
- Thottinkara
- Abhedananda Nagar
- Mariyapuram
- Kochottukonam

== Local places ==
- Mathrakkal
- CVR Nagar
- Punnathanam
- Ponnankara
- Elluvila
- Vattavila
- Mannamkulam
- Nachuvilakam
- Kanjamvila
- Vaniyankala
- Pottakkal
- Ambalathuvila
- Pavarathuvila
- Kalppakaseri
- Kambrakkara
- Enthikkala
- Nandavanathu
- Manaluvila
- Cherukara
- Clavarakkal
- Puliyarakkal
- Deviyarakkal
- Chavalloor Potta
- Koditharakuzhi
- Oottamkulam
- Kannankara
- Muttattukonam
- Kulachavilakam
- Kuttivelil
- Naduvila
- Painkara
- Kumbamvila
- Kalayil
- Kuruvikkadu
- Alathara
- Charakkal
- Pulimoottil
- Arappura
- Pallam
- Machingavilakam
- Varyaveettu vilakam
- Keeramparakkal
- Thoppil
- Kalivilakam
- Kalathuvila
- Vettampalli
- Thottathuvila
- Edatharavila
