= Abinash Chandra Bhattacharya =

Indian nationalist (1882–1963)

Abinash Chandra Bhattacharyya (16 October 1882 Tripura -7 March 1963 Rishra, West Bengal ) was a radical Indian nationalist in the movement for Indian independence who played a role in the Indo-German Conspiracy of World War I. Born in Chunta in the district of Tripura, India, Bhattacharya became involved with the works of the Anushilan Samiti in his youth.

In 1910, Abinash Bhattacharya went to Germany to study chemistry at Martin Luther University of Halle-Wittenberg, where he obtained his PhD.

While in Germany, Bhattacharya again became involved in the Indian nationalist movement there, reviving old acquaintances from his Anushilan days. He was at this time close to Virendranath Chattopadhyaya and Harish-Chandra and, through his acquaintance with the Interior Minister of Prussia, became a founding member of the Berlin Committee, which during the war was involved in a number of failed plans for nationalist revolution within India and mutiny in the Indian Army.

He returned to India in 1914 and founded a chemical factory called "Techno Chemical Laboratory and Works Limited" in Calcutta. He wrote articles on freedom movement Calcutta newspapers and wrote two books on freedom movements abroad.

Bhattacharya died in Rishra in Hooghly district in West Bengal.

== Published works ==
Bhattacharya published the following works:

1. Mukti Kon Pathe (Which Way to Liberation)(?) Provide details
2. Bartaman Rananiti (Modern Science of War)
3. Bahirbharate Bharater Muktiprayasa (India's Freedom Struggle Abroad)
4. Ranosojjaye Germany (Germany in War Formation)
5. Swaraj Sadhana (Striving for Self Rule)
6. Mukti Sadhana (Striving for Liberation)
7. Germany Probasipatro (Letter from Germany)
8. Europe a Bharatio Biplober Sadhana (Indian Revolution in Europe)
