= S. Guptan Nair =

Indian scholar and writer (1919–2006)

Sankara Pillai Guptan Nair
- Born: 22 August 1919; Oachira, Quilon, Travancore (present-day Kollam, Kerala)
- Died: 6 February 2006 (aged 86); Thiruvananthapuram, Kerala
- Spouse: Bhagirathi Amma
- Children: M.G. Sasibhooshan and 2
- Parents: Sankara Pillai; Kali Amma
- Awards: 1967 Kerala Sahitya Akademi Award; 1983 Kendra Sahitya Academy Award; 1998 Vayalar Award; 1999 Vallathol Award; 2005 Ezhuthachan Puraskaram; Lalithambika Antharjanam Award; G. Sankara Kurup Award; C. Achutha Menon Award; Shankara Narayanan Thampi Award; CV Raman Pillai Award; P.N Panicker Award

Sankara Pillai Guptan Nair or S. Guptan Nair (22 August 1919 – 6 February 2006) was an Indian scholar, academic, critic and writer of Malayalam literature.

Known for his literary works as well as for his oratorical skills, Nair was a prolific writer with over 35 books to his credit. He was a distinguished fellow of the Kerala Sahitya Akademi and a recipient of several honours including Kendra Sahitya Academy Award, Kerala Sahitya Akademi Award, Vayalar Award, Vallathol Award and Ezhuthachan Puraskaram, the last one being the highest literary award of the Government of Kerala.

== Life sketch ==
S. Guptan Nair was born in a affluent Nair family at Oachira, a temple town famous for Oachira Parabrahma Temple of Kollam district of the south Indian state of Kerala on August 22, 1919 to Sankara Pillai, a known ayurvedic scholar and physician and his wife, Kali Amma. His early schooling was the local school in Kayamkulam after which he graduated with honours in Malayalam literature from Government Arts College, Thiruvananthapuram in 1941. In 1945, he joined the department of Malayalam of the University College Thiruvananthapuram as a lecturer and before superannuating from service in 1978 as the head of the department of Malayalam of the University of Calicut, he served in many educational institutions across Kerala such as Brennen College, Thalassery; Maharaja's College, Ernakulam and Government Victoria College, Palakkad, as a University Grants Commission (UGC) professor. Later, he chaired the Kerala Sahithya Akademi and the Sahithya Pravarthaka Sahakarana Sangham (SPCS - Writers 'Cooperative Society). Besides, he served as the president of Kerala Sahitya Samithi, Margi, Vidhyabhyasa Sureksha Samithi and Shree Chithirathirunal Granthashala, as the assistant director of Kerala Bhasha Institute and was the editor of publications like Malayali, Grandhalokham and Vigyana Kairali. He was also involved with Education Protection Forum, a movement against student politics in the educational institutions in Kerala.

Guptan Nair was married to Bhagirathi Amma and the couple had three children, B. Lakshmi Kumari, M G Sasibhooshan, a historian and writer, and B. Sudha Kumari. Nair died in a private hospital in Thiruvananthapuram on February 6, 2006, succumbing to respiratory illnesses, at the age of 86.

== Literary career ==
Guptan Nair was considered by many as one of great critics of modern Malayalam literature. He dealt with complex literary topics in a simple style, found in books such as Isangalkkappuram, a literary study which received the Kerala Sahitya Akademi Award for Literary Criticism. Asthiyude Pookkal, Changampuzha Kaviyum Kavithayum, a study on the life and literature of Changampuzha Krishna Pillai is another of his notable works. Books such as Krantha Darsikal, Navamalika and Gadyam Pinnitta Vazhikal are counted among his major works. Apart from several essay anthologies and biographies, he also edited a dictionary, the N B S Concise English-Malayalam Dictionary of National Book Stall. His memoirs is titled Maanasasmarami. He was also instrumental in publishing a number of letters written by his friend and poet, G. Sankara Kurup as well as the writings of Kutti Kunju Thankachi, the 19th century writer and the daughter of Irayimman Thampi, which was edited and published by Guptan Nair under the title, Kuttikunju Thankachiyude Kruthikal in 1979.

== Awards and honours ==
The Kerala Sahitya Akademi instituted an annual award for literary criticism in 1966. the award for the second year was awarded to Guptan Nair, for his work, Isangalkkappuram. Nair received the Kendra Sahitya Akademi Award in 1983 and the Lalithambika Antharjanam Award in 1995. Kerala Sahitya Akademi honoured him with the distinguished fellowship in 1996 and two years later, he received the Vayalar Award. The Vallathol Award reached him in 1999 and the Government of Kerala awarded him their highest literary honour of the Ezhuthachan Puraskaram in 2005. He was also a recipient of G. Sankara Kurup Award, C. Achutha Menon Award, R. Sankaranarayanan Thampi Award, CV Raman Pillai Award and P. N. Panicker Award.

=== Guptan Nair Award ===
A foundation in Nair's name, Prof. Guptan Nair Foundation, instituted an annual award, Guptan Nair Award in 2007 in his honour. The award carries ₹ 25,000 cash prize, a citation and a plaque and M. Leelavathi received the inaugural award. Ambalapuzha Rama Varma (2008), Sukumar Azhikode (2009), Hridayakumari (2010), G. Balakrishnan Nair (2011), O. N. V. Kurup (2012) Panmana Ramachandran Nair (2013), Puthussery Ramachandran (2015) and K. P. Sankaran (2019) are some of the recipients of the award.

== Bibliography ==
=== Literary criticism and essays ===
- Guptan Nair, S. (1958). Krantha Dharsikal. S.P.C.S.
- Guptan nair. S (1964). Samalochana. Kottayam: N.B.S.
- Guptan Nair, S. (1967). Isangalkappuram.
- Guptan Nair. S (1969). Adhunikasahithyam. Kottayam: NBS. Archived from the original on 9 February 2019.
- S. Guptan Nair (1982). Thiranjedutha Prabandhangal (in Malayalam). Sahityapravarttaka Sahakaranasangham : Nasanal Bukkstal. p. 325.
- Guptan Nair. S (1990). Amruthasmruthi. Grandakartha: Grandakartha.
- Guptan Nair, S. (1991). Navamalika. Thrissur: Current.
- Guptan Nair, S. (1992). Paaschaathyakathakal. Thrissur: Kerala Sahitya Academy.
- Guptan Nair S (1994). Malayala Niroopanam - Innale. Kerala Bhasha Institute, Thiruvananthapuram: Kerala Bhasha Institute, Thiruvananthapuram. Archived from the original on 9 February 2019.
- Guptan Nair (1998). Ramayana Samgraham.
- S. Guptan Nair (1998). Asthiyude Pookkal Changampuzha Kaviyum Kavithayum (in Malayalam). DC Books. p. 171. ISBN 978-81-7130-862-0.
- Guptan Nair S (1999). Srushtiyum Srashtavum. D.C Books, Kottayam: D.C Books, Kottayam.
- Guptan Nair, S. (2001). Gadyam Pinnitta Vazhikal. Kottayam: D. C. Books. ISBN 9788126403332.
- Guptan Nair, S. (2002). Kesariyute Vimarsam. Thrissur: Kerala Sahitya Academy. ISBN 9788176900478.
- Guptan Nair; Vedabendhu (2004). Yaskamuniyude Nirukthopakramam. Thiruvananthapuram: State Institute of Languages. ISBN 9788176384230.
- Guptan Nair, S. (2004). Keralavum Sangeethavum. Kozhikode: Poorna. ISBN 9788130001258.
- Guptan Nair, S. (2004). Kaavya Swaroopam. Kozhikode: Lipi Publications.
- S. Guptan nair (2007). Gupthan Nayarude Lekhanangal. Mathrubhumi Books. Archived from the original on 9 February 2019.
- S. Guptan Nair (2007). Samalochanayum Punaralochanayum (in Malayalam). DC Books. ISBN 978-81-264-1479-6.
- S. Guptan Nair (2010). Thookkakkarante Chiri. Poorna Publications. Archived from the original on 9 February 2019.
- S. Guptan Nair (2012). Thirayum Chuzhiyum. Lipi Publications. ISBN 978-8188012879.

=== Biographical works ===
- Guptan Nair. S (1974). Tagore Kaviyum Manushyanum. Kumar.K.S. Archived from the original on 9 February 2019.
- Guptan Nair, S. (1992). C. V. Raman Pillai. New Delhi: Sahitya Akademi.
- Guptan Nair, S. Adhythmika Vavodanathinte Shilpikal. Kozhikode: Mathrubhumi books.

=== Memoirs ===
- S. Guptan Nair (1 January 2007). Manasasmarami (in Malayalam). DC Books. p. 348. ISBN 978-81-264-1247-1.

=== Translations into other languages ===
- S. Guptan Nair (1 January 1996). Aayda Malayala Sanna Kathegalu (in Kannada). Translated by K. K. Nair. Sahitya Akademi Publications. ISBN 978-81-260-0029-6.

=== Edited works ===
- S. Guptan Nair (1979). Kuttikunju Thankachiyude Kruthikal. Kerala Sahitya Akademi.
- S. Guptan Nair (1985). Guptan Nair, S. (ed.). Thunchan prabandhangal. Thrissur: Kerala Sahitya Akademi.
- Guptan Nair. S (1990). Dr. Godavarmayude Prabandangal. Thiruvananthapuram Kerala Bhasha Institute: Thiruvananthapuram Kerala Bhasha Institute.
- Guptan Nair S (1992). Pashathyakathakal. Kerala Sahitya Academy: Kerala Sahitya Academy.
- Gupthan Nair S, ed. (1997). Kerala Bhasha Nighandu. Thiruvananthapuram: Kerala Bhasha Institute.
- S. Guptan Nair. N B S Concise English-Malayalam Dictionary. Sahitya Pravarthaka Sahakarana Sangham.

== Writings on Guptan Nair ==
- Narayanakkuruppu, P.; Vasudevan Pillai, A. M., eds. (2015). Prof. S Guptan Nair: Vyakti, Nirupakan, Adhyapakan. Thiruvananthapuram: Kerala Bhasha Institute. ISBN 9788176389808.
- Ramachandran Nair, K., ed. (1994). S Guptan Nair Vyakriyum Nirupakanum. Kottayam: D C Books.
