= M. G. Sasibhooshan =

Indian historian

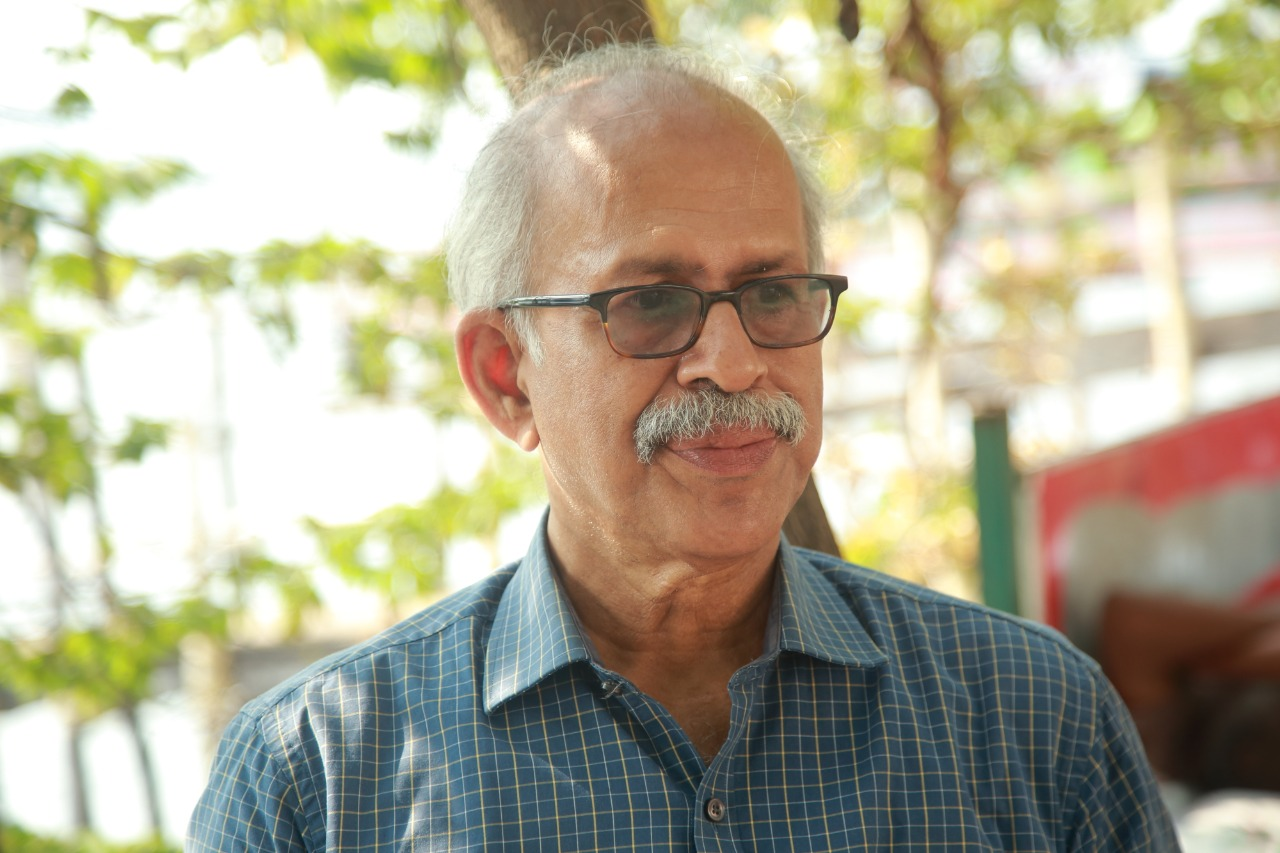
- Born: 1 January 1951 (age 75); Kayamkulam, Quilon, Travancore-Cochin (present-day Kerala)
- Occupations: Historian; writer; speaker; educationist; numismatist
- Spouse: S. Bindu
- Children: 2
- Parents: S. Gupthan Nair; Bhagirathi Amma

Mundathu Gupthan Sasibhooshan (1 January 1951) is an orator, writer, art historian, and consultant in Indology, based in Thiruvananthapuram, Kerala, India.

== Early life ==
Mundathu Gupthan Sasibhooshan is the son of S. Guptan Nair, a critic in Malayalam literature. He started his career as a sub-editor for Malayala Manorama and Mathrubhumi newspapers and then went on to teach for 18 years at the University of Kerala in Thiruvananthapuram. He has researched on murals and sculptures of more than 300 temples in South India and in snake worship and temple history of Kerala.

== Career ==
He was part of the executive committee for the Kerala Sahithya Akademi, Kerala Kalamandalam and the Numismatic Society of India. Under deputation, he also held the office of Director at State Literacy Mission Kerala for a brief period. He was instrumental in setting up the Institute of Mural Painting in Guruvayoor, established to foster the temple art. He was also the former director at Vylopilli Samskriti Bhavan and is a patron of Chinmaya Mission Thiruvananthapuram.

He has published numerous articles and books on Kerala art and culture in English and Malayalam. Sasibhooshan has co-authored many articles in English with his wife Bindu S.

== Personal life ==
He married Bindu Sasibhooshan. The couple has two children Gautam and Gayathri.

== Bibliography ==
- Dr.M.G. Sasibhooshan(1994)Kerathile Chuvar Chitrangal. Kerala Bhasha Institute. ISBN 9788120044111.
- Murals of Kerala. Thiruvananthapuram: Department of Public Relations.
- Ganga Muthal Kaveri Vare. D C Books.
- Dr.M.G. Sasibhooshan(2005) കേരളീയരുടെ ദേവതശങ്കൽപം. DC Books. 2005. ISBN 8126410442.
- Keralathile Daru Shilpangal
- Keraleeya Kaladarshanam. Kerala Basha Institute. ISBN 9788176389297.
- Asethu Himachalam
- Charithram Kuricha Sree Padmanabha Swami Kshethram. DC Books. 2011. ISBN 9788126433513. Archived from the original on 25 March 2017.
- Kerala Charithram Apriya Neerikshanangal
- Sree Padamabha Swamy Temple. Stark World Publishing Private Limited. 21 August 2017.
- Kerala charitrathilekkulla Nattuvazhikal
- Dr.M.G. Sasibhooshan(2017)അത്താഴപ്പഷ്ണിക്കാരുണ്ടോ. DC Books. 2017. ISBN 9789386680310.
- Dr.M.G. Sasibhooshan(2017)അറിയപ്പെടാത്ത അനന്തപുരി. Poorna Publications. 2017. ISBN 9788130019413.
- Dr.M.G. Sasibhooshan (2019)ദേശചരിത്രം കേരളീയക്ഷേത്രങ്ങളിലൂടെ. DC Books. 2019. ISBN 9789352826803.
