= Easwara Pillai Vicharippukar =

Indian Kathakali actor and media pioneer (1815–1874)

- Born: Kumaran Easwaran c. 1815 (990 M.E., month of Medam); Aanaavoor Daesam, Perumkadavila, Neyyattinkara Taluk, Kingdom of Travancore
- Died: 1874; Thiruvananthapuram, Kingdom of Travancore
- Occupations: Kathakali actor, printing press proprietor
- Notable work: Established Kerala Vilasam Press; published first anthology of Attakathas
- Spouse: Four wives (see Personal life)
- Children: Multiple (see Personal life)

Kumaran Easwaran (990–1049 M.E.; 1815–1874 CE), known as Easwara Pillai Vicharippukar, was an Indian Kathakali actor and media pioneer in the Kingdom of Travancore. Regarded as one of the greatest Kathakali artists of the 19th century, he was the leading performer of the Valia Kottaaram Kathakali Yogam (Royal Palace Kathakali Troupe) under Maharaja Uthram Thirunal Marthanda Varma (r. 1847–1861). He also established the Kerala Vilasam Achhukkoodam (Kerala Vilasam Press), one of the earliest printing presses set up by a private citizen in Kerala, and published the first compiled anthology of 54 Attakathas (Kathakali plays).

The honorific Vicharippukar (Manager) was his palace title, conferred when the Maharaja appointed him as the Palliyara Vicharippukar (Bedroom Manager) of the royal household in 1849 CE.

== Early life and adoption ==
Easwaran was born in 990 M.E. (c. 1815 CE) in Ashwati Nakshatram during the month of Medam, in the Arappurayum Veedu of Aanaavoor Daesam, Perumkadavila village, Neyyattinkara Taluk. His mother was the elder daughter of Kali Thukka of Arappurayum Veedu, who had married a Namboothiri priest (Poojari) of the Aankode Mahadeva Temple. Easwaran's mother died before he turned ten, and he was raised by his mother's younger sister.

Through a complex process of matrilineal adoption, Easwaran, his elder step-brother Narayanan, and his mother's younger sister were adopted by Chakki Kali — daughter of Kali Poovamma, the elder sister of Kali Thukka — into the Amkode Veedu family of Kumaran Easwaran Kurup. Following this adoption, Easwaran received the name Kanakku Kumaran Easwara Pillai, while his brother became Kanakku Kumaran Narayana Pillai. Narayana Pillai later built the house called Piralakoddu in Perumkadavila.

== Kathakali career ==
=== Training ===
A Kaaryakkaar (Manager) of the Travancore Palace, who hailed from Piralakkodu in Neyyattinkara Taluk and was a grand-uncle of I.S. Narayana Pillai (later Secretary to the Travancore State Government), noticed the young Easwaran's striking physique and physiognomy as highly suitable for Kathakali performance. He brought Easwaran to Thiruvananthapuram and introduced him to Maharaja Uthram Thirunal Marthanda Varma.

Impressed by Easwaran's appearance and potential, the Maharaja enrolled him in the Palace Kathakali Yogam (Royal Troupe). Easwaran received rigorous training under several eminent gurus:

- Kudamaloor Vilaayikkottu Illathu Eravi Namboothiri — initial three-year training in foundational Kathakali performance
- Valiya Kochaiyappa Panikkar and Kochoonjan — further foundational training
- Poyilath Shekhara Varier — specialist training for approximately eighteen months in the Kaplingaadan style of Kathakali, specifically to enact the four Attakathas of Kottayath Thampuran. Shekhara Varier was brought from Ponnani in south Malabar by the Maharaja in 1846 CE for this purpose.
- Ammannur Cheriya Parameswara Chakyar — the celebrated Koodiyattam master, nephew of Valia Parameswara Chakyar, who trained Easwaran in the refined nuances of Abhinaya (dramatic expression). The Chakyar stayed in Thiruvananthapuram for four months and performed Asokavanikamkom Koodiyattam seven times specifically to instruct Easwara Pillai. This was considered exceptional, as Chakyars traditionally did not train persons outside their own community.

The Maharaja also engaged literary scholars (Vidwaans) to educate Easwaran in the Puranas, Kavyas, and Sanskrit drama.

=== Synthesis of Kathakali styles ===
The Maharaja's training programme for Easwaran was part of a broader effort to refine and systematize the art of Kathakali. At the time, three major styles or schools of Kathakali existed: Kaplingaadan, Kalladikkodan, and Vettath, each emphasizing different aspects such as Kalaasams (rhythmic sequences), gestures, or Mukhaabhinaya (facial expression). Uthram Thirunal sought to synthesize the best elements of all three traditions within his Palace Troupe. This coalescence of styles, as noted by Kottarathil Sankunni in Aithihyamala, won widespread appreciation from Kathakali connoisseurs across Kerala.

=== Repertoire and style ===
Easwara Pillai became a highly proficient all-rounder (Aadyavasaana Vaesham), performing all major Kathakali role types except Kari and Thadi. He was particularly acclaimed for his portrayals in the Pacha (green — noble characters), Kathi (knife — anti-heroes), and Minukku (polished — refined characters) categories.

His most celebrated roles included:

- Nala in Nala Charitham
- Keechaka
- Cheriya Narakasura
- Ravana in Bali Vijayam and Karthaveeryaarjuna Vijayam
- Sundara Brahmanan in Nala Charitam and Rukmini Swayamvaram

He was equally renowned for performing slow padams (lyrical passages) requiring consummate acting finesse and elaborate Ilakiyattams (extended dance sequences without lyrics depicting episodes in detail), including Swargavarnana (Description of Heaven) and Kailasoddhaaranam (Lifting of Mount Kailasa).

Under the Maharaja's guidance, Easwara Pillai gave pre-eminence to Aadyavasana Kathi Vaeshams in performances, which became a hallmark of the southern school (Thekkan Chitta) of Kathakali. The major Kathi roles of Duryodhana in Irayimman Thampi's Uttaraaswayamvaram and Ravana in Kilimanoor Rajaraja Varma Koithampuran's Ravana Vijayam became especially prized by connoisseurs.

=== Notable contemporaries ===
Other actors in the Valia Kottaaram Kathakali Yogam included Kavalam Kochu Narayana Panikkar, Thakazhi Velu Pillai, Nalan Unni, Kurichi Krishna Pillai, Kandiyoor Pappu Pillai, Pazhavangaadi Nanu Pillai (noted for female roles), and Thaadi Kittunni (noted for Chuvanna Thadi roles). Easwara Pillai was regarded as pre-eminent among all of them, as well as among leading Kathakali actors elsewhere in Kerala.

=== Patronage and accoutrements ===
The Maharaja had special crowns (headgear) and other adornments, trinkets, and vestments made exclusively for Easwara Pillai, some in pure gold studded with precious gems. Pillai reportedly never wore any vestments or ornaments other than those specially made for him, and seldom mingled with other Kathakali actors offstage.

=== Post-Palace career ===
When Maharaja Ayilyam Thirunal succeeded Uthram Thirunal and disbanded the Palace Kathakali Yogam, Easwara Pillai briefly joined Maadathaanni Kunchu Kurup's troupe as an all-rounder for about a year before largely retiring from regular performance. He continued to perform on special occasions at the invitation of nobles and close associates.

The south Malabar writer Perumpilavil Theyyunni Menon recalled seeing Easwara Pillai perform in 1869 CE at Olappamanna Mana in south Malabar, describing him as a tall, hefty person with a magnificent bearing who wore the Thiruvananthapuram-style Katti and Kavani, expensive diamond rings, and travelled in a Doli (palanquin) with four attendants and a pet fawn with a bell around its neck.

== Famous anecdotes ==
Several well-known anecdotes illustrate Easwara Pillai's exceptional versatility and his ability to dominate performances even in minor roles, typically arising from the jealousy of co-actors who complained to the Maharaja about his always being assigned the lead.

=== Kailasoddhaaranam as Narada ===
When co-actors complained about Easwara Pillai always performing the role of Ravana in Bali Vijayam, the Maharaja assigned him the lesser role of Maharshi Narada instead. During the performance, when Narada was supposed to ask Ravana how he obtained the divine sword Chandrahaasam from Lord Siva, Easwara Pillai as Narada indicated through gestures that he already knew the answer and proceeded to delineate the entire Kailasoddhaaranam episode himself in elaborate detail, leaving the actor playing Ravana stupefied. The incident reportedly silenced the complainants.

=== Vidyujjihwan's grand procession ===
Assigned the minor role of Vidyujjihwan (fiancé of Soorpanakha) in Raavanodbhavam, Easwara Pillai arranged an elaborate wedding procession with soldiers, a musical band, Panchavadyam, Nadaswaram, torches, and fireworks. The entire audience left the main stage — where the actor playing Ravana was performing an elaborate padam — to watch Vidyujjihwan's spectacular arrival. The display was dramatically appropriate for a royal bridegroom, yet it left the Ravana actor performing to an empty audience.

=== Arjuna in Santhaanagopaalam ===
In a staging of Santhaanagopaalam, the actor Ampalapuzha Narayana Panikkar, performing the Brahmin role, used his Ilakiyattam to mock Arjuna (played by Easwara Pillai), taunting him about his arrogance. Easwara Pillai did not respond at the time but in the final scene, after Arjuna restores the Brahmin's ten dead sons to life, he delivered an Ilakiyattam attributing all credit to "this Swami" — gesturing towards Lord Krishna on stage while turning his gaze towards the Maharaja in the audience — and advising the Brahmin that his misfortunes stemmed from a lack of devotion. The audience remarked that Panikkar had received a rebuff "with double interest."

=== Maathali at Vadakkunnatha Temple ===
While visiting Thrissur during a pilgrimage to Guruvayur, Easwara Pillai was invited to perform before the Maharaja of Cochin at the Vadakkunnathan Temple. Local actors assigned him the minor role of Maathali (Lord Indra's charioteer) in Kaalakaeya Vadham. Distressed, Easwara Pillai sought guidance from the Sanskrit scholar Kunjikkaavu Nampoothiripad, who pointed out that while occupants of Indra's throne changed across Yugas, the charioteer Maathali remained constant — implying that Maathali knew Swargam (Heaven) more intimately than any Indra. Inspired, Easwara Pillai performed an extraordinarily detailed Swargavarnana as Maathali, leaving the actor playing Arjuna at a loss. The Nampoothiripad, witnessing the performance, was so moved that he ascended the stage and presented his own shoulder cloth (thorthu) to Easwara Pillai, who reportedly treasured it for the rest of his life.

== Kerala Vilasam Press and media contributions ==
In 1853 CE (1028 M.E.), with the encouragement and financial support of Maharaja Uthram Thirunal, Easwara Pillai established the Kerala Vilasam Achhukkoodam (Kerala Vilasam Press) within the Fort at Thiruvananthapuram. It was among the first printing presses in Kerala established by a private citizen, as earlier presses had been set up by Christian missionaries such as Hermann Gundert or by the State Government.

Major publications from the press included:

- Anthologies of Keertanams of Maharaja Swati Thirunal and Irayimman Thampi (1853 CE)
- Adhyatma Ramayanam and Nalacharitam in the Kilippattu genre (1853 CE)
- The first compiled anthology of 54 Attakathas (Kathakali plays) (1858 CE), considered a landmark contribution to both literature and Kathakali

The press thrived until approximately 1890 CE. Mahakavi Ulloor Parameswara Aiyer, in Volume IV of Kerala Sahitya Charitram, states that Vidya Vilasini, described as the first literary magazine in Malayalam, was published from this press beginning in March–April 1881 CE, carrying informative and scientific articles and poems including contributions by Maharaja Vishakham Thirunal and Kerala Varma Valia Koithampuran. However, this attribution has been contested by Puthuppalli Raghavan in Kerala Patra-pravartana Charitram and G. Priyadarsanan in Malayala Patrapravarthanam — Praarambhaswaroopam, who argue with supporting evidence that Vidya Vilasini was published by a different press called Keralodayam.

Easwara Pillai's pioneering contributions to the print media have been noted in most media and literary histories of Kerala.

== Palace appointments and honours ==
In 1849 CE (1024 M.E.), Maharaja Uthram Thirunal appointed Easwara Pillai, then aged 34, as Palliyara Vicharippukar (Bedroom Manager) of the royal household and as the head (Aasaan) of the Valia Kottaaram Kathakali Yogam. The Maharaja also:

- Built the Punnackal House for Easwara Pillai in the Palace precincts within the Fort, located opposite the western gate of the Padmanabhaswamy Temple on a lane now known as Punnackal Road
- Provided tax-free landed properties in Thiruvananthapuram, Neyyattinkara, Nadayara near Varkala, and Vaikom

Easwara Pillai is also recorded as having thatched the roof of the Amkode Mahadeva Temple with copper sheets in place of tiles, an act commemorated by a Tamil inscription in the temple.

== Personal life ==
=== Marriages ===
Easwara Pillai married four times:

1. First wife — from Thiruvananthapuram. They had two sons and two daughters. The elder son, Velayudhan (alias Kochu Velu Pillai), trained in Kathakali before entering government service as a Shirastadar and was later appointed Mint Superintendent during the reign of Maharaja Sree Moolam Thirunal. The elder daughter, Gourikkutty, was briefly married to Pazhavangadi Nanu Pillai, a fellow actor in the Palace Troupe, at the Maharaja's suggestion. When Easwara Pillai expressed his displeasure with the match — reportedly through his performance as Daksha in Daksha Yagam, directing the relevant padam about giving one's daughter to an unworthy person towards the Maharaja — the alliance was dissolved and Gourikkutty returned to Punnackal House.
2. Second wife — reportedly from Thrissur.
3. Third wife — Kalyanikkutty (born 1839 CE), second daughter of Cheruparampath Kunjukrishna Menon, the Sarvaadhikaariakkaar (Chief Administrator) of the Maharaja of Cochin. She came from the Mathirappali family of Cheranalloor in the Kingdom of Cochin. After living with Easwara Pillai in Punnackal House, she was given in marriage to Maharaja Ayilyam Thirunal Rama Varma of Travancore in 1863 CE, becoming his consort with the title Ammachi and later being adopted into the Nagerkovil Ammaveedu under the name Kalyanikkutty Thankachi. She was a poet and authored several literary works in Malayalam.
4. Fourth wife — from the Jagathy Maelay Veedu in Thiruvananthapuram.

=== Family and Punnackal House ===
Easwara Pillai's matrilineal joint family, including his maternal aunt and maternal cousin Kaliyamma Pillai Narayani Pillai and her descendants, came to reside in Punnackal House. His grand-nephew, Aiyappan Pillai Raman Pillai (alias Punnackal A.R. Pillai; 1879–1938), was a notable figure who married Gouri Amma, the eldest daughter of the celebrated novelist C. V. Raman Pillai, in 1905 CE.

== Legacy ==
Kathakali connoisseurs across Kerala have acknowledged Easwara Pillai as one of the greatest Kathakali artists in the history of the art form. His synthesis of multiple Kathakali traditions under royal patronage contributed significantly to the development of the southern school (Thekkan Chitta) of Kathakali. His establishment of the Kerala Vilasam Press and his publication of the first anthology of Attakathas are regarded as landmark contributions to both Malayalam literature and the preservation of Kathakali as a literary and performing art.

== Bibliography ==
- Ulloor Parameswara Aiyer. Kerala Sahitya Charitram. Vol. IV.
- K.P.S. Menon. Kathakali Rangam.
- Kottarathil Sankunni (April 1974). Aithihyamaala. Vol. II. Kottayam: Kottarathil Sankunni Memorial Committee.
- Aymanam Krishna Kaimal. Aattakkathaasaahityam. State Institute of Languages (Kerala Bhasha Institute).
- V.S. Sarma. Thiruvithamkoor Rajavamsam.
- Thandava Kathakali Theatre Souvenir, 1989–90, Thiruvananthapuram
