= Jnanendra Das Gupta =

Indian chemist (1888–?)

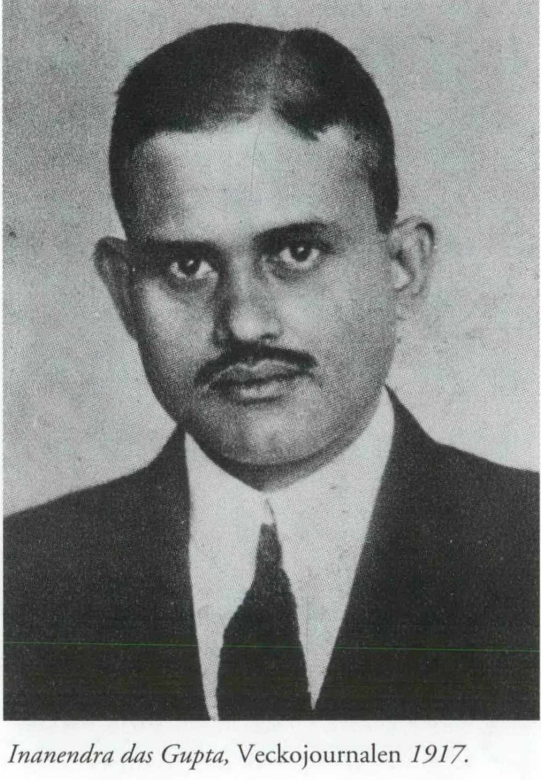
In 1917

Jnanendra Chandra Das Gupta (German form: Inanendra) (1888 – ?) was an Indian-born chemist who developed a thermosetting plastic called Indolack while working in the Swedish company Perstorp. This led to the development of the first plastic called "isolit" used in Sweden.

Das Gupta was born in India. He studied pharmaceutical chemistry under Fritz Ullmann (1875-1939) at the Technische Universität Berlin and received a doctorate for his thesis titled "Studien über 2-Chloranthrachinon-3-carbonsäure". His study in Germany was sponsored in 1911 by the National Council of Education Bengal and the Indian Association (through donations from Taraknath Palit) for the Cultivation of Science. He worked for a while as a chemist at Hoffmann La Roche in Basel and in 1914, he was among the earliest members of the German Friends of India or Berlin Committee, a revolutionary group begun by Virendranath "Chatto" Chattopadhyaya and supported by the German Foreign Office where Das Gupta had a friend in the Sinologist Herbert Mueller (1885-1966) (who allegedly later worked for ComIntern). Gupta later worked for the Indian National Army. Sometime later he moved from Switzerland and began to work in Sweden at Skånska Ättikfabriken AB (which later became Perstorp AB) founded by Wilhelm Wendt in Skåne 1881. In 1918 he developed Indolack based on the formula for bakelite, which he knew about, using formalin and cresol which led to the development of the first thermosetting plastic "Isolit" in Sweden. Indolack was a substitute for shellac and Isolit for solid thermoset plastic products. Das Gupta left Sweden in 1919, having been denied citizenship in the country.
