= Vishwanath Datta =

Bengali writer and lawyer

Biswanath Datta
- Born: 1835; Calcutta, Bengal, British India
- Died: 23 February 1884 (aged 48–49); Calcutta, Bengal, British India
- Spouse: Bhubaneswari Devi (m.1851)
- Children: 6 including Narendranath & Bupendranath
- Parent(s): Durgaprasad Dutta (father); Syamasundari Devi (mother)
- Writing career
- Language: Bengali
- Subjects: Attorney-at-law, novelist

Biswanath Datta (1835 — 23 February 1884) was a Bengali lawyer, philanthropist and novelist. He was the father of Swami Vivekananda, Mahendranath Dutta and Bhupendranath Dutta.

== Early life ==
Vishwanath was born to an aristocratic Hindu family of North Calcutta. His father Durgaprasad Dutta (1816—1850/55) had preferred the life of Sannyas and left home when Vishwanath was only six years old. His mother Shyamasundari Devi was an educated woman. She wrote a Bengali poetical work “Gangabhakti Tarangaini” (Bengali: গঙ্গাভক্তি তরঙ্গিনী). Durgaprasad and Shyamasundari had two children - a daughter, who died at a young age, and then a son, Vishwanath. Shyamasundari died of cholera in 1847. At the time of his mother's death, Vishwanath was only 12 years old. The now orphaned Vishwanath was brought up by his uncle Kaliprasad Datta and his wife Vishweshwari Devi.

It so happened that in somewhere between 1845 and 1846, Durgaprasad returned to Calcutta. He was recognised by one of his neighbours who locked him in a small room in his house so that he cannot escape and remain in a desperate condition as a sannyasi. He was locked in this room for 3 days. At last, on the third day the neighbour's wife Sarita Devi took pity on him and helped him escape from the house. He entered in Gourmohan Addy's school or Oriental Seminary. After completion of graduation, in 1859, Datta worked as a clerk under an attorney, Charles Peter.

== Career ==
Datta was an enlightened person of the 19th century, free from religious superstitions, known for his charity and liberal outlook. He was well versed in Sanskrit, Hindi, Persian, Arabic and Urdu languages.

He married Bhuvaneswari Devi (1841 — 25 July, 1911), daughter of Nandalal Bose and Raghumani Devi, in 1851 and had nine children. Among them, 4 daughters and 3 sons survived - Haramoni, Swarnamoyee, Kiranbala, Jogindrabala, Narendranath, Mahendranath and Bhupendranath. Narendranath Dutta, his fifth child and first son, who later became famous as Swami Vivekananda, was born in 1863.

In 1866 he applied for the post of proctor to Barnes Peacock, the first Chief Justice of Calcutta High Court. His prayer was approved by Justice Walter Morgan (judge). Datta also maintained a law firm in Kolkata named Dhar & Datta. Later he faced serious economic troubles for frequent litigation and lawsuits among Datta family.

== Literary works ==
Datta wrote a Bengali autobiographical novel named Sulochana based on a joint family dispute. In 1882 the novel was first published in Kolkata (then "Calcutta").

== Death ==
Vishwanath Datta was working as a successful lawyer when he died on the night of Saturday, 23 February 1884 at the age of 49. He was suffering from diabetes and heart ailments.

After his death, the responsibility of the family fell on his son Narendranath, who found solace in the company of Ramakrishna Paramhansa, eventually becoming his disciple assuming the name Swami Vivekananda.
