= Rosscote Krishna Pillai =

Indian science writer (1927–2020)

- Born: Krishna Pillai; 26 June 1927; Thiruvananthapuram, Travancore
- Died: 20 October 2020 (aged 93); Sasthamangalam, Thiruvananthapuram
- Occupations: Science writer, news reader
- Years active: 1950–2020
- Spouse: K. R. Hemakumari
- Parent(s): A. R. Pillai; B. Gourikkutty Amma
- Relatives: C. V. Raman Pillai (maternal grandfather)

Rosscote Krishna Pillai (26 June 1927 – 20 October 2020) was an Indian science writer and news reader with All India Radio from Kerala. He was the maternal grandson of C. V. Raman Pillai, a pioneering Malayalam novelist and dramatist.

== Early life ==
Rosscote Krishna Pillai was born on 26 June 1927 in Thiruvananthapuram, then part of the kingdom of Travancore. His father, Padinjarekotta Punnaykkal Veettil Ayyappan Pillai Raman Pillai, popularly known as A. R. Pillai, was an Indian expatriate, journalist, writer, and book publisher based in Göttingen, Germany, who was active in the Indian independence movement. His mother, B. Gouri Amma, was the eldest daughter of C. V. Raman Pillai, the first historical novelist in Malayalam and author of Marthanda Varma, Dharmaraja, Premamritham, and Ramarajabahadur.

Born R. Krishna Pillai, he adopted the name "Rosscote" after the family house built by C. V. Raman Pillai. The house was named in honour of C. V.'s guru, John Ross, a Scotsman who served as the first principal of His Highness The Maharaja's College (now University College) in Thiruvananthapuram. After completing school, he joined H. H. Maharaja's College and obtained an M.Sc. degree in chemistry.

== Career ==
Pillai entered the Indian Information Service and served in various media units under the Ministry of Information and Broadcasting, Government of India. He was then sent on deputation as News Editor in the Regional Language Division of All India Radio Delhi where he was assigned the Malayalam News Bulletin.

He was the founding editor of the Malayalam edition of Yojana, a publication of the Publications Division of India, Government of India, which had previously been available only in English and Hindi. He retired as Deputy Principal Information Officer at the Press Information Bureau in Thiruvananthapuram, and served as a member of the Executive Committee of the Kerala Sahitya Akademi.

== Literary works ==
Pillai compiled an English–Malayalam science dictionary that introduced accurate Malayalam translations of scientific terminology. His other major works include:

- An Illustrated Encyclopedia for Children
- Dictionary of C. V. Raman Pillai's Works
- A Collection of Essays on Lunar Mission
- A Book on Birdwatching
- Wadamalli: Scientific Scripts
- Discoveries that Changed the Face of the World (translation)

He was also instrumental in establishing the C. V. Raman Pillai Memorial Foundation.

== Honours ==
He was the recipient of a Harvard University fellowship.
