= C. V. Raman Pillai =

Indian novelist and playwright

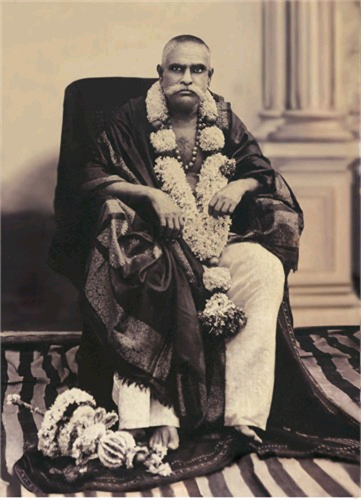
- Born: Cannankara Velayudhan Raman Pillai; 19 May 1858; Arayoor, Travancore (present-day Trivandrum, Kerala)
- Died: 21 March 1922 (aged 63); Trivandrum, Travancore
- Education: His Highness Maharaja's College, Travancore; University of Madras
- Occupations: Novelist, playwright, journalist, social activist, sheristadar
- Spouses: Bhageerathi Amma (m. 1887; died 1904); Janaki Amma (m. 1905–1922)
- Children: Gowrikutty; Maheshwari Amma
- Parent(s): Panavilakath Neelakanta Pillai (father); Parvathy Pillai (mother)
- Relatives: A. R. Pillai (son-in-law; married Gowrikutty); E. V. Krishna Pillai (son-in-law; married Maheshwari Amma); Rosscote Krishna Pillai (grandson; son of Gowrikutty); Adoor Bhasi (grandson; son of Maheshwari Amma)
- Writing career
- Period: 1880s −1920s
- Genres: Fiction, theatre
- Subjects: Literary, socio-cultural
- Notable works: Marthandavarma; Dharmaraja; Ramarajabahadur; Premamritham

Cannankara Velayudhan Raman Pillai (19 May 1858 – 21 March 1922), also known as C. V., was a major Indian novelist and playwright and a pioneering playwright and novelist of Malayalam literature. He was known for his historical novels such as Marthandavarma, Dharmaraja and Ramaraja Bahadur, the last being considered one of the greatest novels written in Malayalam.

== Biography ==
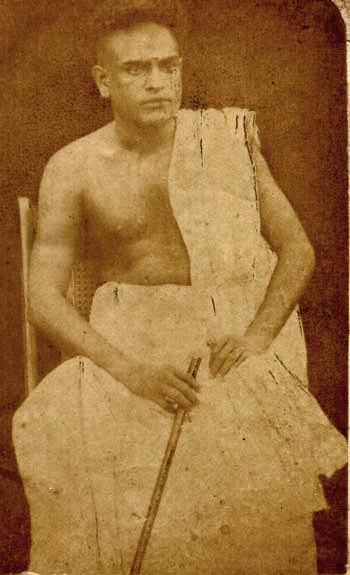
CV as a young man

Born in Thiruvananthapuram (Trivandrum), capital city of the erstwhile native State of Travancore, on 19 May 1858 to Panavilakath Neelakanta Pillai, a Sanskrit scholar and Parvathy Pillai, a scion of an ancient matrilineal family; both his parents were from middle-class families and employees at the Palace of the Maharaja of Travancore. Pillai got his family name, Cannankara, through matrilineal succession. Fondly called Ramu, he had a traditional Sanskritized education, early in life, under his father's tutelage which included lessons in Ayurveda and even magic and Tantra. He continued education at the first English school in Thiruvananthapuram. Subsequently, he graduated from His Highness Maharaja's College (the present-day University College Thiruvananthapuram), the first-ever College in Travancore, where he reportedly had a brilliant academic career under John Ross, the principal of the institution and Robert Harvey, and obtained his BA degree from the Madras University in 1881, securing a second class, ranking seventh in the Madras Presidency and second in Thiruvananthapuram College. It was during this period, he started his first periodical named The Kerala Patriot.

After graduation, Pillai suffered from persistent stomach ailments and chest pain, aggravated by the disruptions of continuous study and travel. He tried various treatments in Thiruvananthapuram without success before travelling to Patthanamthitta, where he stayed with his elder brother Narayana Pillai, a Tehsildar, and later with another brother Sankara Pillai in Paravur, Kollam. Approximately one and a half years were spent in such travels and recuperation, during which time his health gradually improved and he devoted himself to reading.

After this period, Pillai studied law but dropped out and went to Madras to study for the government pleader examination which he also abandoned in due course. Later, he joined the High Court as a clerk and rose to the position of a shirasthadar. Later, he joined the Government Press and held the position of a superintendent when he retired from service. In between, he founded three publications, Malayali in 1886, Vanchiraj in 1901 and Mitabhashi in 1920. While editing The Kerala Patriot, his series of articles criticising the ill effects of the Viruthi system attracted the attention of Divan Rama Iyengar.

=== First marriage and travels ===
Pillai's first marriage was arranged by his brothers against his wishes. He held romantic ideals about marriage, shaped by the novels and Indian stories he had read, and was reluctant to wed a woman he had never known. The marriage was short-lived; his wife left for Thiruvananthapuram during his absence, and Pillai never sought her return. He later drew on these experiences in his unfinished autobiographical novel Premarishtam.

Following this period, Pillai disappeared from Thiruvananthapuram for some time and undertook an extended journey to Hyderabad and Mysore, visiting historic sites associated with Hyder Ali and Tipu Sultan. The journey had a profound influence on his imagination and later literary works. In Hyderabad, he befriended local Muslim notables who held him in high regard, especially for his musical abilities, and even urged him to convert to Islam and settle there. He was eventually persuaded to return home by a merchant from Thiruvananthapuram whom he chanced to meet. Pillai later described the episode as "a miraculous escape from an otherwise disastrous perversion."

=== Second and third marriages ===
He married again in 1887, at the age of 30. His second wife, Bhageerathi Amma of the Keezheveedu family, was only 16 at the time of the wedding. The match had been proposed by his close friend and colleague Narasimham Pillai. The marriage lasted till Bhageerathi Amma's untimely death in 1904. The couple had at least two daughters: Gowrikutty and Maheshwari Amma. In August 1904, Gowrikutty, then sixteen, was married to A. R. Pillai, a prominent merchant of Thiruvananthapuram, in a ceremony attended by the Diwan and other notables. Their son was the journalist Rosscote Krishna Pillai. Maheshwari Amma, the youngest daughter, later married playwright E. V. Krishna Pillai; their son was the actor Adoor Bhasi. His third marriage was to Janaki Amma, the elder sister of Bhageerathi Amma and the widow of C. Raja Raja Varma, the younger brother of Raja Ravi Varma. He died on 21 March 1922, at the age of 63, survived by Janaki Amma.

== Writing career ==
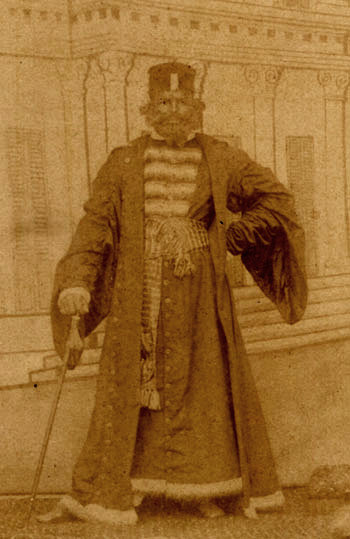
CV as Edgar in King Lear

Raman Pillai is compared by many with Bankim Chandra Chatterjee in Bengali and Hari Narayan Apte in Marathi, two other greats of India literature. His first published book was Chandramukhivilasam, a satire. He wrote his first novel, Marthandavarma, in 1885 but it was published in 1891. This followed such historical novels as Dharmaraja and Ramarajabahadur, the social novel, Premamritam as well as several farces. Modern Malayalam drama traces its origins to his works. He is credited with the first original play in Malayalam, Chandramukheevilasam, written in 1884 and was staged for four days successively in 1887 at His Highness Maharaja's College, Trivandrum.

== Role in the Malayalee Memorial ==
Pillai played a significant but largely behind-the-scenes role in the Malayali Memorial of 1891, a landmark event in the political history of Travancore. The Memorial was a petition protesting the dominance of non-Malayalee Maharashtrian Brahmin officials in the Travancore civil service under Divan Rama Rao, pointing out that while numerous foreign officials drew high salaries, not a single Malayalee drew a salary above Rs. 500. The Memorial also raised the issue of caste-based exclusion in education and government service, noting that there was not a single member of the Ezhava community in government service earning five rupees or more per month.

It was Pillai who, while staying in Madras for his law examinations in 1889, first brought the matter to the attention of K. P. Sankara Menon and G. P. Pillai, two figures who would become publicly associated with the movement. As a government official, Pillai's name could not be publicised, but he was instrumental in drafting the Memorial itself, mobilising support in the capital, and coordinating the signature campaign that gathered 10,037 signatories. When funds ran short for the travel and campaign expenses of Sankara Menon and G. P. Pillai, Pillai sold his wife's necklaces to raise Rs. 700. He also used his influence in northern Travancore to include Advocate Nidhiri in the deputation after another member, Mani Katthanar, withdrew under pressure from the authorities.

The Memorial was submitted before the Maharaja on 1 January 1891 by Sankara Menon. It received widespread support from major Indian newspapers. Though a counter-Memorial was submitted in response, the Maharaja gave an assurance that the grievances would be addressed. Divan Rama Rao soon retired, and his successor Sankara Subbayar, a native, adopted more equitable policies.

== Exegetic dictionary ==
C. V. Vyaakhyaana Kosham is a 400-plus page lexicographic work in four volumes, based on Pillai's books. The work includes the explanations, elucidations and interpretations of over 700,000 Malayalam, Sanskrit, Tamil, Hindustani and English words used by him in his writings.

== Works ==
=== Novels ===
==== Historical novels ====
- Marthandavarma (1891)
- Dharmaraja (1913)
- Ramaraja Bahadur (1918–1919)

==== Social novels ====
- Premamritam (1915)

==== Uncategorized ====
- Dishtadamshtram (1922) (unfinished)
- Premarishtam (1922) (unfinished)

=== Plays ===
- Chandramukheevilāsam (1884) (not published)
- Mattavilāsam (1885) (not published)
- Kurupillakalari (1909)
- Tentanāmkōţţu Harischandran (1914)
- Kaimalassanţe Kadassikkai (1915)
- Docţarku Kiţţiya Micham (1916)
- Cherutēn Columbus (1917)
- Pandathē Pāchan (1918)
- Pãpi Chelluņadam Pāthālam (1919)
- Kuruppinţe Thirippu (1920)
- Butler Pappan (1922)

=== Other works ===
- Videsiyamedhavitvam (1922) (a collection of editorials)

=== As editor in newspapers ===
- The Kerala Patriot (1882)
- Malayali (1886)
- Vanchiraj (1901)
- Mitabhashi (1920)

=== Translations ===
- Marthandavarma (1936, 1979)
- Dharmaraja (2009)
- Ramaraja Bahadur (2003)

== Honours ==
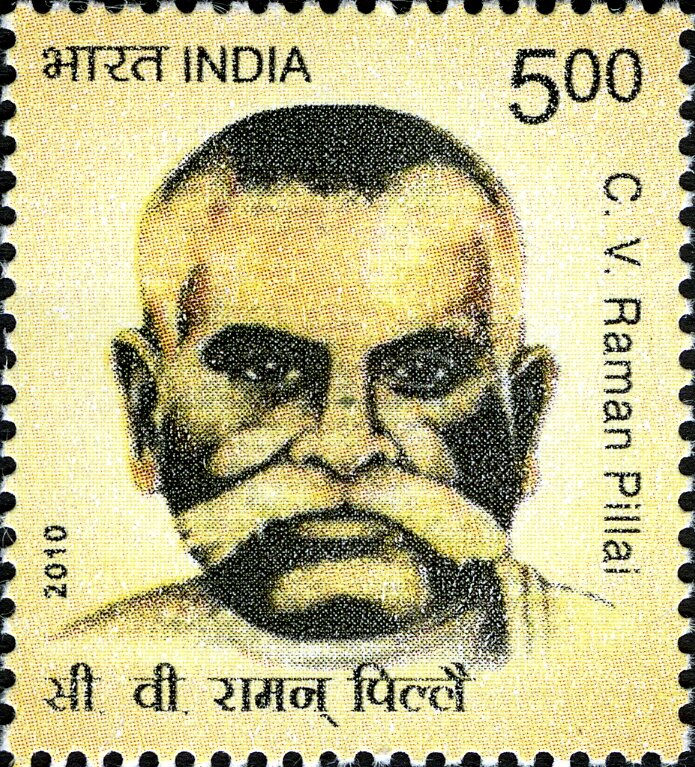
Stamp of India 2010 C V Raman Pillai

The India Post issued a commemorative postage stamp on Pillai on 19 May 2010. A road in Vazhuthacaud, Thiruvananthapuram has been named after him as C. V. Raman Pillai Road. Chenkal, a panchayat in Thiruvananthapuram which includes his native village of Arayoor, was renamed as C.V.R. Puram in 1970.

== Writings on Raman Pillai ==
- S. Guptan Nair (1992). C.V. Raman Pillai. Sahitya Akademi. ISBN 978-81-7201-273-1.
- P.K. Parameswaran Nair, C. S. Venkiteswaran (2004). "C. V. Raman Pillai". Indian Literature. 48 (1): 125–136. JSTOR 23341432.
- Meena T. Pillai (July 2012). "Modernity and the Fetishizing of Female Chastity: C.V. Raman Pillai and the Anxieties of the Early Malayalam Novel". South Asian Review. 33: 53–75. doi:10.1080/02759527.2012.11932863. S2CID 191905321.
- Kurup, C. Sreekanta (July 2003). Ākhyānasankētaṅṅaḷ: Si.Vi.yuṭe Caritranōvalukaḷil ആഖ്യാനസങ്കേതങ്ങൾ: സി.വി.യുടെ ചരിത്രനോവലുകളിൽ [Narrative techniques in the historical novels of C V Raman Pillai] (Ph.D.) (in Malayalam). Shodhganga: University of Kerala. hdl:10603/147674.
- Vēṇugōpan Nāir, S. V.; C.V. Raman Pillai National Foundation (1995). Vātsalyarasaṃ C. V. Yude Akhyāyikakaḷil. C.V. Raman Pillai National Foundation; Distributors, Kar̲an̲t Buks. OCLC 36315647.
- K. Ayyappa Paniker, History of Malayalam Literature (C. V. Raman Pillai - Chapter 34)
- N. Balakrishnan Nair, Saakshaal C. V.
- എൻ. കൃഷ്ണപ്പിള്ള; പ്രതിപാത്രം ഭാഷണഭേദം: ഡി.സി.ബുക്സ്, കോട്ടയം

== See also ==
- Kappazhom Raman Pillai
- Thunchath Ezhuthachan Malayalam University

=== Other social reformers of Kerala ===
- Sree Narayana Guru
- Dr. Palpu
- Kumaranasan
- Rao Sahib Dr. Ayyathan Gopalan
- Brahmananda Swami Sivayogi
- Vaghbhatananda
- Mithavaadi Krishnan
- Moorkoth Kumaran
- Ayyankali
- Ayya Vaikundar
- Pandit Karuppan
