= Virendranath Chattopadhyaya =

Indian revolutionary (1880–1937)

Virendranath Chattopadhyay
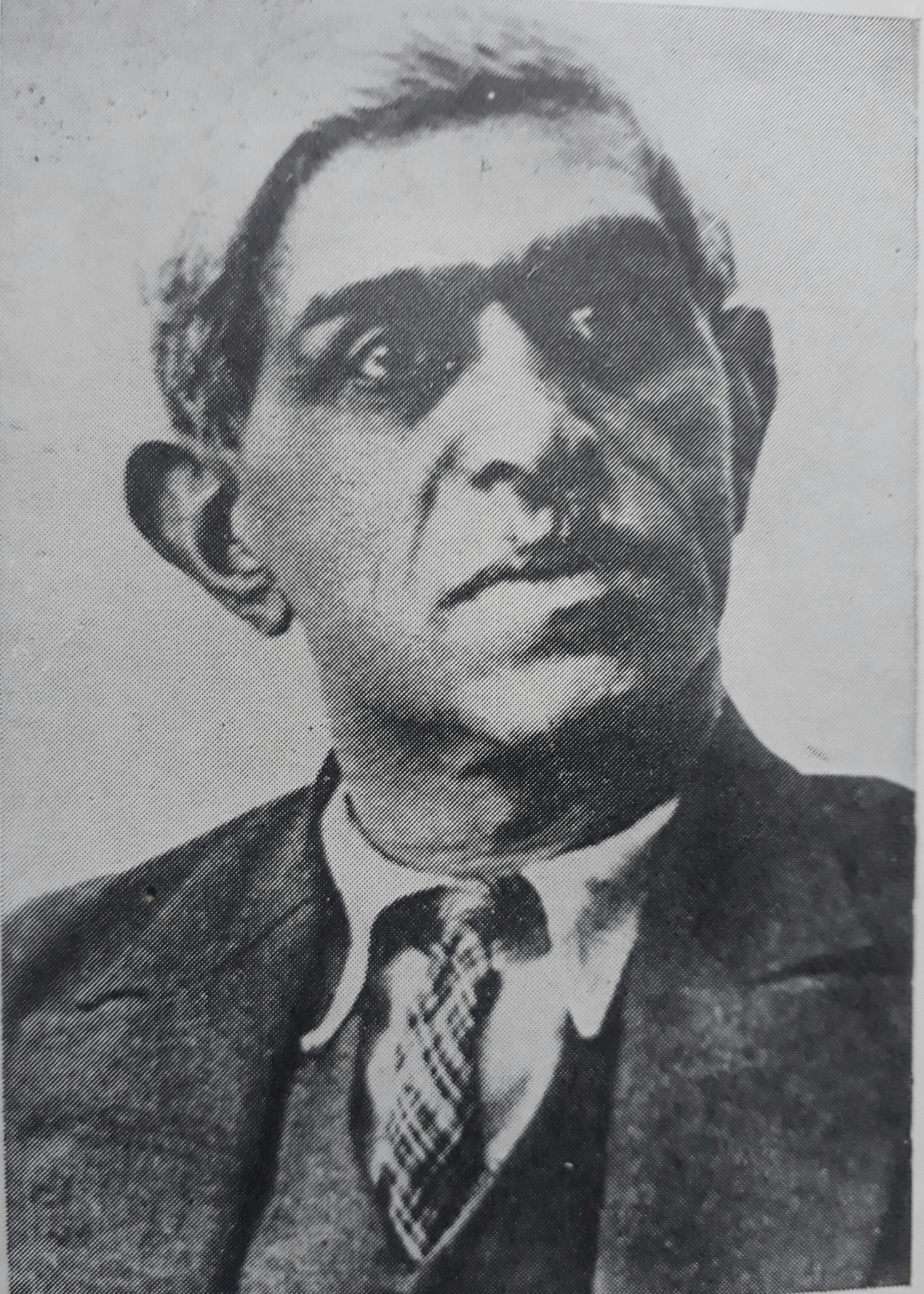
- Born: 31 October 1880; Hyderabad, Hyderabad State, British India
- Died: 2 September 1937 (aged 56) (presumed); Believed to be in the Soviet Union
- Other name: Chatto
- Organization(s): Jugantar, India House, Berlin Committee, League against Imperialism
- Movement: Indian independence movement, Hindu–German Conspiracy, Anti-imperialism
- Spouse: Liz Reynolds
- Partner: Agnes Smedley
- Relatives: Sarojini Naidu (sister), Harindranath Chattopadhyay (brother)

Virendranath Chattopadhyaya (31 October 1880 – 2 September 1937), also known by his pseudonym Chatto, was a prominent Indian revolutionary who worked to overthrow the British Raj in India using armed force. He created alliances with the Germans during World War I, was part of the Berlin Committee organising Indian students in Europe against the British, and explored actions by the Japanese at the time.

He went to Moscow in 1920 to develop support by the communists for the Indian movement, including among Asians in Moscow who were working on revolutionary movements. He joined the Communist Party of Germany (KPD). He lived in Moscow for several years in the 1930s. Arrested in July 1937 in the Great Purge, Chatto was executed on 2 September 1937. He was the brother of prominent political activist and poet Sarojini Naidu.

== Early life ==
His childhood nickname was Binnie or Biren. Virendranath was the eldest son (the second of eight children) of Dr. Aghorenath Chattopadhyay, a scientist-philosopher and educationist who was an ex-principal and professor of science at the Nizam College, and his wife Barada Sundari Devi, a poet and singer in a Bengali Brahmin family settled in Hyderabad. Their children Sarojini Naidu and Harindranath Chattopadhyay became well-known poets and parliamentarians. Their daughter Mrinalini (Gannu) became a nationalist activist and introduced Virendranath to many of her circle in Calcutta. A younger son Marin became involved with Virendranath in political activism.

Chattopadhyaya received a secular and liberal education. He was a polyglot and was fluent in the Indian languages Telugu, Tamil, Bengali, Urdu, Persian, Hindi, as well as English; later he was to learn French, Italian, German, Dutch, Russian, and the Scandinavian languages as well. He matriculated in the University of Madras and received an undergraduate degree in arts from the University of Calcutta. In Calcutta, through his sister Gannu (Mrinalini), already known as an advanced Nationalist, Virendranath was introduced to Bejoy Chandra Chatterjee, a barrister and extremist. Chatto met Sri Aurobindo's family, especially his cousins, Kumudini and Sukumar Mitra; the former was editor of the seditious magazine Suprabhat. For years afterwards, Chattopadhyaya maintained contact with all of them.

== In England ==
In 1902, Chattopadhyaya joined the University of Oxford, while preparing for the Indian Civil Service. Later, he became a law student of the Middle Temple. While frequenting Shyamji Krishna Varma's India House at 65 Cromwell Avenue in London, Chattopadhyaya became closely acquainted with V. D. Savarkar (since 1906). In 1907, Chattopadhyaya was on the editorial board of Shyamji's Indian Sociologist. In August, along with Madame Cama and S. R. Rana, he attended the Stuttgart Conference of the Second International where they met delegates including Henry Hyndman, Karl Liebknecht, Jean Jaurès, Rosa Luxemburg, and Ramsay MacDonald, among others. Vladimir Lenin attended, but it is not certain if Chattopadhyaya met him on this occasion.

In 1908, at "India House" he came in contact with a number of important "agitators" from India: G. S. Khaparde, Lajpat Rai, Har Dayal, Rambhuj Dutt and Bipin Chandra Pal. In June 1909, at an India House meeting, V. D. Savarkar strongly advocated assassinations of the Englishmen in India. On 1 July, at the Imperial Institute in London, Sir William Curzon-Wyllie, political aide-de-camp at the India Office, was assassinated by Madan Lal Dhingra, who was deeply influenced by Savarkar. Chattopadhyaya published a letter in The Times on 6 July in support of Savarkar, and was promptly expelled from the Middle Temple by the Benchers. In November 1909, he edited the short-lived but virulent nationalist periodical Talvar (The Sword).

In May 1910, seizing the opportunity of tension between the United Kingdom and Japan over the Korean peninsula, Chattopadhyaya discussed the possibility of Japanese help to Indian revolutionary efforts. On 9 June 1910, along with D. S. Madhavrao, he followed V. V. S. Aiyar to Paris, to avoid a warrant issued for his arrest. Upon reaching France, he joined the French Section of the Workers' International (SFIO).

== In Paris ==
Aiyar returned to India and settled in Pondicherry where he published the Dharma newspaper and a number of political pamphlets in Tamil, while maintaining a regular contact with Madame Cama in Paris. Chatto and some other revolutionaries stayed with her at 25 rue de Ponthieu and helped her to edit the Bande Mataram: its April 1911 issue "was one of the most violent that ever appeared," praising outrages in Nasik and Calcutta. It said: "With gentlemen we can be gentlemen, but not with rogues and scoundrels. (...) Our friends the Bengalis have also begun to understand. Blessed be their efforts. Long be their arms."

In connection with the Tinnevelly Conspiracy Case in February 1912, Madame Cama published an article showing that these political assassinations were in accord with the teachings of the Bhagavad Gita. In 1912, he had a brief relationship with Jane Morand, one of the main organizers of the Comité féminin, the most developed anarcha-feminist organization in France at the time. This relationship, during which he moved in with her for a while, did not last, however.

== Marriage and family ==
In 1912, Chattopadhyaya married Miss Reynolds, an Irish Catholic girl. Because he was not a Catholic, she brought a special dispensation from the pope to marry him. After the ceremony she informed him that a condition of the marriage was that any child was to be brought up Catholic. They quarreled and parted, she becoming a nun in some hidden English convent and he trying for years to have the marriage annulled. Chattopadhyaya went to Berlin in April 1914 to further revolutionary activities. There he entered a union with Agnes Smedley. Although it was not a legal marriage, she bore his name and was known as his wife. The relationship lasted eight years. Agnes wrote her famous novel Daughter of Earth in 1928, the year they got separated.

== In Germany ==
In Germany, to avoid suspicion, he enrolled in a university as a student. As a student in comparative linguistics at the University of Saxe-Anhalt in April 1914, Chattopadhyaya met Dr. Abhinash Bhattacharya (alias Bhatta) and some other nationalist Indian students. The former was well known to the influential members as belonging to the Kaiser's immediate circle. Early in September 1914, they formed a "German Friends of India" association, and were received by the brother of Wilhelm II. The Indians and Germans signed a treaty in favor of German help to oust the British from India. With the help of Baron Max von Oppenheim, who was an expert in Middle Eastern affairs in the German Foreign Office, Chattopadhyaya informed Indian students in thirty-one German universities about the association's future plans. He also helped in finding new members for the Berlin Committee.

Among its first members were Chattopadhyaya, Bhatta, Dr. Moreshwar Govindrao Prabhakar (Cologne), Dr Abdul Hafiz (Leipzig), C. Padmanabhan Pillai (Zürich), Dr. Jnanendra Das Gupta (Zürich), Dhiren Sarkar, Narain S. Marathé, Vishnu Suktankar, Gopal Paranjapé, Karandikar, Shrish Chandra Sen, Satish Chandra Ray, Sambhashiva Rao, Dadachanji Kersasp, Mansur Ahmad, Siddiq. Other prominent revolutionaries who soon found their way to Berlin were Har Dayal, Tarak Nath Das, Mohammad Barakatullah, Bhupendranath Datta, A. Raman Pilla (A. R. Pillai), Chandrakanta Chakravarti, M. P. T. Acharya, Herambalal Gupta, Jodh Singh Mahajan, Jiten Lahiri, Satyen Sen, and Vishnu Ganesh Pingley

On 22 September 1914, Sarkar and Marathé left for Washington, D.C., with a message for the German ambassador, Johann Heinrich von Bernstorff. He ordered Franz von Papen, his military attaché, to arrange for steamers, and purchase arms and ammunition, to be delivered on the eastern coast of India. On 20 November 1914, Chattopadhyaya sent Satyen Sen, V. G. Pingley, and Kartâr Singh to Calcutta with a report for Jatindranath Mukherjee or Bagha Jatin. Bagha Jatin sent a note through Pingley and Kartar Singh to Rash Behari Bose, asking him to expedite preparations for the proposed armed uprising. In 1915, Chattopadhyaya went to meet Mahendra Pratap in Switzerland and tell him of the Kaiser's personal invitation to meet. He was dogged by the British agent, Donald Gullick, and an attempt was made to kill Chattopadhyaya.

== Revolutionary vagabond ==
In 1917, With the failure of the Indo-German Zimmermann Plan, Chattopadhyaya opened a new Bureau of the Independence Committee in Stockholm, which acted under the name Indiska Nationalkommittéen. From this point on the Stockholm venture fought with the remaining parts of the Berlin Committee over the role of legitimate representative of Indian nationalism in Europe. In 1918, he contacted the Russian leaders Konstantin Troyanovsky and Angelica Balabanoff, the first general secretary of the Communist International (Comintern). In December, he dissolved the Berlin Committee. In May 1919, he arranged for a secret meeting of Indian revolutionaries in Berlin. In November 1920, in his search of financial and political support exclusively for the revolutionary nationalist movement in India, Chattopadhyaya was encouraged by M. N. Roy (with Mikhail Borodin's approval).

He went to Moscow with Agnes Smedley and they became companions, sharing their lives until 1928. Under her influence, Chattopadhyaya coveted the influential position Roy enjoyed in Moscow. The next year, he was received by Vladimir Lenin, along with Bhupendra Nath Datta and Pandurang Khankoje. From May to September, he attended the Indian Committee of the 3rd World Congress of the Communist International in Moscow. In December 1921, in Berlin, Chattopadhyaya founded an Indian News and Information Bureau with his correspondent Rash Behari Bose in Japan.

According to Sibnarayan Ray, Roy and Chattopadhyaya were rivals for Agnes: "Roy would have liked to work with him since he admired the latter's intelligence and energy. (...) By early 1926 Chatto had got into good terms with Roy."

At Roy's instance, Willi Münzenberg "took Chatto under his wings" in organising an international conference in Europe to inaugurate the League against Imperialism. On the eve of Roy's mission to China, in January 1927, Chatto wrote to Roy asking "if there is anything further you wish me to do..." On 26 August 1927, he wrote to Roy, after the latter's return to Moscow from China, asking to help him "directly" to gain admission to the Communist parties of India and Germany. After being advised by Roy, Chatto joined the Communist Party of Germany (KPD).

In 1927, while working as the head of the Indian Languages Section of the KPD, Chatto accompanied Jawaharlal Nehru to the Brussels Conference of the League against Imperialism. Chattopadhyaya served as its general secretary. His younger brother Harin went to Berlin that year to meet him and Agnes. On learning of Jawaharlal Nehru's becoming president of the Indian National Congress, Chattopadhyaya asked him – in vain – to split the party for a more revolutionary programme of full independence from British imperialism.

From 1930 to 1932, Chattopadhyaya published 28 articles in Inprecor, the Comintern organ, about an ultra-leftist sectarian turn of the Communist Party of India. Between 1931 and 1933, while living in Moscow, Chattopadhyaya continued to advocate anti-Hitler activities, Asian emancipation from Western powers, the independence of India, and Japanese intervention into the Chinese Communist Revolution. Among his Korean, Japanese, and Chinese friends was Zhou Enlai, the future Prime Minister of the People's Republic of China after its successful revolution.

Agnes saw him for the last time in 1933 and remembered later:

"He embodied the tragedy of a whole race. Had he been born in England or America, I thought, his ability would have placed him among the great leaders of his age... He was at last growing old, his body thin and frail, his hair rapidly turning white. The desire to return to India obsessed him, but the British would trust him only if he were dust on a funeral pyre."

== Last years ==
In January–February 1934, Chatto exchanged letters with Nadezhda Krupskaya (Lenin's widow). On 18 March 1934 he gave a talk about his reminiscences of Vladimir Lenin. He wrote to Georgi Dimitrov, the Comintern's general secretary, on 9 September 1935: "For three years I have been kept away from active work in the Comintern." Clemens Palme Dutt (the brother of R. Palme Dutt), mentioned having seen Chatto for the last time in 1936/37 at the department of ethnography of the Academy of Science in Leningrad.

Chattopadhyaya was arrested on 15 July 1937 during the Great Purge of Joseph Stalin. His name appeared on a death list among 184 other persons, which was signed on 31 August 1937 by Stalin, Vyacheslav Molotov, Kliment Voroshilov, Andrei Zhdanov, and Lazar Kaganovich. The death sentence was pronounced by the Military Collegium of the Supreme Court of the Soviet Union on 2 September 1937 and at the same day Chatto was executed by Firing Squad.

On 10 July 1938, A. C. N. Nambiar, Chattopadhyaya's brother-in-law, wrote to Nehru about the arrest. He replied on 21 July, agreeing to try to find out about Chattopadhyaya's fate.

== Evaluation ==
J. Campbell Ker's Political Trouble in India: 1907–1917 discusses Chattopadhyaya. He described some of the less appealing aspects of his character and actions.

Colleagues including M. N. Roy and Dr. Abhinash Bhattacharya commented on his leadership, intelligence, and personality.

In his autobiography decades later, Jawaharlal Nehru wrote of Chatto:

An entirely different type of person was Virendranath Chattopadhyay, member of a famous family in India. Popularly known as Chatto he was a very able and a very delightful person. He was always hard up, his clothes were very much the worse for wear and often he found it difficult to raise the wherewithal for a meal. But his humour and light heartedness never left him. He had been some years senior to me during my educational days in England. He was at Oxford when I was at Harrow. Since those days he had not returned to India and sometimes a fit of homesickness came to him when he longed to be back. All his home-ties had long been severed and it is quite certain that if he came to India he would feel unhappy and out of joint. But in spite of the passage of time the home pull remains. No exile can escape the malady of his tribe, that consumption of the soul, as Mazzini called it ... Of the few I met, the only persons who impressed me intellectually were Virendranath Chattopadhyay and M. N. Roy. Chatto was not, I believe, a regular communist, but he was communistically inclined.

Chattopadhyaya's family line survives today in Calcutta.

== Representation in other media ==
Chatto was well known in Great Britain and India as a revolutionary. He is believed to have inspired Somerset Maugham's character of "Chandralal" in his short story, "Giulia Lazzari"; (its character of Ashenden was based upon Maugham).. The American writer Agnes Smedley, who was involved with Chatto for eight years, used him as a model for the character Ananda in her novel Daughter of Earth.. The Indian revolutionary in Berlin, A. C. N. Nambiar, had married Chatto's sister Suhasini.

== See also ==
- Hindu–German Conspiracy
- Indian independence movement
