= Nanjinad =

Historical region in India

Nanjinad (pronounced Nanjil Nadu) is a historical region in India corresponding to present-day Thovalai and Agastheeshwaram of Kanyakumari district.

== Etymology ==
The name is derived from nanj, meaning "plough", and nad, meaning "land".

Economy

It is an important centre of rice cultivation. It is one of the five divisions of Venad (historical_region), which was divided for administrative purpose.

== History ==
Five Thirupappur families ruled the five lands of Venad. The Nanjilnad was ruled from a palace in Panavilai in the south uphill of the Kottaaru harbour. Parts of Nanjil nadu were intermittently ruled by Pandiyaas, and those lands were purchased by Venad before the declaration of Thivithaamcore Kingdom. It was known as the land of Nanji Kuravan. a regional ruler.

== Tax revenue ==
Kavalkinaru was the only gateway for the trade between Pandiya kingdom and Chaera Kingdom. Kavalkinaru toll brought the kingdom a good revenue. The last chieftain of Kavalkinaru toll was Maathavadiyaan Thirupappur, whose family was staying in Vethakarakudieruppu.

Vattakkottai was the storehouse of pearls. The fort was often taken over by Pandiyas and even Europeans. Vattakkottai was managed by Venad and it was an important source of tax revenue.

Both taluks are fertile lands with paddy fields, coconut farms, and fishing hamlets, which formed a good part of Venad revenue.

The ships entering from the Arabian Sea to Kottaru harbour through the Palayaaru had to pay taxes based on the commodities they traded. A minimum of 200 bullock carts came from Pandiya Elasa Naadu to Kottaru harbour to cross to the Kottaru market and to Vaniga Vizhai yard. Kottar St.Xaviers Church campus had a choultry belonging to Elasa Naadu which accommodated more than 200 traders.

Vaniga Vizhai yard stored timber, coconut and paddy besides other trade items.

Nanjil Nadu tax revenues were stored in Kalasamirakki Kudieruppu east of Panavizhai Palace of Thirupappur Royals. Maaraveera Pandiyan Thirupappur followed by Ezha Marthandan Thirupappur(Swamiyadiyaar Thirupappur) and his tribes were managing the tax revenue.

== Safety of traders ==
An army was stationed uphill of Kottaru harbour called Pattaazha Vizhai. The army was supported by 12 Aasaans who managed the Panchavankaattu Chaalai (The University of 64 Arts). The army provided security to the Vaniga Vizhai Yard, Kalasamirakki Kudieruppu treasury, the Kottaru Harbour and Market, the Kavalkinaru Toll and the Vattakkottai pearl storage.

From Vaniga Vizhai, the bullock cart industry had 7 units, each specialising in making different parts of the cart. Later some units were shifted near Chettikkulam and in the eastern gate of the harbour.
