= Bhupendranath Datta =

Indian revolutionary hero (1880-1961)

- শ্রী ভূপেন্দ্রনাথ দত্ত
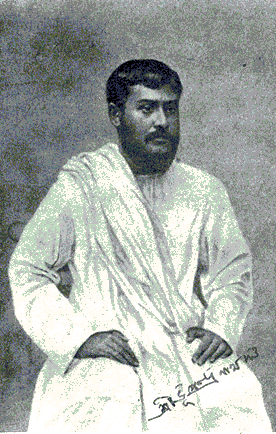
- Sri Bhupendranath Datta
- Born: Bhupendranath Datta; 4 September 1880; Calcutta, Bengal, British India (now West Bengal, India)
- Died: 25 December 1961 (aged 81); Calcutta, West Bengal, India
- Education: New York University; Brown University; University of Hamburg
- Occupations: Revolutionary; Freedom Fighter; Biological Anthropologist
- Known for: Being a Revolutionary
- Notable work: Baishnaba Sahitye (in Bengali); Bharatera Dvitiya Svadhinatara Samgrama:Aprakasita Rajanitika (in Bengali); Bharatiya Samaja-Paddhati (in Bengali); Dialectics of Hindu Ritualism; Studies in Indian Social Polity; Swami Vivekananda, Patriot-prophet:A Study
- Political party: Jugantar; Ghadar Party; Communist International; AITUC
- Movement: Indian Independence Movement
- Parents: Vishwanath Datta (father); Bhubaneshwari Devi (mother)
- Relatives: Swami Vivekananda (12 January 1863 — 4 July 1902), Mahendranath Datta (1 August 1869 — 15 October 1956 (both elder brother), Sarnabala Devi (1860 — 16 February 1932) (elder sister), Vishwanath Datta (father), Bhuvaneshwari Devi (mother), Durgaprasad Datta (paternal grandfather), Raghumani Basu (maternal grandmother)

Bhupendranath Datta (4 September 1880 – 25 December 1961) was an Indian communist revolutionary and later a noted sociologist and anthropologist. He was younger brother of Swami Vivekananda, and he was also associated with Rishi Aurobindo in his political works. In his youth, he was closely associated with the Jugantar movement, serving as the editor of Jugantar Patrika until his arrest and imprisonment in 1907. In his later revolutionary career, he was privy to the Indo-German Conspiracy. The Asiatic Society today holds the Dr. Bhupendranath Datta memorial lecture in his honour.

Datta was also a writer with several books on Indian culture and society to his credit. He wrote a book named Swami Vivekananda, Patriot-prophet.

== Early life and education ==
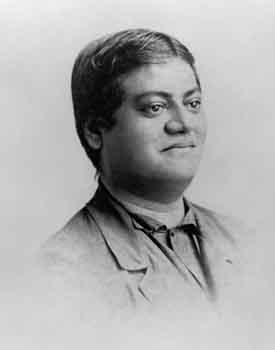
Datta was younger brother of Swami Vivekananda. Datta wrote a book Swami Vivekananda, Patriot-prophet in which he discussed Vivekananda's socialist view.

Datta was born on 4 September 1880 in the town of Calcutta, the capital of Bengal Presidency, the largest province of British India at that time. His parents were Vishwanath Datta and Bhuvaneshwari Datta. He had two elder brothers, Narendranath Datta (later known as Swami Vivekananda) and Mahendranath Datta. Vishwanath Datta was an attorney of Calcutta High Court and Bhuvaneshwari Devi was a housewife. Datta was enrolled in Ishwar Chandra Vidyasagar's Metropolitan Institution from where he passed entrance examination. In his youth, he joined Brahmo Samaj led by Keshub Chandra Sen and Debendranath Tagore. Here he met Sivanath Sastri who deeply influenced him. Datta's religious and social beliefs were shaped by Brahmo Samaj which included belief in a caste-less society, in a single God and revolts against superstitions.

== Revolutionary activities ==
=== In India ===
Datta decided to join Indian independence movement, and joined Bengal Revolutionary Society formed by Pramathanath Mitra in 1902. In 1906, he became the editor of the newspaper Jugantar Patrika. This newspaper was the mouthpiece of the Revolutionary Party of Bengal. In this period he became a close associate of Sri Aurobindo and Barindra Ghosh.

In 1907, Datta was arrested by British police with the charge of sedition and was sentenced to one year's imprisonment.

=== In USA ===
After release in 1908 he left India for the United States. After his arrival, he stayed at the "India House" for a while. He finished his post-graduate studies and obtained an M.A. degree from Brown University.

=== In Germany ===
Datta joined Ghadar Party of California and there he studied about socialism and communism. During World War I, he went to Germany and started revolutionary and political activities there. In 1916, he became the secretary of Indian Independence Committee in Berlin. He remained the secretary of this organisation until 1918. He took memberships of German Anthropological Society in 1920 and German Asiatic Society in 1924.

In 1921 Datta went to Moscow to join Comintern. Manabendra Nath Roy and Birendranath Dasgupta also attended this year's Comintern. During the visit Datta presented Vladimir Lenin a research paper on political condition of contemporary India. He obtained a doctorate degree in Anthropology from the University of Hamburg in 1923.

=== Back in India ===
Then he returned to India and decided to join Indian National Congress. He became members of Bengal Regional Congress in 1927—28 and All India Congress Committee in 1929. In the annual conference of Indian National Congress organised in Karachi in 1930, he proposed a fundamental right for Indian farmers and had it accepted by the Congress Committee led by Jawaharlal Nehru. He chaired two All India Trade Union Congress' annual conference. He was arrested for his political activities.

Bhupendranath returned to a much-changed India after 16 long years, in April 1925. He fully cooperated with the newly formed Communist Party of India, established in Kanpur, and took part in the Workers’ and Peasants’Party (WPP). His first political activity was participation in Political Sufferers’ Conference in Gauhati in December 1926, presiding over it. Bhupen said that not only the Indian bourgeoisie but also the common masses had joined the struggle for freedom.

Bhupendranath attended the annual conference of WPP in 1927, where he met Nalini Gupta. He spread ideas of socialism and Marxism among youth, speaking about Russian revolution. Veteran Communist and TU leader Dr Ranen Sen recalled that Dr Bhupendranath used to take political classes among young revolutionaries on Marxism. Many of them later joined the CPI under his influence.

Famous Communist historian Chinmohan Sehanavis recalls his indebtedness to Bhupendranath for his training in Marxism thus: "I came in contact with Shri Bhupendranath Dutta during 1933-34. When I expressed my desire to study socialism and Marxism from him", he asked whether it was for becoming a scholar or a mass worker. Sehanavis told him he wanted to work among workers and peasants.

=== Organizer of Students, Youth ===
Bhupendranath was a much sought after leader. He delivered presidential address at Dacca District Youngmen's Conference in 1927. In a letter to S A Dange, on 12 November 1927, on the proposed first all India Socialist Youth Congress, Bhupendranath wrote: "This Congress is intended for those young men and women of India who hold Marxist worldview, and they only are welcome to be the delegates of the Congress."

Socialist Youth Congress was held on 27 December 1927, in Calcutta. Bhupendranath as chairman of reception committee drew attention of youth to Marxism and suggested formation of study circles. Jawaharlal Nehru presided over. All Bengal Youth Association was formed at the beginning of 1928, with Bhupendranath as the president of the organization and as the main speaker at its conference.

Bhupendranath also spoke at the conference of Young Comrades’ League at Rajshahi in April 1930. His speech helped many young men to give up anarchism and come over to communism.

Bhupen presided over Khulna district students’ conference on 5 May 1929, Burdwan district students’ conference on 17 August 1929, Faridpur students’ conference in June 1931, and others. He urged upon the students to follow Marx. Famous Communist leader Benoy Krishna Choudhury remembers that his acquaintance with Bhupenda began in Hooghly district students’ conference in 1928.

He along with Hiren Mukherjee and Humayun Kabir attended BPSF conference on 12 October 1936.

=== WPP and TU Movement ===
During Meerut Conspiracy Case (1929–33), the Communists outside were in disarray. In Calcutta, an ‘Indian Proletarian Revolutionary Party’ was formed, with Panchu Gopal Bhaduri, Kali Ghosh, Bankim Mukherjee and others. Bhupenda was closely associated. This party worked with Workers’ Party, which it recognized as a branch of CPI. It got in touch with Bombay Group of Sardesai, Ranadive and Kulkarni, and helped Meerut prisoners. It expressed desire to join Calcutta Committee of CPI and were given membership individually. Bishwanath Mukherjee also belonged to this group.

Bhupendranath was active in almost all the major movements: of Kharagpur railways workers, BNR railway workers, TISCO in Jamshedpur, May Day rallies in Calcutta in 1928, etc. He attended Jharia session of AITUC (1928) and was elected its vice-president. He organized a number of trade unions at local and all India levels.

=== Other Mass Organizations ===
Bhupendranath Dutta was the first president of Friends of Soviet Union (FSU), formed in 1941 at the initiative of Prof Hiren Mukherjee and others. Bhupesh Gupta, Chinmohan, Gopal Haldar, Jyoti Basu and others were also present. Bhupenda also took part in the PWA.

=== Not a Member, But with CPI ===
Dr Bhupen Dutta was never a formal member of CPI, but for all practical purposes he functioned as one. He encouraged and recruited members to the party, among them Somnath Lahiri. He also influenced Hare Krishna Konar in his childhood, who later became one of the greatest Marxist revolutionary and peasant leader. He translated important Marxist classics. Among his famous works is the ‘Aprakashita Rajnitik Itihas’ (unpublished political history). He was an active propagandist of Marxism.

He was a great scholar in various fields, with many books and articles to his credit. He brought to light the social and mass aspects of Swami Vivekanand and Ramakrishna Mission, who advocated and worked for the well-being of people.

== Literary works ==
Datta wrote books on different subjects like sociology, history, politics etc. He was a linguist and wrote books in Bengali, Hindi, English, German, Iranian. Few of his notable books are—

- Baishnaba sahitye samajatattva (in Bengali). 1945. ASIN B0000CR4M4.
- Bharatera dvitiya svadhinatara samgrama: Aprakasita rajanitika itihas (in Bengali). 1983. ASIN B0000CR5R2.
- Bharatiya samaja-paddhati (in Bengali). 1983. ASIN B0000CR5CO.
- Dialectics of Hindu ritualism. 1950. ASIN B0000CQWOM.
- Studies in Indian Social Polity. Nababharat Publishers. 1983. ASIN B0000CQASU.
- Swami Vivekananda, Patriot-prophet: A Study. Nababharat Publishers. 1954. ASIN B0000CR0OQ.
