= Berlin Committee =

Pan-Indian independence think tank and conspiracy circle in WW1-era Germany

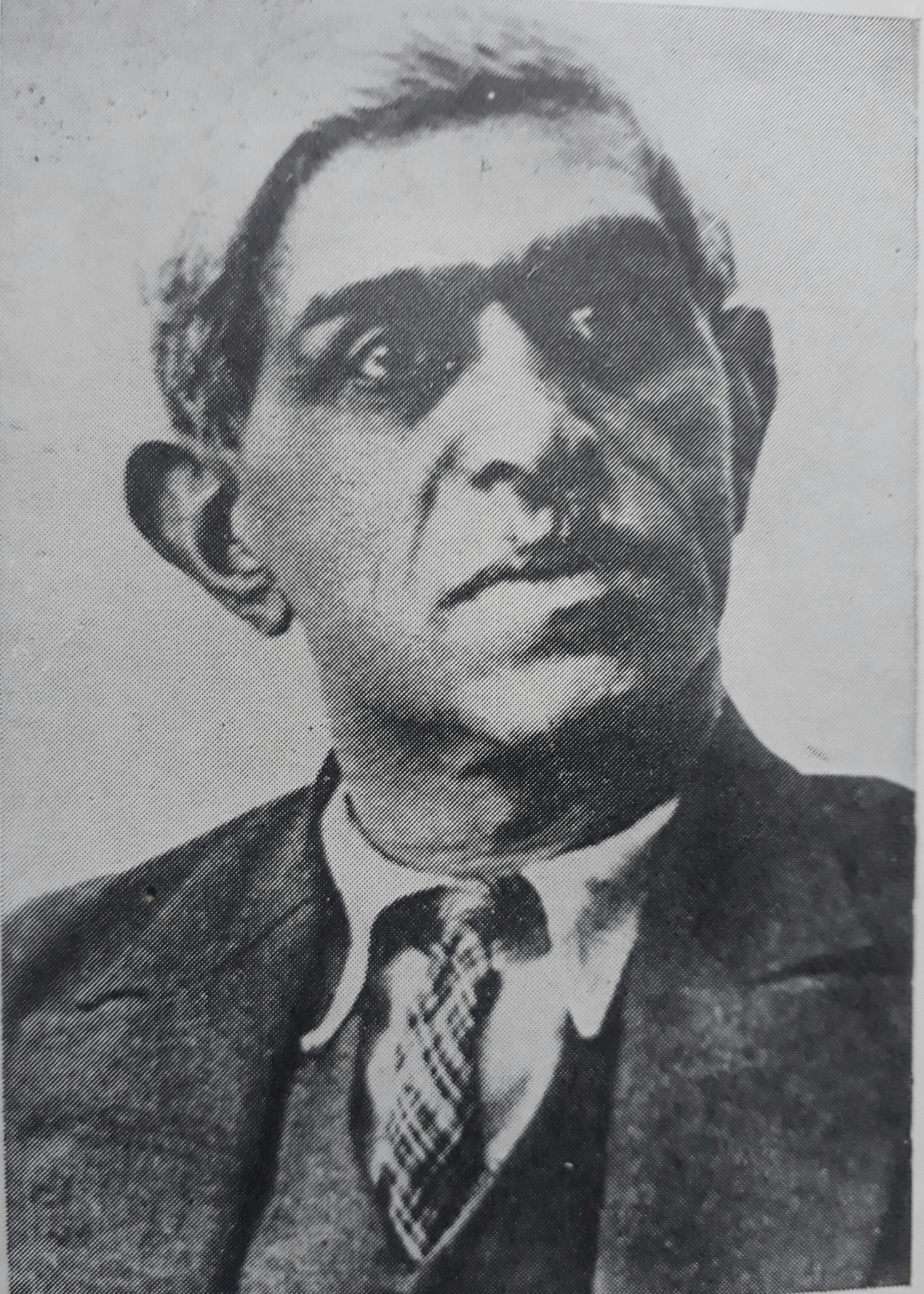
Virendranath Chattopadhyaya was a member of the committee

The Berlin Committee, later known as the Indian Independence Committee (German: Indisches Unabhängigkeitskomitee) after 1915, was an organisation formed in Germany in 1914 during World War I by Indian students and political activists residing in the country. The purpose of the committee was to promote the cause of Indian Independence. Initially called the Berlin–Indian Committee, the organisation was renamed the Indian Independence Committee and came to be an integral part of the Hindu–German Conspiracy. Members of the committee included Virendranath Chattopadhyaya (alias Chatto), Chempakaraman Pillai, Dr Jnanendra Das Gupta, and Abinash Bhattacharya.

== Background ==
A number of Indians, notably Shyamji Krishna Varma, had formed the India House in England in 1905. This organisation, with the support of Indian luminaries like Dadabhai Naoroji, Lala Lajpat Rai, Madame Bhikaji Cama and others, offered scholarships to Indian students, promoted nationalistic work, and was a major platform for anti-colonial opinions and views. The Indian Sociologist, published by Krishna Varma, was a notable anti-colonial publication. Prominent Indian Nationalists associated with the India House included Vinayak Damodar Savarkar (also known as Veer Savarkar), Virendranath Chattopadhyaya (alias Chatto), and Har Dayal.

The British government kept track of India House because of the nature of its work and the increasingly inciting tone of The Indian Sociologist, which proposed killing British colonial officials. English detectives followed and watched the student leaders in India House. In 1909, Madan Lal Dhingra, closely associated with the India House, shot and killed William Hutt Curzon Wyllie, the political ADC to the Secretary of State for India. In the aftermath of the assassination, India House was rapidly suppressed. Evidence found showed that Browning pistols were being sent to India in order to bring about an armed revolution. Savarkar was deported from England, and denied asylum by the French government on a stop in Marseilles) while Krishna Varma successfully fled to Europe. Those who continued the struggle, including Virendranath Chattopadhyaya, moved to Germany, while a number of the leadership moved to Paris. This set of fugitives would later coalesce in the Berlin Committee.

== World War I ==
At the outbreak of World War I, Indian nationalists looked for ways to use the enmities to support their goals. As early as 1912, the German Foreign Office had considered supporting the Pan-Islamist and Bengali revolutionary movement in India to weaken the British position.

The Kaiser had considered the option on 31 July 1914 when Russian mobilisation was confirmed, and the scope of British mobilisation against Germany was becoming evident. In September 1914, the German Chancellor, Theobald von Bethmann Hollweg, was authorised by the Kaiser to sanction German activity against British India. The German effort was headed by Max von Oppenheim, an archaeologist and the head of the newly formed Intelligence Bureau for the East. He was to organize the Indian student groups into a cohesive group. Oppenheim also convinced Har Dayal of the feasibility of the project.

A group of Indians resident in Germany, headed by M. Prabhakar (then teaching at Düsseldorf after graduating from Heidelberg), along with Abd ur Rahman and A Siddiqui, had issued statements condemning England and France for their support of the Czar in Russia. As these students were political novices, Oppenheim sought to find more prominent revolutionaries who would carry more weight in the community. Otto Gunther von Wesendonck, a young officer of the Auswärtiges Amt, was given the task of organising revolutionary outbreaks along the Indian and Russian border. With the help of their close acquaintance Anna Maria Simon, Abhinash Bhattacharya and Virendranath Chattopadhyaya issued similar statements against Britain and France, which were distributed in Austria-Hungary, Switzerland and the Netherlands in addition to Germany, attracting editorial comments. The duo, with the help of Frau Simon, set up meetings with the Berlin Foreign office.

=== Berlin Committee ===
Arriving at Berlin, they were assigned a building in the Schöneberg suburbs, as their new headquarters. In their first meeting with the foreign office liaison Max von Oppenheim, on 3 September 1915, Chattopadhyay (also known as Chatto) identified the goals and requirements of the committee:

- For the Germans to provide money, arms, experts in military strategy
- Facilitate repatriation of Indian patriots in Europe and provide asylum in case of failure (and not yield to pressure as had happened in the case of Savarkar)
- train Indians at Spandau and other military bases, including on submarine mines
- publish literature in Indian languages
- provide aircraft for propaganda airdrops
- provide 10 rupee banknotes for secret use
- support with radio communication
- no concession to Indian Principalities opposed to the plan to form a Socialist Republic

With the help of Oppenheim, messages were sent out to Indian students in German universities, as well as Switzerland, Austria and the Netherlands, who were likely to share the same views. Among those who joined the organisation at the time were Dr. Dhiren Sarkar, Chanji Kersasp, N. S. Marathe, Dr. J. N. Dasgupta, and C. Padmanabhan Pillai, quickly joined by his brother, Champak Raman Pillai. The 'Champak-Chatto' Berlin Committee was founded.

Although the group urged him, Oppenheim refused to approach Shyamji Krishnavarma, then in Geneva, nor did he try to reach Lala Lajpat Rai, then in the United States. The latter was suspected by British intelligence in the United States to be deeply involved in the seditionist movement although he personally refused to enter an alliance with another Imperialist Power. In 1915, Har Dayal and Barkatullah became actively involved in the Berlin Committee and its goals. The committee is known to have sent missions to the Middle Eastern cities of Istanbul and Baghdad, and Kabul, Afghanistan.

== Hindu–German Conspiracy ==
The committee soon established contacts with Indian revolutionaries, including Bagha Jatin. They visited armament and explosives factories to identify war material, and met with Indian prisoners-of-war held in Germany to recruit them to the nationalist cause. Lala Har Dayal, who had fled to Germany after his arrest in the United States, was convinced to lend his support to the committee's cause. They established contacts with the Ghadarite movement in the United States. Dr. Dhiren Sarkar and N.S. Marathe left for Washington, D.C., on 22 September 1915 and, through the German Ambassador, Johann von Bernstoff, established links with the Ghadar Party. The culmination of the American efforts was the Annie Larsen arms plot.

=== Kabul mission ===
The Berlin-Indian Committee (which became the Indian Independence Committee after 1915) created an Indo-German-Turkish mission to the Indo-Iranian border to encourage the tribes to strike against British interests. At this time, the Berlin Committee was in touch with the Khairi brothers (Abdul Jabbar Khairi and Abdul Sattar Khairi) who had settled in Istanbul at the onset of the World War I. In 1917 they had proposed to the Kaiser a plan to lead tribes in Kashmir and North-West Frontier Province against British interests. Another group, led by the Deobandi Maulana Ubaid Allah Sindhi and Mahmud al-Hasan (principal of the Darul Uloom Deoband), had traveled to Kabul in October 1915 with plans to initiate a Muslim insurrection in the tribal belt of India. Ubaid Allah proposed that the Amir of Afghanistan should declare war against Britain while Mahmud al Hasan sought German and Turkish help. Hasan proceeded to Hijaz. Ubaid Allah, in the meantime, established friendly relations with the Amir.

At Kabul, Ubaid Allah, along with some students who had preceded him to Ottoman Turkey to join the Caliph's "Jihad" against Britain, decided that the pan-Islamic cause would be better served by focusing on the Indian Freedom Movement. This group was met by the Indo-German-Turkish mission to Kabul in December 1915, headed by Oskar von Niedermayer and including among its members Werner Otto von Hentig, the German diplomatic representative to Kabul; and Raja Mahendra Pratap, Barkatullah and other prominent nationalists from the Berlin group. Known as the Niedermayer–Hentig mission, it brought members of the Indian movement to India's border, and carried messages from the Kaiser, Enver Pasha, and Abbas Hilmi, the displaced Khedive of Egypt, expressing support for Pratap's mission. They asked the Amir to move against India. The mission's immediate goal was to rally the Amir against British India and to obtain a right of free passage for the conspirators from the Afghan Government.

Although the Amir made no commitment to the group, they found support amongst the Amir's immediate and close political and religious advisory group, including his brother Nasrullah Khan, his sons Inayatullah Khan and Amānullāh Khān, and religious leaders and tribesmen. Afghanistan's then most influential newspaper, the Siraj al-Akhbar, took Barkatullah as an officiating editor in early 1916. Its editor Mahmud Tarzi published a number of inflammatory articles by Raja Mahendra Pratap, as well as increasingly anti-British and pro-Central Powers articles and propaganda. By May 1916, the tone in the paper was deemed serious enough for the British Raj to intercept its issues. In 1916, the Berlin Committee established the Provisional Government of India in Kabul.

Its formation infers the seriousness of intention and purpose of the revolutionaries. The government had Raja Mahendra Pratap as president, Barkatullah as Prime Minister, Ubaidullah Sindhi as the Minister for India, Maulavi Bashir as War Minister and Champakaran Pillai as Foreign Minister. It tried to gain support from the Russian Empire, Republican China, and Japan. Galib Pasha joined them in proclaiming jihad against Britain.

Following the February Revolution in Russia in 1917, Pratap's Government is known to have corresponded with the nascent Soviet Government. In 1918, Pratap met the Russian leader Leon Trotsky in Petrograd before meeting the Kaiser in Berlin; he urged both to mobilise against British India. Under pressure from the British, the Afghans withdrew their cooperation and the mission closed down. The Niedermayer–Hentig Expedition, with associated liaisons of the German mission had a profound effect on the political and social situation in Afghanistan. It catalyzed political change that ended with the assassination of Habibullah in 1919 and the transfer of power to Nasrullah and, subsequently, Amānullah; the Third Anglo-Afghan War began, which led to Afghan Independence.

== End of the Indian Independence Committee ==
The committee was formally disbanded in November 1918, with most of the members shifting their attention to the nascent Soviet Russia. Between 1917 and 1920, most of the members became active Communists.
