= Max Rudolf Kaufmann =

Swiss author, translator from Turkish, and journalist

- Born: 29 April 1886; Basel, Switzerland
- Died: 1963 (aged 76–77); Bonn, Germany
- Education: Ph.D. Philology
- Alma mater: University of Bern, Switzerland
- Occupations: Journalist, Orientalist
- Employer(s): Neue Zürcher Zeitung, Osmanischer Lloyd, Deutsche Allgemeine Zeitung, Hamburger Fremdenblatt, Basel University Library, Inter Nationes
- Known for: various translated books and original articles about Turkey and the Middle East

Max Rudolf Kaufmann (29 April 1886 – 1963), was a Swiss author, translator from Turkish, and journalist, who worked and published in Switzerland, Turkey, the United States and Germany.

== Life ==
Kaufmann was born on 29 April 1886 in Basel and studied philology in Bern, where he obtained his Ph.D. in 1907.

After some years as journalist in Paris, he moved to Constantinople in 1910, where he joined the editorial staff of Osmanischer Lloyd, the German language newspaper co-founded and managed by Dr. Friedrich Schrader, who served as his mentor. He was a German liberal democrat and a sympathizer of the German SPD, Kaufmann soon criticized the arrogant and imperial behaviour of official German representatives in Turkey. He was rather soon fired by the owners of Osmanischer Lloyd (the German Foreign Office and the consortium of the Baghdad Railroad Project), but continued working for various newspapers as a correspondent, including Neue Zürcher Zeitung and Frankfurter Zeitung. The chief correspondent at that time of Frankfurter Zeitung was Paul Weitz, a key figure in German diplomacy at that time and main adversary of Hans Humann.

After German intelligence got hold of a letter where he openly expressed these critical views right in the middle of World War I, in 1916, Kaufmann was deported by the Turkish authorities allied with Germany to Ankara, and later expelled from Turkey. Schrader was fired from the editorial board of Osmanischer Lloyd one year later. Back in Germany, Prof. Dr. Eugen Mittwoch, who just had become head of German Nachrichtenstelle für den Orient, the semi-official German Intelligence and propaganda organisation for the Middle East, immediately hired Kaufmann. After the end of World War I, Kaufmann stayed in Berlin and worked for Deutsche Allgemeine Zeitung, at that time the leading liberal-conservative Berlin newspaper. He worked as deputy editor in chief for some time, until he was fired after the newspaper was bought by the powerful Stinnes trust, and Hugo Stinnes had made Hans Humann, the former German military attache in Constantinople, and back then the main adversary of Weitz, Schrader and Kaufmann, the CEO of the DAZ publisher.

In 1925 Kaufmann moved to the United States, where he became a correspondent of Hamburger Fremdenblatt, at that time Germany's leading business and commerce newspaper, and also served as editor of a German-language daily newspaper in Newark, New Jersey, the New Jersey Freie Zeitung. After the end of the Weimar Republic in 1933, Kaufmann discontinued his work for German media and moved back to his native Switzerland, where he worked for different local papers and also as a librarian at the University Library in Basel.

In 1952, the Adenauer government in Bonn formed Inter Nationes as an organisation to increase Germany's reputation in countries at that time allied with West Germany. Kaufmann moved to Bonn in order to manage the Middle Eastern department of that organisation. At the same time he became active in the Deutsch-Türkische Gesellschaft (German Turkish Society), where he became publisher of the regular proceedings of that association. In Germany, Kaufmann was decorated with the Bundesverdienstkreuz by President Theodor Heuss, who was himself a former journalist and had been active in Constantinople during World War I.

Kaufmann died in 1963 in Bonn.

== Works ==
- Max Rudolf Kaufmann: The Merchant Class in German Literature. Grunau, Bern 1908 (dissertation, University of Bern, 1907).
- Related article: Max Rudolf Kaufmann: The Merchant Class in German Literature up to the End of the Seventeenth Century. In: Die Grenzboten: Journal of Politics, Literature, and Art (1841–1922). Vol. 69, pp. 110–121. Link
- Max Rudolf Kaufmann: Pera and Istanbul. Kiepenheuer, Weimar 1915.
- Bey Oghlu: Turkish Women. Their Life in the Harem and Reflected in Turkish Stories. Delphin, Munich 1916.
- H. Oghlu Bey: German Grammar for Turks. Hartleben, Vienna 1918.
- Hassan Oghlu Bei: Turkish-German Conversations. With a Grammatical Introduction. Also a Textbook of Colloquial Turkish. Hartleben, Vienna/Leipzig 1919.
- Max Rudolf Kaufmann: Ahasver – A Film Poem. New York 1934 (entry in the US Copyright Register, Library of Congress). link
