= Eugen Mittwoch =

German-Jewish scholar (1876–1942)

- Born: 4 December 1876; Schrimm, Province of Posen, Prussia, Germany (now Śrem in Poland)
- Died: 8 November 1942 (aged 65); London, England
- Education: Ph. D., Islamic Studies
- Alma mater: Berlin University, Rabbinical Seminary of Berlin
- Occupations: Jewish theologist, rabbi, orientalist
- Employer(s): Berlin University, American Jewish Joint Distribution Committee

Eugen Mittwoch (4 December 1876 – 8 November 1942) was a German-Jewish scholar, the founder of Modern Islamic Studies in Germany, and Berlin director of the American Jewish Joint Distribution Committee.

== Biography ==
Coming from an old Orthodox Jewish family, Mittwoch was born on 4 December 1876 in Schrimm, Prussian Province of Posen, Imperial Germany (now Srem in Poland). He initially wanted to become a Rabbi. During his studies in Berlin he discovered Islamic studies and did his doctorate with Eduard Sachau.

During World War I, Mittwoch was the head of the German Nachrichtenstelle für den Orient from 1916 until 1918. After the agency initially employed people who advocated Jihad and violence against the Western powers, Mittwoch hired more liberal and cosmopolitan writers and intellectuals for the Nachrichtenstelle such as the Swiss Max Rudolf Kaufmann (Mittwoch hired him for the Nachrichtenstelle, after he was arrested, briefly imprisoned and deported from Turkey because Turkish intelligence had found letter of Kaufmann criticizing German-Turkish militarism and jingoism), the Social Democrat Friedrich Schrader and the Zionist Nahum Goldmann. Schrader and Kaufmann were correspondents for the Jewish-owned liberal Frankfurter Zeitung and close associates of Paul Weitz, one of the sharpest critics of German collaboration with the genocidal politics of the Young Turks.

In the 1920s, Mittwoch was the leading orientalist in Germany, and the founder of a more politically oriented, modern science of Middle East Studies, in contrast to the traditional philologic, apolitical approach very much influenced by Goethe. He was director of the Oriental Seminary at the University of Berlin.

Letter from Mittwoch to Snouck Hurgronje (1921).

In the early 1920s, Mittwoch was involved in the planning of the Hebrew University and its School of Oriental Studies. He was invited to Jerusalem to receive a professorship of Arabic for one year, but apparently refused the invitation.

Among his students at the University were Rabbi Joseph B. Soloveichik (later of Yeshiva University), Rav Yizchak Hutner (Yeshiva Chaim Berlin), Rav Menachem Mendel Schneersohn (later the 7th Lubavitcher Rebbe), And Avraham Joshua Heschel (later of Hebrew Union College, Cincinnati, and Jewish Theological Seminary (NY).

Since he was a leading specialist on Ethiopian languages world-wide, Mittwoch did not lose his academic position in 1933 immediately like almost all his Jewish colleagues in Germany did at that time. This had to do with a special intervention by Mussolini with Hitler on behalf of Mittwoch. Because of their colonial activities in Ethiopia, the Italians were extremely interested in Mittwoch's knowledge and research. Mittwoch was very active on behalf of the Ethiopian Jews (Falasha), and was also one of the first German Jews who could speak fluent Modern Hebrew.

Starting in 1933, Mittwoch used his "privileged" position in Germany (he continued to receive his salary as a German professor until the beginning of the war) on behalf of the Jewish community, he became head of the American Jewish Joint Distribution Committee in Berlin. However, in 1938, after Kristallnacht, also Mittwoch had to emigrate, and moved via Paris to London with his immediate family. During the last 18 months of his life, he worked for the Middle East department of the British Ministry of Information under the leadership of Ernst Jäckh.

The remaining family, including his mother, who was murdered in Bergen-Belsen, were murdered in the Shoah. A daughter Adele Mittwoch (1925–2011) was a renowned psychotherapist in England, specializing in group psychotherapy, another daughter Agnes (born 1926) later immigrated to Israel (made aliyah) and was a university lecturer in Jerusalem. The oldest daughter, Ursula, born 1924, was professor for human genetics at the University College London and, in 2014, was still scientifically active and celebrated her 90th birthday in her old institute.

Mittwoch died on 8 November 1942 in London, England, UK.
