= Douglas Grant =

Aboriginal Australian soldier and public servant

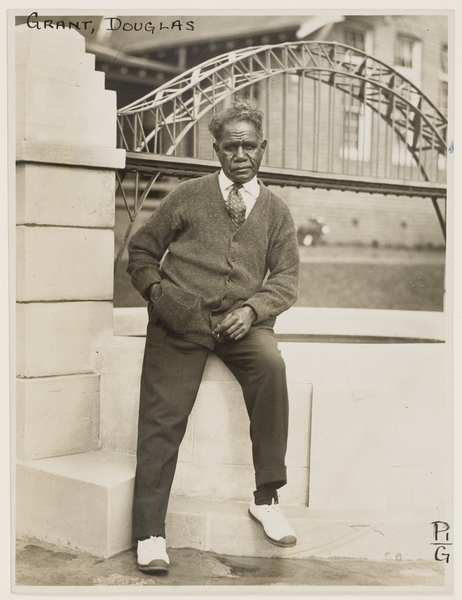
- World War I veteran Douglas Grant sitting on the wall of a commemorative model of the Sydney Harbour Bridge, Callan Park, where he worked as a clerk. Photo taken by Sam Hood in 1931.
- Born: 1885; Atherton
- Died: 4 December 1951 (aged 65–66); Little Bay
- Burial place: Botany Cemetery
- Relatives: Robert Grant and Elizabeth Grant, foster brother Henry S Grant
- Military career
- Allegiance: Australian
- Branch: Army
- Rank: Private
- Unit: 13th Battalion
- Conflicts: World War I
- Other work: Labourer

Douglas Grant (1885 – 4 December 1951) was an Aboriginal Australian soldier, draughtsman, public servant, journalist, public speaker, and factory worker. During World War I, he was captured by the German army and held as a prisoner of war at Wittenberg, and later at Wünsdorf, Zossen, near Berlin.

== Early life and career ==
Grant was born around 1885 into the rainforest Indigenous Nations of north Queensland near Malanda on the Atherton Tablelands. Grant's repatriation file (Service Number 6020) records his birth as 5 January 1887.

In 1887, as an infant orphaned as a result of a massacre of Aboriginal people at Boonjie. After the massacre of the Ngadjon people by white miners and the Native Police during the Australian Frontier Wars, he was 'rescued' by taxidermists Robert Grant and E.J. Cairn, who were in the region on a collecting expedition for the Australian Museum. The Aboriginal child was later fostered and renamed Douglas by Robert Grant and his wife Elizabeth. Then, contrary to the laws of the time they smuggled him aboard the steamer ship 'Barcoo' from Cairns, Queensland, across state jurisdictions and eventually to Lithgow. There, he lived with the extended Grant family until Robert and Elizabeth moved, together with their son Henry, to another Scottish diaspora community in the Sydney suburb of Annandale.

Grant attended Annandale Public School and trained as a draughtsman, working for Mort's Dock & Engineering Company in Sydney. In 1913, he was employed as a wool classer at Belltrees, near Scone. It was from Scone that he enlisted to serve in World War One, and numerous newspaper articles of the time celebrated his enlistment by describing his educational attainments, Scottish cultural skills, and skin colour:

"a man of high attainments, with a great love for Shakespeare and poetry generally. He is an artist, and is said to play the bagpipes as well as any Scot."

== World War One ==
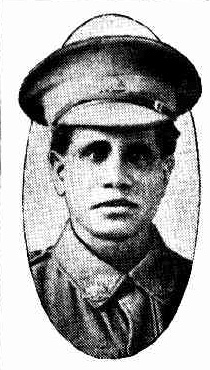
Douglas Grant seen in The Herald, 9 September 1916

Grant first joined the Australian Army at Scone on 13 January 1916. Grant completed training with the 34th Battalion, but was discharged because indigenous people were officially barred from military service. However, as the number of possible recruits dwindled, such legal barriers were increasingly ignored by recruiters. Grant re-enlisted in August 1916 and was sent to France to join the 13th Battalion. Douglas Grant was one of more than 1,000 Indigenous men who served in World War I.

On 11 April 1917, during the First Battle of Bullecourt, Grant was wounded and captured. He was first sent to Wittenberg, where POWs received very small amounts of rations. Douglas Grant's POW colleague Harry Adams later remembered their experience in the Wittenberg camp, also recalling Grant's wit and sense of humour:

"We had been here about three or four months. We weren't getting very much food, so Doug with others he used to go sick with the idea of getting the doctor to declare them unfit for further laborious work around the front. The doctor, on examining him [Douglas] said 'You don't look sick!' Doug said, 'What have I got to do – turn white ... before you can tell whether I'm sick or not?'

While at Wittenberg Grant was noticed by social scientists from the Royal Prussian Phonographic Commission which had been established by the psychologist and musicologist Carl Stumpf, and by linguist Wilhelm Doegen, to study the languages and culture of the men held captive as German prisoners of war. Grant was transferred to the Wünsdorf POW camp and like many of the colonial soldiers from the British and French empires there, he became an object of study as part of this major research project. German doctors, scientists, anthropologists and artists sought to examine and document him. One German scientist argued that the POW camps were "a völkerschau [people show] without comparison", and Grant later told his war colleague Roy Kinghorne that "he was measured all over, and upside down and inside out". However, Grant was given some favour within the camp and allowed a certain level of freedom within it. The German sculptor Rudolf Marcuse modelled Grant's bust in bronze, and this significant work was only re-discovered by researchers in 2015.

During his incarceration (April 1917 to December 1918), Grant became president of the British Help Committee (The Red Cross) and organised food parcels and medical supplies for the large number of Indian and African prisoners held at the Halbmondlager prisoner-of-war camp for coloured soldiers, near Zossen. Grant wrote on behalf of his fellow prisoners to agencies such as the British Help Committee, the Invalid Comfort Fund for Prisoners of War, the British Red Cross and the Merchant Seaman's Help Society. The Wünsdorf POW camp is also significant as the site chosen by Max von Oppenheim and the Nachrichtenstelle für den Orient (German Intelligence Bureau for the East) to persuade Muslim prisoners of war — men who had been fighting for the British and French — to change sides and join the Ottoman-German Alliance. As part of this scheme the Intelligence Bureau for the East built the first mosque on German soil at Wünsdorf in 1915. A number of the men selected as part of this 'Jihad' scheme would have been known to Douglas Grant, who was given the task of supporting the wellbeing of British colonial troops within his role as President of the British Help Committee.

On 22 December 1918, Grant was repatriated from Germany to England. He took the opportunity to visit his adoptive fathers' family in Scotland. Grant was able to mimic a Scottish accent and attracted much attention in Scotland. In 1919 he sailed back to Australia on the troopship Medic and arrived in Sydney on 12 June. He was discharged from service on 9 July and returned to civilian life, and to his former position as a draughtsman at Mort's Dock.

== Post-war and death ==
Not long after returning to Sydney, Grant left Mort's Dock and moved to Lithgow, working as a labourer at a paper products factory and then at the Lithgow Small Arms Factory. Here Grant also became Secretary of the Lithgow Returned and Services League (RSL), and lobbied government to keep returned soldiers employed. Despite Grant's war heroism and position within the RSL he was still subjected to acts of racism while working at the Small Arms Factory, and a colleague later recalled that Grant had to 'spit on his tools to make sure no-one had taken a blow-torch to them' while he was away from his work-station.

During the 1920s, while living in both Lithgow and Sydney, Grant was also an active member of the Australian Museum (Sydney) fraternity and would often perform Scottish songs at the 'museum smokos' according to the museum's Curator of Fishes Gilbert Percy Whitley. His father Robert Grant was a taxidermist at the museum and, after his retirement in 1918, was succeeded by Douglas' foster brother.

Grant became a sought-after public speaker, giving lectures on numerous subjects including the experience of war, Aboriginal rights, and the significant role of women in society. Beyond his public appearances Grant was admired by many as a raconteur, a bagpipe player, and as a reciter of the poetry of Robert Burns and numerous Australian poets including Henry Lawson with whom he had a friendship.

A significant piece of journalism by Grant was published in a major Sydney newspaper, the Sunday Pictorial, on 3 February 1929. The article, titled A Call for Justice, and argued that the 1928 Coniston Massacre represented a 'wake-up call' for all Australians and 'a great unparalleled crime'. Grant wrote: 'What can we do and what are we doing for the first inhabitants, the rightful owners of this land which was usurped and portioned as your heritage, the outcome of war and bloodshed? The government has to awaken and take measures to ensure the lives of the remnants of Australia’s original inhabitants'. Throughout his wartime experience and during his public speaking work and advocacy for indigenous rights during the 1920s, Douglas Grant had achieved a level of fame that ensured that the press noted his activist activities. For example, when the Condobolin Football Club refused to play against an Aboriginal football team, Grant's protest was printed by several newspapers and Grant was quoted in several saying: 'the colour line was never drawn in the trenches [during WW1]'. Grant continued this public service advocacy and media work throughout his life, and much later, while living in Lithgow, he was also a regular guest on radio 2LT Lithgow's Diggers Show. A number of commentators, such as the historian John Maynard, have described Grant's effort to establish connections between Aboriginal and non-Aboriginal communities as that of a cultural 'bridge-builder'.

In 1931, the cumulative effects of racial prejudices, exacerbated by his Grant suffering from "shell shock" (probably post-traumatic stress disorder), and a decade of insecure work in Sydney, Lithgow, other parts of rural NSW and Victoria, together with the stresses of being in the public eye, resulted in him being admitted to the military wing (Ward B) of Callan Park Mental Hospital. The racism of the time is epitomised in a popular story published in the Sydney tabloid newspaper Smith's Weekly, that reads like an obituary, and describes Grant's admission into Callan Park in 1931 under the title The Bitter Tragedy of Douglas Grant. Grant remained at Callan Park Hospital from 1931 until 1939, during which time he designed and built a replica of the Sydney Harbour Bridge as a memorial to the ‘fallen’ of WW1 that is still standing today. He also engaged in sporting activities such as golf and bowls, ran errands, and spent occasional afternoons drinking in the nearby Balmain and Rozelle pubs, much to the annoyance of his nurses. In 1939 he was released back into the community.

In his later years, Grant travelled between relatives and friends living in Sydney, Lithgow, and in the small townships along the coast south of Sydney, often staying in Helensburgh. There, relatives such as June Madge remembered him as an interesting and much loved presence within their households although noting that Grant was subject to racism in the wider community. Grant also lived with former WW1 colleagues such as Peter Holburn, and also lived at the Salvation Army's old men's quarters at Dee Why. After 1950 Grant lived at the Bare Island War Veteran's Home in La Perouse. It is not known if Grant associated with the Aboriginal community at La Perouse.

Grant died in Prince Henry Hospital, Little Bay, on 4 December 1951. His cause of death was a subarachnoid hemorrhage. He is buried at Botany Cemetery. He never married or had children.

== Legacy ==
The Douglas Grant Park, located at Chester Street, Annandale, is named in his memory.

== In the arts and media ==
=== Radio ===
Grant's life was the subject of a 1957 Australian radio feature on the ABC.

=== Theatre ===
A character in the play Black Diggers, written in 2013 and staged in January 2014, is based on Grant. Journalist and author Paul Daley wrote a long article about Grant in the March 2015 edition of Meanjin, later republished in The Guardian.

=== Print ===
In 2021 the University of Newcastle historian John Ramsland published a fictionalised biography of Grant, entitled The Legacy of Douglas Grant: A Notable Aborigine in War and Peace.

=== Documentary film and audio ===
Filmmaker and academic Tom Murray, released The Skin of Others featuring Tom E. Lewis as Grant. Lewis died during the making of the film, which was released posthumously in 2020. The film premiered at the Sydney Film Festival. and later screened by SBS Television and NITV. A song from the film inspired by Grant's life, "Ballad of the Bridge Builders", co-written by Murray and David Bridie and performed by Archie Roach, won the APRA Award for Best Original Song Composed for the Screen. Ursula Yovich performed the song at the 2020 Awards Ceremony.

Preceding the film, Murray produced an audio documentary by the same name for ABC Radio National.
