= Hindostan (Urdu newspaper) =

First Urdu-language newspaper produced in Germany

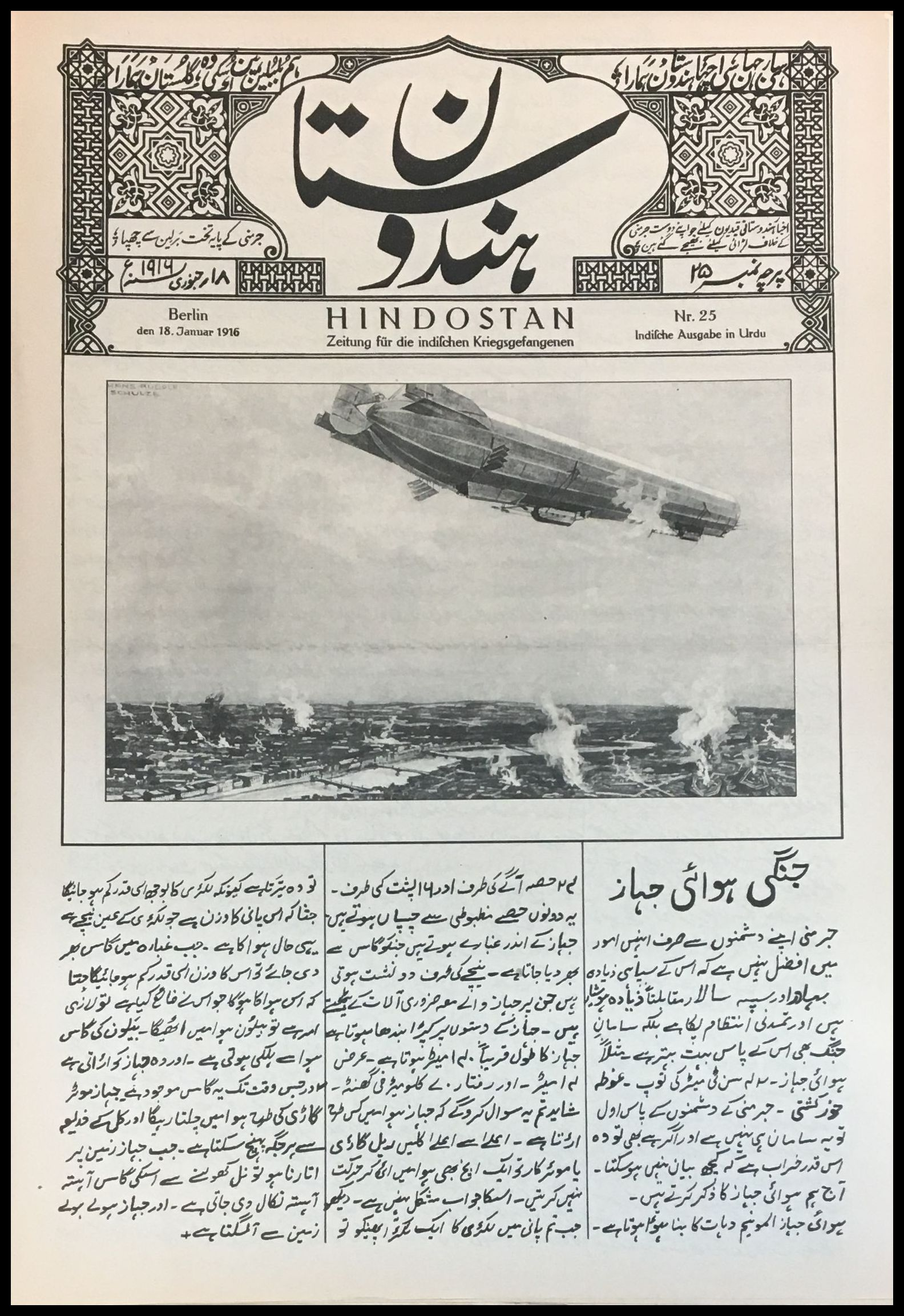
- Illustration of a Zeppelin airship accompanying an article in the Urdu edition of Hindostan, issue 25 from January 14, 1916.
- Type: Prisoner-of-war camp newspaper
- Format: Handwritten, photolithographed
- Owner: Nachrichtenstelle für den Orient
- Publisher: German Foreign Office
- Editor: Indian members of the Berlin Indian Independence Committee
- Founded: March 1915
- Ceased publication: August 1918
- Language: Urdu
- Headquarters: Wünsdorf, German Empire

Hindostan (Urdu: ہندوستان), was the first Urdu-language newspaper produced in Germany during the First World War for Indian Muslim prisoners of war (POWs). Published by the German Foreign Office’s propaganda machinery in Berlin from March 1915 through August 1918, the two-page handwritten issues—reproduced via photolithography—were part of German propaganda efforts to promote jihad and shift the allegiance of POWs held in camps like Wünsdorf’s Halbmondlager and nearby facilities.

== Historical context ==
=== POWs camps for Muslim soldiers ===
Germany established specialized camps—most notably Halbmondlager (“Half-Moon Camp”) near Wünsdorf—for Muslim prisoners from the British, French, and Russian armies. The aim was to cultivate sympathy for the Central Powers, encouraging jihad-themed propaganda under the guise of religious camaraderie. In these camps, detainees could worship, observe religious holidays, and even attend a wooden mosque, the first built in Germany.

=== German propaganda initiatives ===
As part of its psychological warfare strategy, Germany’s Nachrichtenstelle für den Orient ("Information Center for the Orient") produced various language editions of a camp newspaper called El Dschihad (“The Jihad”), supporting the broader goal of mobilizing Muslim POWs. In parallel, Hindostan was published specifically in Hindi and Urdu for South Asian prisoners.
