= Friedrich Schrader =

German philologist (1865–1922)

- Born: 19 November 1865; Wolmirstedt, Prussia
- Died: 28 August 1922 (aged 56); Berlin, Prussia, Germany
- Other name: Ischtiraki
- Occupations: teacher, journalist, writer, newspaper editor

Friedrich Schrader (19 November 1865 – 28 August 1922) was a German philologist of oriental languages, orientalist, art historian, writer, social democrat, translator and journalist. He also used the pseudonym Ischtiraki (Arabic/Ottoman for "the socialist"). He lived from 1891 until 1918 in Istanbul.

== Life ==
=== Studies in Magdeburg and Halle (1865–1891) ===
Born in Wolmirstedt, Prussia, Friedrich Schrader passed his Abitur at the Domgymnasium Magdeburg. After studies of Oriental Languages and art history at the University of Halle he wrote his Ph. D. thesis on a translation of the "Karmapradipa" (an important Vedic sutra) into German. The work was done under the supervision of Professor Richard Pischel, at that time the most eminent scholar on vedic languages.

=== Teacher in Constantinople (1891–1907) ===
In 1891 Schrader took a position as a lecturer for German language and literature at Robert College in Bebek, close to Constantinople, where he lived with his family on the campus. Around 1900 he was "professeur" at a French-Armenian lycée in Pera, the European quarter of Constantinople (today Istanbul-Beyoğlu). Starting from the reign of Sultan Abdul Hamid II, Schrader began to translate contemporary Turkish literature and to write articles about it in German journals and newspapers such as Das Literarische Echo and Frankfurter Zeitung.

==== Beginnings as a journalist ====
From 1900, Schrader worked as a foreign correspondent for different German newspapers and journals. In the same period he published several articles in the official newspaper of the German SPD (Social Democratic Party), Vorwärts and in the theoretical journal of the party, Die Neue Zeit. In the articles, which he published under the pseudonym "Ischtiraki", he strongly criticized the official German policy in the Ottoman Empire, especially the focus on exploitation of economic and military-strategic interests while neglecting cultural exchange between the two nations and not engaging in the development of a modern civil society in the Ottoman Empire.

=== 1907-1917 (Second Constitutional Era) ===
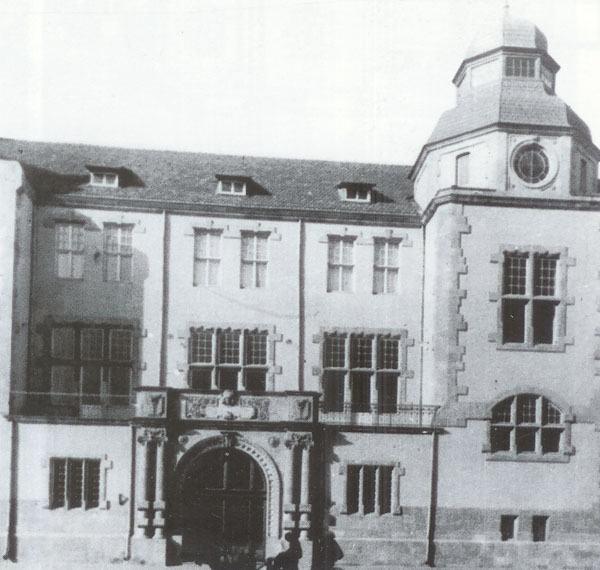
The Russian Commercial College in Baku, where Schrader taught from 1907 until 1908

From 1907 until 1908 Schrader worked as a lecturer at the Russian Commercial College in Baku, and undertook field studies in the Caucasus region. One of his research topics were the Persian temples close to Baku located at natural gas sources, which are used for ritual flames.

In 1908-1917 Schrader, after the Ottoman revolution of 1908, returned to Constantinople and became, after some failed attempts to found a bilingual Turkish-German newspaper with Young Turkish friends (because the Turkish parts had to be printed with Arabic letters, the production costs became too high), co-founder and deputy Editor-in-chief for the bilingual (French-German) Constantinople-based daily newspaper Osmanischer Lloyd (French title Lloyd Ottoman). The paper was co-financed by the consortium running the Baghdad Railway project, the German Foreign Office, and the Berlin-based Bleichröder Bank. Schrader's feuilleton contributions about literature, arts, monuments and history of Constantinople were re-printed in many leading German daily newspapers (Frankfurter Zeitung, Kölnische Zeitung, Magdeburgische Zeitung), being collected in 1917 in the book Konstantinopel in Vergangenheit und Gegenwart.

Starting from 1908, Schrader lived with his second wife, who had Bulgarian Sephardic background and was raised in the Anglican Orphanage for Jewish girls in Istanbul-Ortakoy (operated by the London Jew's Society), and his three sons in an apartment in the Dogan Apartmani in Beyoğlu.

In a letter to the headquarters of the World Zionist Organization in Berlin, Richard Lichtheim, the WZO representative in Constantinople in 1913-17 wrote in November 1913:

"Dr Schrader is a remarkable "Mensch", who might be useful for us. I visited him privately yesterday, and want to report some details about the conversation with him, since he is valuable for our political relations. Dr Schrader lives in Constantinople since 20 years and has been since the foundation of "Osmanischer Lloyd" the columnist of that paper. He claims that the (German) embassy here (in Constantinople) as well as the German "Auswärtiges Amt" (Foreign Office) were quite anti-semitic and didn't have any understanding of the importance of the Jews in the Orient for the German Cause (das Deutschtum).

(According to Schrader, )The former ambassador Marschall von Bieberstein had this understanding, the current ambassador von Wangenheim is an insignificant person, with whom also the German businesspeople were not satisfied, since he didn't show any understanding for their interests.

[...] Dr Schrader expressed himself with great sharpness, and even if he is exaggerating because of some personal causes ( he is very democratic and pro-Jewish, his wife is Spaniolic and baptized as a small child ) his opinion is quite remarkable, since he should especially know this question well regarding his position and his experience. I will keep in touch with him."

— Richard Lichtheim an das Zionistische Aktionskommittee in Berlin, 13.11.1913

In 1916 and 1917, when the policy of the Young Turks regarding ethnic minorities became increasingly evident, also tensions rose within the German community regarding the relation to the Turkish leadership. A Swiss colleague at the newspaper and younger mentee of Schrader, Max Rudolf Kaufmann, who shared Schrader's critical views on the German Turkish alliance, was arrested by the Turkish authorities after some of his letters home had been opened by Turkish intelligence, deported to Ankara, and later sent back to Germany, where he however was hired by Eugen Mittwoch for his Nachrichtenstelle für den Orient.

In 1917 Schrader himself was fired from his post as deputy editor at the Osmanischer Lloyd. To get rid of him, his opponents used an internal conflict with his editor-in-chief, Max Übelhör. Because of Schrader's eminent network in Istanbul and his profound knowledge, he was regarded however indispensable for the paper and continued to work as a freelancer for them until November, 1918.

Schrader was a fierce critic of the destruction of the multi-cultural Ottoman society and culture by competing ethnic nationalist ideologies, largely promoted by European intellectuals. He wrote in 1919

Also abroad, we must not, as we have done so far, always stick to the party, which pursues the rape of important cultural elements on behalf of its own national hegemony. This will always take revenge, like it has taken revenge in Turkey. We should not have been "more Turkish than the Turk".

— Friedrich Schrader, Flüchtlingsreise, 1919

=== Expert for the protection of monuments in Istanbul (1917–1918) ===
After 1917, Schrader could now focus on his historical and architectural interests. He published the book "Konstantinopel in Vergangenheit und Gegenwart" in 1917 in Tübingen, Germany. In parallel, he became a member of the Constantinople Municipal Commission for the Registration and Listing of Islamic and Byzantine monuments (which included the well-known Armenian photographer Hagop Iskender, at that time owner of the photography company Sabah and Joaillier. With a team of Turkish experts Schrader systematically catalogized monuments in the city threatened by the impact of war activities. Using archeological investigations, research, and interviews with locals, information about the monuments was systematically gathered, while the monuments were photographed by Iskender. Valuable artefacts were recovered and preserved in the Archeological Museum of the city. The work remained unfinished since Schrader was forced to leave Constantinople after the German-Ottoman capitulation in November 1918.

In 1919, Schrader published a brief summary of the activities in a German journal, the whereabouts of the recorded and collected material is unknown.

=== Journalist in Berlin (1919–1922) ===
In 1918–19 Schrader escaped from internment by the Allies by ship to Odessa. He left his ill wife and a male child in Constantinople. Since she was member of the Church of England (see remarks above), she was protected from deportation by the Canon of the Archbishop of Canterbury in Constantinople, Rev. Frew. His two older sons, who were serving in the German-Turkish navy, were both demobilized to Germany. From Odessa Friedrich travelled in a railroad freight car through the war-ravaged Ukraine to Brest-Litovsk, where he reached the German front line. In his diary, published in Germany in 1919, he described several dangerous situations in connection with the various civil war factions, but also the very warm reception and strong support the refugees receive by the local Jewish population.

In Berlin, Schrader tried in vain to obtain employment in academia or diplomacy. From 1919 to 1920 he worked for the SPD-owned theoretical journal Die Neue Zeit, which had been the internationally most important Socialist and Marxist publication since the 1880s. In several articles Schrader voiced his criticism of the failed German Middle East policies before and during the First World War, especially in relation with the support for the Young Turkish regime and its attitude towards non-Muslim minorities. In an article published in 1920, Die Ägyptische Frage ("The Egyptian Question"), Schrader warned about possibly fateful and negative results of the Anglo-French colonial politics in the former Ottoman provinces Egypt, Palestine and Syria after World War I.

Schrader spent the last two years of his life in Berlin as freelance journalist, mainly writing for Deutsche Allgemeine Zeitung (DAZ), which was in the early years of the Weimar Republic still a centre-right publication supporting the consolidation of Germany in the Weimar Republic (the foreign policy editor and later editor in chief at that time was Paul Lensch, a former SPD politician and associate of Parvus and Rosa Luxemburg).

Schrader died in August 1922 in Berlin, few weeks after DAZ had published his historic novel Im Banne von Byzanz.

== Works ==
- Konstantinopel in Vergangenheit und Gegenwart (1917) ("Constantinople - Past and Present")
  - translated into Turkish and re-published by Remzi Kitabevi in 2015: ISBN 978-975-14-1675-9 )
- Eine Flüchtlingsreise durch die Ukraine - Tagebuchblätter meiner Flucht aus Konstantinopel (1919) ("A refugee voyage through Ukraine - diary of my flight from Constantinople")
- Im Banne von Byzanz (1922, novel, published in "Deutsche Allgemeine Zeitung") ("Mesmerized by Byzantium")

=== Selected journal articles ===
- Neutürkisches Schrifttum: Das Literarische Echo, Band 3, 1900, S. 1686-1690
- Ischtiraki, 1900, Das geistige Leben in der Türkei und das jetzige Regime: Die Neue Zeit, Jahrgang 18, Band 2, pp. 548–555
- Ischtiraki, 1900, Vom Goldenen Horn: Vorwärts, Unterhaltungsbeilage, 31. Mai 1900 – 1. Juni 1900
- Die Kunstdenkmäler Konstantinopels: Der Neue Orient, 1919, Band 5, S. 302-304 und 352-354
- Politisches Leben in der Türkei: Die Neue Zeit, 1919, Jahrgang 37, Band 2, pp. 460–466
- Das Handwerk bei den Osmanli-Türken: Die Neue Zeit, 1919, Jahrgang 38, Band 1, pp. 163–168
- Die Lage der ackerbauenden Klasse in der Türkei: Die Neue Zeit, 1920, Jahrgang 38, Band 1, pp. 317–319
- Das Jungtürkische Lausanner Programm: Die Neue Zeit, 1920, Jahrgang 38, Band 2, pp. 6–11, 31-35
- Die ägyptische Frage: Die Neue Zeit, 1920, Jahrgang 38, Band 2, pp. 172 – 177

== Sources ==
- Ceyda Nurtsch, 2018, One of Turkey's Germans: qantara.de, 22. June 2018, Link
- Martin Hartmann, 1910, Unpolitische Briefe aus der Türkei. Leipzig, Verlag Rudolf Haupt
- Otto Flake, 1914, "Aus Konstantinopel", in Neue Rundschau, 15. Jg., Bd. 2, S. 1666–1687 (reprinted in: Das Logbuch, S. Fischer Verlag, Frankfurt, 1917
- Max Rudolf Kaufmann, "Eine literarische Entdeckung – Schraders 'Konstantinopel'", in Mitteilungen der Deutsch-Türkischen Gesellschaft, Heft 17, 1957, S. 13-14 ISSN 0415-5289
- Çelik Gülersoy, Bibliographie: „Istanbul“ de Friedrich Schrader: Touring Et Automobile Club de Turquie: Janvier 1959, pp. 31–32
- N.N., "Nachruf auf Dr. Friedrich Schrader", Deutsche Allgemeine Zeitung, 30. August 1922
- And, Metin, Mesrutiyet Döneminde - Türk Tiyatrosu 1908-1923: Türkiye Is Bankasi Kültür Yayinlari - 108, Ankara, 1971 (in Turkish language, mentions a memorial event staged by Schrader in 1909 in Istanbul on the occasion of the 150th death anniversary of Friedrich Schiller)
