= Osmanischer Lloyd =

German language newspaper in the Ottoman Empire

The Osmanischer Lloyd was a German-Language daily newspaper in Ottoman Constantinople, founded after the Young Turk Revolution in 1908 and existed until 1918. Between 1908 and 1915, the newspaper was published as a bilingual outlet, with each issue having two pages containing French articles. From November 1915 onwards, there were two 4-page newspapers, one in German and another in French. The funding was provided by the German companies Krupp and Deutsche Bank.

== History ==
During its existence, it had six different chief editors, of whom E. M. Grunwald, who lasted the longest, from November 1908 to March 1914. Grunwald was dismissed following constant criticism by the German ambassador to the Ottoman Empire, Hans Freiherr von Wangenheim, over the newspaper's leadership. Notable contributors and staff members included Friedrich Schrader and Max Rudolf Kaufmann. The following editors in chief were not directing the newspaper to the satisfaction of the German embassy, and in 1918, the Osmanischer Lloyd was closed down. During the editorship of Grunwald, the Lloyds subscribers initially rose from 324 to 506 between 1908 and 1911, and then fell again to 349. After the outbreak of World War I, the number of subscribers grew by 140. Aside from subscribers, the newspaper was sold to the public, and this number grew constantly from 836 papers sold in November 1908 to 1555 in July 1914, and during the years of war, the newspaper sold up to 6700 newspapers in 1915, 8000 in 1916, and 9885 in 1917. In a report by the chief editor, Friedrich Schrader, in 1915, the readership amount of the French edition was presented as being competitive, when compared to other Ottoman newspapers in the French language, as it sold 1800 editions daily.

== Content ==
On its first page, it published official announcements by the German embassy and articles and opinions concerning the German-Ottoman relations. Ottoman governmental announcements were also published on page one. On page two, there were often published translations of articles from the regional press and news provided by the German diplomatic staff or employees in German companies in the Ottoman provinces. In the French edition, translations of the German articles were usually published. The newspaper was also confronted with a strong opposition by the Ottoman press to German influence, which led to disputes with other newspapers, each presenting its article as the correct view.
