= Former German embassy building, Istanbul =

Historic building in Istanbul

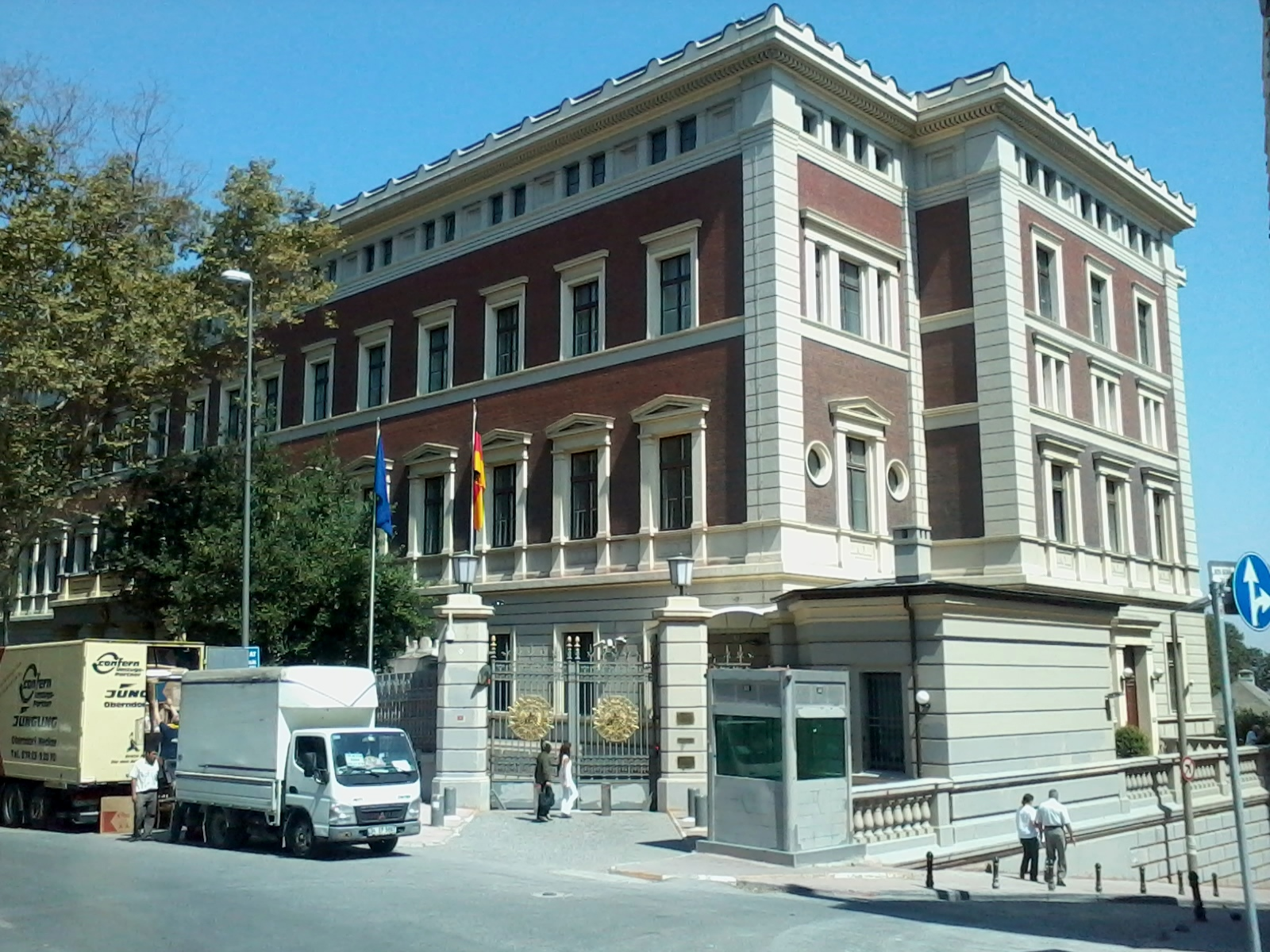
Former German embassy building, photographed in 2013

The Former German embassy building is a historic property in the Beyoğlu (formerly Pera) neighborhood of Istanbul, Turkey. From the 1870s to the 1920s, it has been the seat of diplomatic missions of the German Empire to the Ottoman Empire. Following the latter's abolition in 1922 and subsequent relocation of the German embassy to the new capital of Ankara, the building has served as the Swedish consulate-general in Istanbul, as well as a residence for the ambassador when in town.

The building was the first diplomatic building built for that purpose by a unified Germany.

== History ==
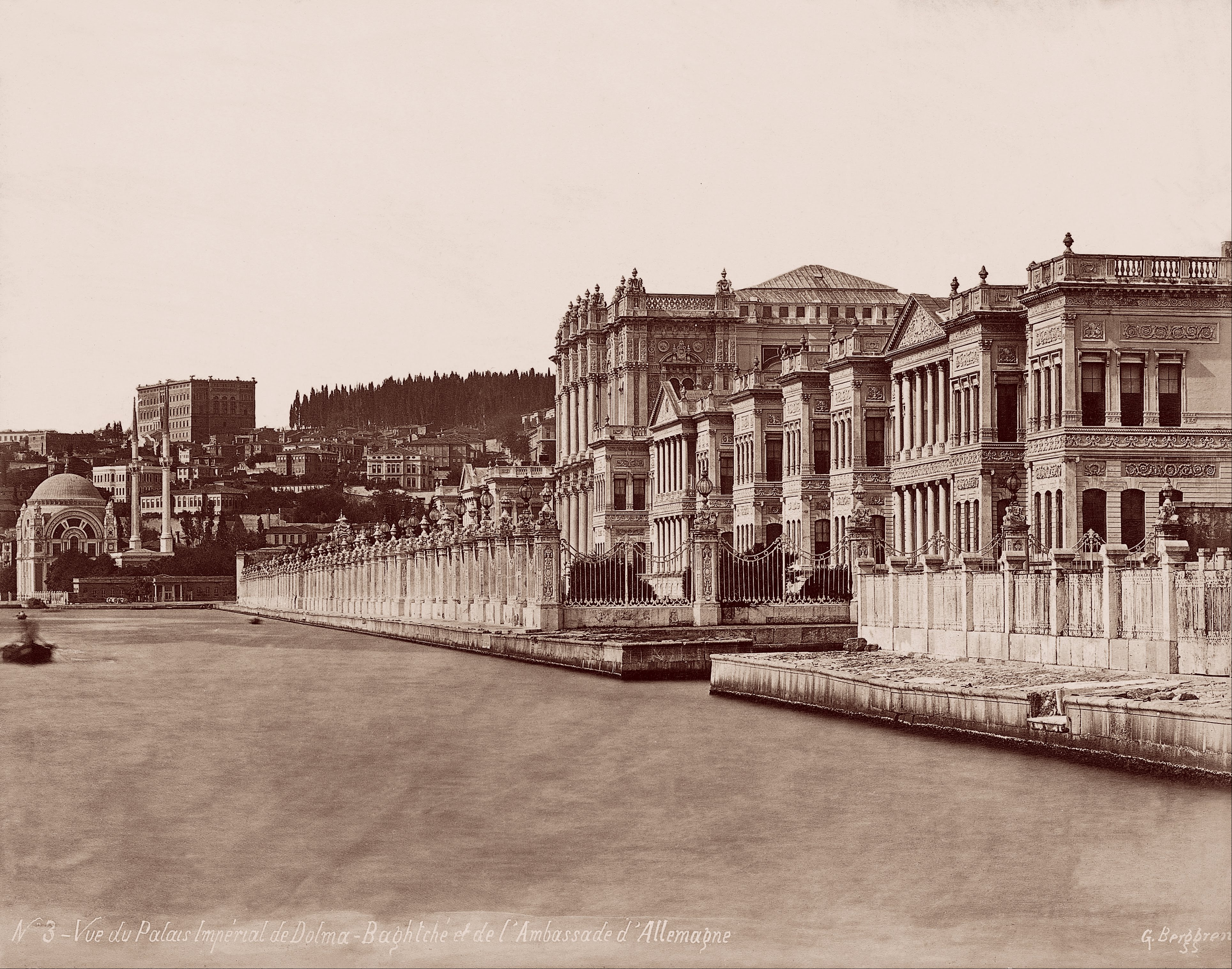
The hilltop German embassy building (left) in the late 19th century, with Dolmabahçe Palace in the foreground

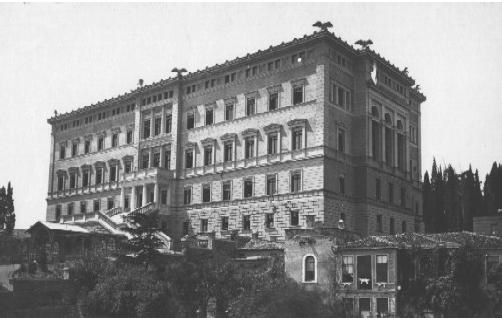
The building in the mid-1910s, with decorative eagles still on the roof

After the founding of the German Empire in 1871, the imperial authorities decided to establish an embassy in Constantinople. The Ottoman authorities offered several plots of land for its construction, including part of a former cemetery outside the city center near Taksim Square. On 15 May 1874, despite protests from the local population, Germany finalized its purchase of the approximately 10,000 m^{2} plot for 95,015 thalers. The sultan stipulated that the tomb of Silahdar Ali Paşa on the location be preserved and maintained, which it has been ever since.

The building was designed by architect Hubert Goebbels, originally for another site, replaced shortly after his death with Albert Kortüm on 4 December 1874. It featured stone Prussian eagles on its roof, giving the building a distinct character, different from the original plans to incorporate the coats of arms of the German states on the roof. A stable and a carriage house were also located on the embassy grounds. The interior was decorated in the Neo-Renaissance style and featured red wallpaper and stucco decorations. The first ambassador, Prince Henry VII of Reuss, furnished the rooms according to his own selection, but some rooms remained empty due to limited funds.

Reuss inaugurated the building on 1 December 1877. It had a floor area of almost 10,000 m^{2}, providing office space for around 80 embassy staff. Over the next three decades, relations between Germany and the Ottoman Empire expanded considerably. From 1908 to 1918, the German-language newspaper Osmanischer Lloyd was published at the embassy's request. Kaiser Wilhelm II first visited Constantinople in 1889, and again in 1898 when he watched part of a naval review on the Bosporus from the embassy's observation terrace. His third and final trip to the city took place in 1917 to bolster his World War I alliance with Ottoman Turkey.

Through the armistice of Mudros, the Entente powers brought about the termination of German-Turkish relations. The Swedish legation, as protecting power, assumed responsibility for the building in addition to its own Palais de Suède. Around that time, the eagles on the roof were removed, and have not been replaced since then. Relations with the German Empire were then re-established by Atatürk, and Germany relocated its embassy in Ankara in 1928. On 4 June 1931, the German diplomatic mission in Istanbul resumed its work as a consulate-general.

At the behest of the Allies, Turkey again broke its relations with Nazi Germany in 1944, towards the end of World War II. This time, Switzerland assumed the role of protecting power. After the Federal Republic of Germany was founded in 1949, the Consulate General reopened on 24 October 1950, one of the new state's first foreign missions. Until 1953, operations were conducted in rented premises in Üsküdar, then the Istanbul authorities returned the embassy building to the German state. In 1954, Konrad Adenauer visited the Consulate General during a visit to Turkey.

A comprehensive renovation took place between 1983 and 1989, during which the facade, windows and doors, and stucco ceilings were faithfully restored. The parquet floors in the Imperial Hall and the salons were also renewed. Since 1989, the building has also housed the Istanbul branch of the German Archaeological Institute.

On September 10, 2001, a supporter of the banned underground organization DHKP-C carried out a suicide bombing outside the German Consulate General in Istanbul. Two Turkish police officers were killed and 20 people were injured.

== Tarabya Summer Residence ==
In 1880, Abdul Hamid II gifted the German embassy a plot of land in the upscale villa district of Tarabya on the Bosporus, for a summer residence to be built. On 4 February 1885, the Reichstag approved the plans and ordered that the financing be secured through the sale of the former Prussian legation building. French architect Alphonse Cingria had already made designs for it in 1882, which were then significantly altered by Wilhelm Dörpfeld. The summer residence was built between 1885 and 1887.

In 1915, a military cemetery was established in the approximately 18-hectare park, where Ambassador Hans von Wangenheim (1915) and military commander Colmar Freiherr von der Goltz (1916) were buried. From 1917 onwards, the artistic design of the cemetery was overseen by the sculptor Georg Kolbe, who also created the sculpture of the memorial.

The summer residence has recently been used by the consulate-general as a place for German-Turkish dialogue and for cultural and political events. In addition, the large property contains several other buildings, including an ecumenical chapel and the former sailors' house of the crew of the SMY Hohenzollern, which now houses a memorial to the fallen of both World Wars.

== See also ==
- Eastern question
- List of ambassadors of Germany to Turkey
- List of diplomatic missions of Germany
