= Roland Carter =

Australian Ngarrindjeri soldier and community leader

- Born: 28 February 1892; Raukkan, South Australia, British Empire
- Died: 2 July 1960 (aged 68)
- Allegiance: Australia
- Service years: 1915-1917

Roland Winzel Carter (28 February 1892 – 2 July 1960) was an Indigenous Australian who was born in Raukkan, South Australia, and was the first of the Ngarrindjeri people to enlist in the First Australian Imperial Force to fight in World War I.

Carter was wounded and captured during combat at Noreuil in northern France on 2 April 1917. He was initially held as a prisoner of war at Zerbst in the German Empire and later at the Halbmondlager POW camp where he and Douglas Grant were the only Australian aboriginal soldiers in a camp intended principally for the holding of Moslem prisoners of war.

Following the war, Carter was repatriated to England and then to South Australia where he returned to Raukkan where he lived until his death.
