= Deutsche Allgemeine Zeitung =

Periodical literature

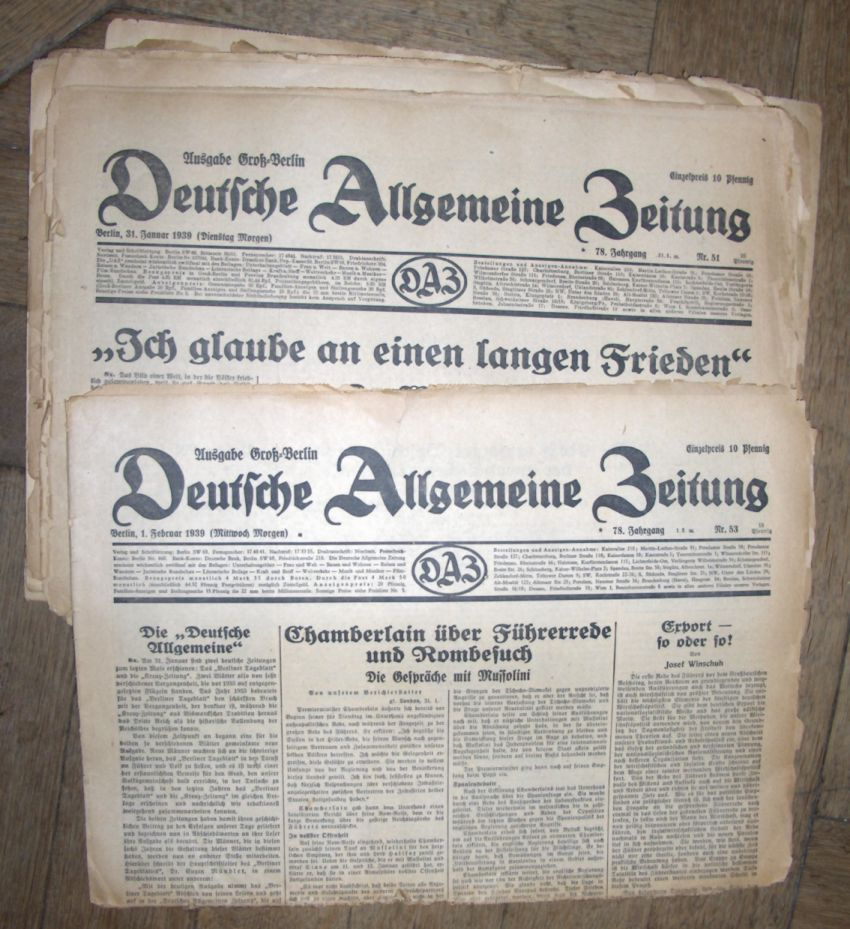
DAZ editions of 1939

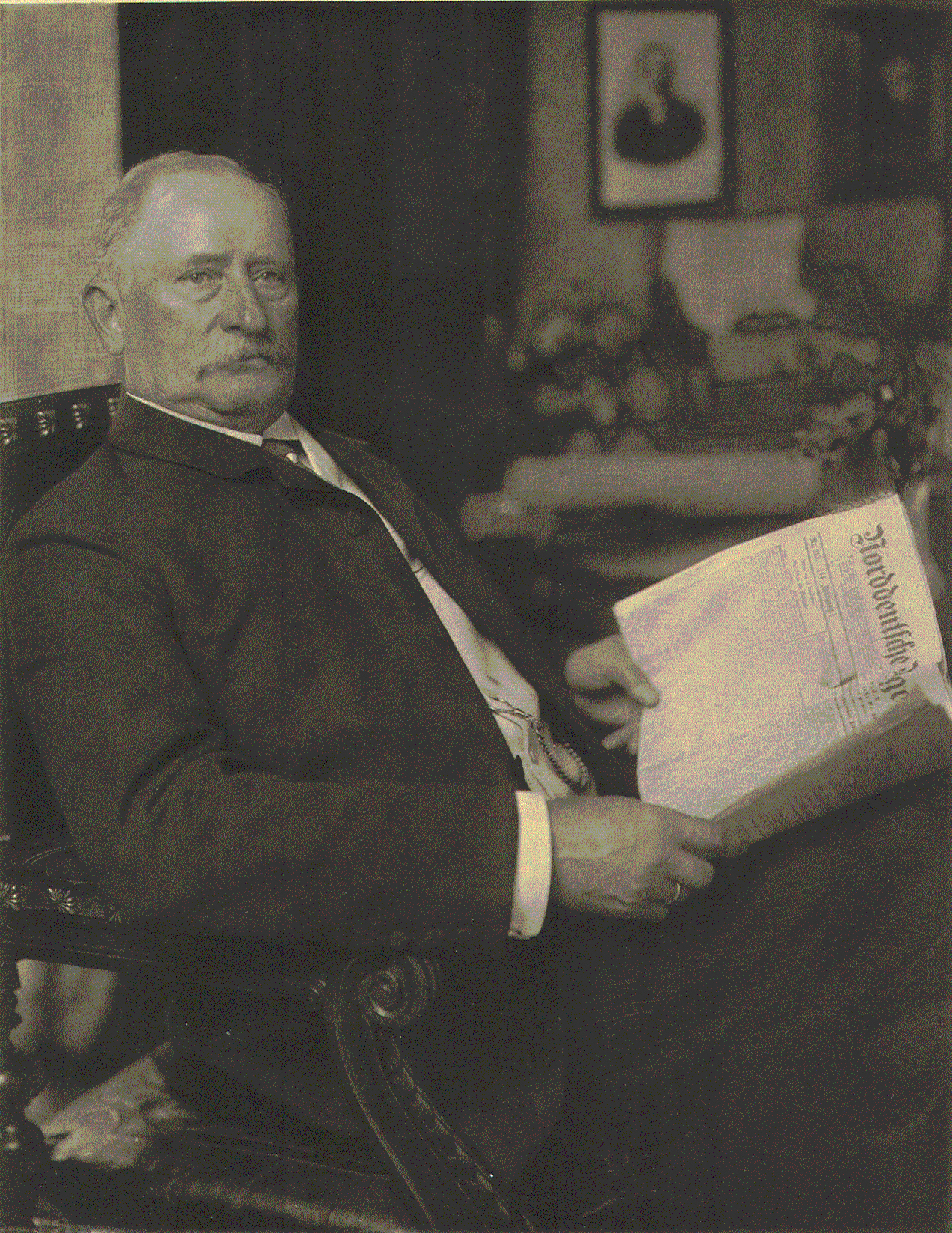
Heinrich von Ohlendorff with Norddeutsche Allgemeine Zeitung

Deutsche Allgemeine Zeitung (German: [ˈdɔʏtʃə ʔalɡemaɪnə ˈtsaɪtʊŋ]; often abbreviated to DAZ; English: German General Newspaper) was a German newspaper published between 1861 and 1945.

Until 1918, the name of the paper was Norddeutsche Allgemeine Zeitung (English: North German General Newspaper).

Although Wilhelm Liebknecht, one of the founders of the Social Democratic Party of Germany and a close associate of Karl Marx and Friedrich Engels, was a member of the founding editorial board in 1861, the paper soon became a conservative flagship of the German press ("Bismarcks Hauspostille"). At the end of World War I, the name was changed to "Deutsche Allgemeine Zeitung", under the intention to form a conservative and democratic equivalent to the British newspaper The Times in Germany and give the Reich a more democratic image. Various liberal and conservative writers worked for DAZ at that time; Otto Flake was head of the Cultural Section (called "Feuilleton" in German newspapers); the historian Egmont Zechlin, the journalist Friedrich Schrader and his Swiss colleague Max Rudolf Kaufmann from Constantinople worked for the paper.

In the early 1920s, Hans Humann controlled the newspaper, which repeatedly denied and justified the Armenian genocide. Following the assassination of Talat Pasha in March 1921 the newspaper launched an aggressive anti-Armenian campaign, claiming in one article that murder and backstabbing was "the true Armenian manner".

Hugo Stinnes took over the DAZ in 1920 in an effort to secure industrialist influence. Stinnes invested in the newspaper, and it enjoyed a short period of financial success. The DAZ became increasingly conservative. Paul Lensch, a former left-wing socialist associated with Rosa Luxemburg, later during the war part of the right wing "Lensch-Cunow-Haenisch-Gruppe" within the SPD (itself associated with and financed by the German-Russian-Jewish socialist Alexander Parvus), became foreign policy editor and later editor in chief of DAZ, which he edited until his death in 1926. After the death of Lensch, until the paper became a conservative supporter of the Weimar coalition (Stinnes was associated with Gustav Stresemann and his DVP), the paper became, like the DVP itself, increasingly right-wing and closer to the Hugenberg Press and anti-democratic right-wing circles. After Stinnes' (and Lensch's) death, the Prussian government secretly bought the DAZ in 1925. Less than a year later, the Reich government took it over, but it was sold again when the affair came to light.

By 1930, the DAZ had declined and was suffering large losses.
