= Guido Goldman =

American academic and philanthropist (1937–2020)

- Born: November 4, 1937; Zürich, Switzerland
- Died: November 30, 2020 (aged 83); Concord, Massachusetts, US
- Occupation(s): Academic and philanthropist
- Organization(s): German Marshall Fund; Center for European Studies, Harvard University
- Known for: Advancing post World War II US – German academic and cultural relations
- Parents: Nahum Goldman (father); Alice Gottschalk (mother)

Guido Goldman (November 4, 1937 – November 30, 2020) was a Swiss-born American academic and philanthropist known for advancing post–World War II US-Germany academic and cultural relations. He was a co-founder of the German Marshall Fund and also set up the Center for European Studies at Harvard University.

== Early life ==
Goldman was born in Zürich, Switzerland, on November 4, 1937, to Alice (née Gottschalk) and Nahum Goldmann. His father was a leader in the Zionist Movement, and a co-founder of the World Jewish Congress. His mother, Alice, was a painter and heiress to a family fortune. His family fled Berlin after they received a tip that the Gestapo had searched his father's office. The family moved to New York in 1940 fleeing Nazi persecution. He grew up on the Upper West Side. His family was well connected and hosted with world leaders and artists at their home, including German Chancellor Konrad Adenauer, Polish-American classical pianist Arthur Rubinstein and First Lady Eleanor Roosevelt. His father, in his role as the president of the World Zionist Organization, was a champion for Israeli independence at the United Nations and was an inspiration for Goldman to champion civil rights activism through the 1960s and 1970s.

== Career ==
Goldman graduated with a degree in government studies at Harvard University, and obtained a doctorate from the same university. During his time at the university, he is noted to have had future Secretary of State Henry Kissinger as his mentor. This relationship would grow in the years to come, with Kissinger describing it as a "father-son relationship". Goldman went on to be Kissinger's confidant, serving as a link between the US and German politicians during his frequent trips to West Germany.

Goldman furthered cultural and academic relations between post–World War II USA and Germany. He set up the Minda de Gunzburg Center for European Studies at Harvard University along with Henry Kissinger and Stanley Hoffmann, and was also the director of the Program for the Study of Germany at the same university.

He also set up the German Marshall Fund, a policy think tank focused on furthering relations between US and Germany. The organization was set up when the West German government had sought his advice on commemorating the 25th anniversary of the Marshall Plan, the US led financial reconstruction plan for Europe post World War II. He had laid out the foundational blueprint of the think tank and became its founding president. He remained chairman of the board for forty years. He notably persuaded the then chancellor, Willy Brandt to financially endow the fund with a foundational grant in 1972.

Building on his inheritance from his mother's side, he was a real-estate investor and a private investment manager in the 1970s and 1980s. He contributed to children's rights activist Marian Wright Edelman who was the founder of the Children's Defense Fund, and other civil rights activists including Harry Belafonte.

He was the recipient of the Commander's Cross of the Order of Merit by the Federal Republic of Germany in 1978 for his contributions towards advancing US-German relations.

== Positions ==
Sources:

- Co-founder and director, Minda de Gunzburg Center for European Studies (CES), Harvard University
- Founding chair and chairman of the board, German Marshall Fund
- Director, Program for the Study of Germany and Europe, CES, Harvard University
- Senior fellow and faculty associate, CES, Harvard University

== Personal life ==
Goldman remained a bachelor for life. He died on November 30, 2020, at his house in Concord, Massachusetts, at the age of 83.
