= Eduard Sachau =

German orientalist (1845–1930)

C. Eduard Sachau
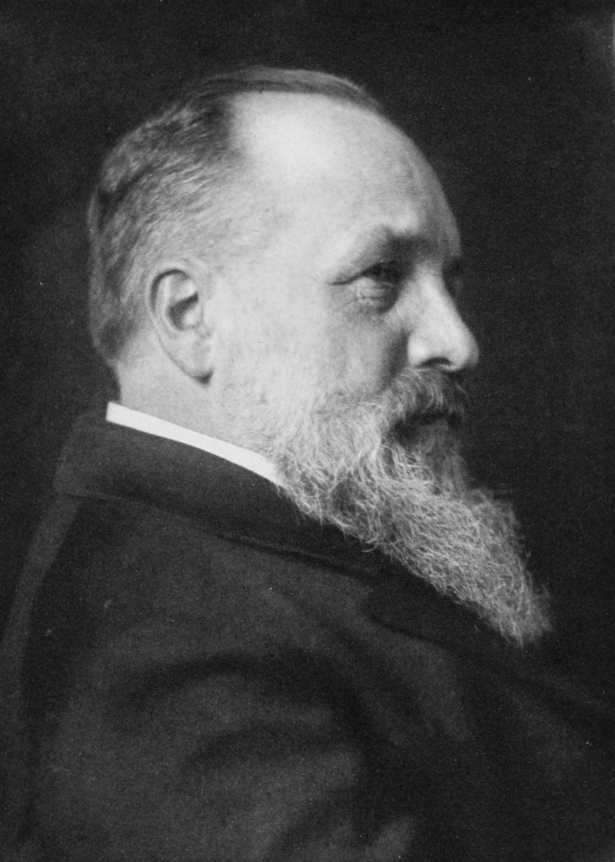
- Born: 20 July 1845; Neumünster, Holstein, German Confederation
- Died: 17 September 1930 (aged 85); Berlin, Prussia, Weimar Republic
- Scientific career
- Fields: Oriental studies
- Notable students: Josef Horovitz; Eugen Mittwoch

Carl Eduard Sachau (20 July 1845 – 17 September 1930) was a German orientalist. He taught Josef Horovitz and Eugen Mittwoch.

== Biography ==
He studied oriental languages at the Universities of Kiel and Leipzig, obtaining his PhD at Halle in 1867. Sachau became a professor extraordinary of Semitic philology (1869) and a full professor (1872) at the University of Vienna, and in 1876, a professor at the University of Berlin, where he was appointed director of the new Seminar of Oriental languages (1887).

Sachau travelled to the Near East on several occasions (see his book Reise in Syrien und Mesopotamien, published 1883) and became known for his work on Syriac and other Aramaic dialects. He was an expert on polymath Al-Biruni and wrote a translation of Kitab ta'rikh al-Hind, Al-Biruni's encyclopedic work on India. Sachau also wrote papers on Ibadi Islam.

While a student at Kiel, he became part of the fraternity Teutonia Kiel (1864). He was a member of the Vienna and the Prussian Academy of Sciences, and an honorary member of the Royal Asiatic Society in London and the American Oriental Society. He worked as a consultant in the planning and construction of the Baghdad Railway. Among his better known students was Eugen Mittwoch, a founder of modern Islamic studies in Germany.

He received the honorary degree Doctor of Letters (D.Litt.) from the University of Oxford in October 1902, in connection with the tercentenary of the Bodleian Library.

== Bibliography ==
- Inedita Syriaca. Eine Sammlung syrischer Übersetzungen von Schriften griechischer Profanliteratur, 1870 – A collection of Syriac translations of writings from Greek secular literature.
- Chronologie orientalischer Völker, 1878, English translation. Chronology of Ancient Nations, 1879 – Translation of Abū l-Rayḥān al-Bīrūnī's al-Āthār al-bāqiya ʿan al-qurūn al-ḫāliya (Vestiges of the Past, 1000).
- Reise in Syrien und Mesopotamien, Leipzig, F.A. Brockhaus, 1883 – Journey to Syria and Mesopotamia.
- Muhammedanisches Recht nach schafiitischer Lehre, Stuttgart, Berlin, W. Spemann, 1897 – Islamic law according to Shafi'i doctrine. German translation and explanation of Mukhtasar Abī Shujāʿ according to Ibrāhīm al-Bājūrī with the original Arabic text.
- Am Euphrat und Tigris : Reisenotizen aus dem Winter 1897-1898, Leipzig : J.C. Hinrichs, 1900 – The Euphrates and Tigris, travelogue in the winter of 1897–1898.
- "Three Aramaic Papyri from Elephantine, Egypt" in Smithsonian Institution Annual Report (1907): 605–11. [Translated and abstracted, by permission, from Drei Aramäische Papyrusurkunden aus Elephantine by Eduard Sachau in the Abhandlungen der Königlich Preußischen Akademie der Wissenschaften for the year 1907.]
- Alberuni's India. An account of the religion, philosophy, literature, geography, chronology, astronomy, customs, laws and astrology of India about A.D. 1030, (published in English) London, K. Paul, Trench, Trübner & Co., 1910.
- Die Chronik von Arbela, ein Beitrag zur Kenntnis des ältesten Christentums im Orient, Berlin, Verlag der Königlichen Akademie der Wissenschaften, in Kommission bei Georg Reimer, 1915 – The chronicle of Arbela, a contribution to the knowledge of the oldest Christianity in the Orient.
- Arabische Erzählungen aus der Zeit der Kalifen, München: Hyperionverlag, 1920 – Arabic tales from the time of the Caliphs.

== Papers related to Ibadism ==
- Sachau, Eduard: (1894) Muhammedanisches Erbrecht nach der Lehre der ibaditischen Araber von Zanzibar und Ostafrika. Sitzungsberichte der Königlich Preussischen Akademie der Wissenschaften zu Berlin, VIII (1894), 159–210.
- Sachau, Eduard: (1898a) [Yaḥyà ibn Khalfān al-Kharūṣi] Das Gutachten eines muhammedanischen Juristen über die muhammedanischen Rechtsverhältnisse in Ost-Afrika. Mitteilungen des Seminars für Orientalische Sprachen an der königlichen Friedrich Wilhelms- Universität zu Berlin, Jahrgang I (1898), Abt. III, 1–8.
- Sachau, Eduard: (1898b) Über eine arabische Chronik aus Zanzibar. Mittheilungen des Seminars für Orientalische Sprachen an der königlichen Friedrich Wilhelms-Universität zu Berlin, Westasiatische Studien (Berlin), I. Band, Abtheilung 2 (1898), 1-19.
- Sachau, Eduard: (1899) Über die religiösen Anschauungen der ibadhitischen Muhammedaner in Oman und Ostafrika. Mittheilungen des Seminars für Orientalische Sprachen an der königlichen Friedrich Wilhelms-Universität zu Berlin, Westasiatische Studien (Berlin), Band II, 2. Abtheilung (1899) 47–82.
