= Mosque of the Bois de Vincennes =

Former mosque in Paris, in France

- French: Mosquée du Bois de Vincennes
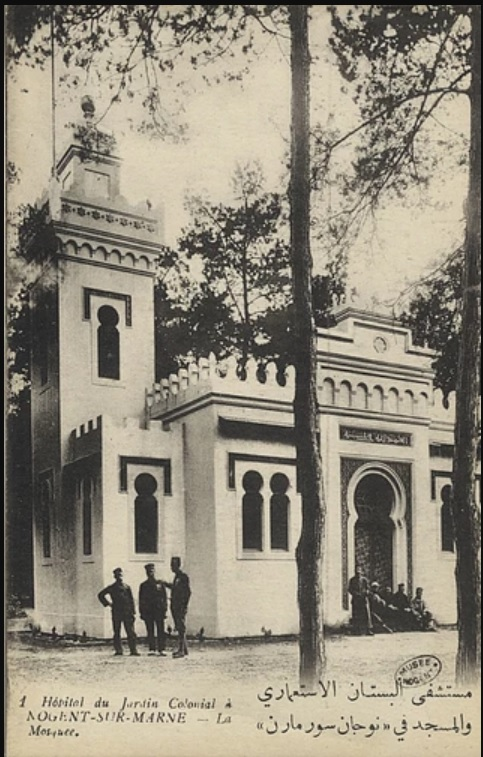
- Bilingual postcard picturing the former mosque with soldiers, 1916

- Location of the former mosque in greater Paris

Religion
- Affiliation: Islam (former)
- Ecclesiastical or organisational status: Mosque (1916–1926)
- Year consecrated: April 13, 1916
- Status: Destroyed

Location
- Location: Bois de Vincennes, Paris
- Country: France
- Coordinates: 48°49′42″N 2°25′59″E

Architecture
- Architect: M. Péni
- Type: Mosque architecture
- Completed: 1916
- Demolished: 1926

The Mosque of the Bois de Vincennes (French: Mosquée du Bois de Vincennes), also known as the Mosque of the Colonial Garden Hospital or Nogent Mosque, was a former Islamic mosque, located in the grounds of the Bois de Vincennes, in greater Paris, France. It was the first mosque built on the French mainland since the Umayyad invasion of Gaul in the 8th century and the conversion of the Toulon Cathedral by the Ottomans.

The mosque was constructed in early 1916 on the grounds of the Bois de Vincennes, as a counterpropaganda project and to serve some of the Muslim soldiers who came to France during World War I. The mosque was destroyed just four years later, in 1920.

== Background ==
Mosques have long existed on French ground overseas, not least in Algeria which became legally part of the French territory when converted into three departments in 1848. In 1897, a mosque was also established in a private home in Réunion.

In 1899, a trial garden was created at the eastern end of the Bois de Vincennes to experiment with plants from the French colonial empire. Several pavilions were built there on the occasion of the colonial exhibition in May–October 1907.

During World War I, the Colonial Garden was repurposed as a hospital in late 1914. Between 1914 and May 1919, the hospital in the former Colonial Garden cared for nearly 5,000 wounded soldiers, mostly North African and Muslim. At that time, the Colonial Garden / war hospital was on the territory of the Nogent-sur-Marne municipality, from which it took its name (French: Hôpital du jardin colonial de Nogent-sur-Marne). These grounds were later transferred on 18 April 1929 to the 12th arrondissement of Paris together with the rest of the Bois de Vincennes.

== History of the mosque building ==
The decision to build a mosque on the hospital's grounds was made in reaction to German war propaganda that attempted to turn Muslims from the British and French colonies against their colonial rulers. The German Empire was allied with the Ottoman Empire, which claimed global leadership of Islam through its Custody of Mecca and Medina and Caliphate. This strategy was the brainchild of German Orientalist Max von Oppenheim who had published a "memorandum on bringing revolution to the Islamic lands of our enemies" (German: Denkschrift betreffend die Revolutionierung der islamischen Gebiete unserer Feinde) in October 1914. Von Oppenheim, whose nickname Abu Jihad was posthumously popularised by Wolfgang G. Schwanitz, was given charge of a newly created Intelligence Bureau for the East which sponsored the prisoner-of-war camp named "Half Moon" (Halbmondlager) in Zossen-Wünsdorf near Berlin.

As its name suggests, the Halbmondlager was specifically intended for Muslim soldiers from British and French colonies and included a monumental mosque, the first ever built in Germany, completed in July 1915. The German authorities distributed stories about the inappropriate treatment of Islam in the French military, illustrated with images of the Halbmondlager mosque.

In turn, the war imperative to demonstrate that France was friendly to Islam, against the German claims, broke the prior taboo against an Islamic place of worship (other than in cemeteries) on the French mainland. Diplomat Pierre de Margerie, then director of political affairs at the French Foreign Ministry, promoted the initiative to build the mosque and orchestrated the wide distribution of a picture of it by French agents in the Muslim world, even before the building had been completed.

=== Designs ===
The wooden mosque was swiftly erected on designs by the Colonial Garden's architect M. Péni and inaugurated on 14 April 1916 by Gaston Doumergue, then Minister of the Colonies. Dedication prayers were read by two imams, Bou-Mezrag El-Mokrani of Chlef (a descendant of Cheikh Mokrani) and Katranji Sid Abderrahman of Algiers.

Following the end of the war, the mosque was disaffected in 1919 and demolished in 1926, around the time when the Grand Mosque of Paris was inaugurated.

== Monuments ==
A number of commemorative monuments were erected nearby during the interwar period and dedicated to the memory of fallen soldiers from various French colonies, most of them non-Muslims. The former Colonial Garden is now known as the Jardin d'agronomie tropicale de Paris. Some of the pavilions and monuments have been renovated in the 2010s. A commemorative stone stele and explanatory panel perpetuate the memory of the former mosque on the site.

== Gallery ==
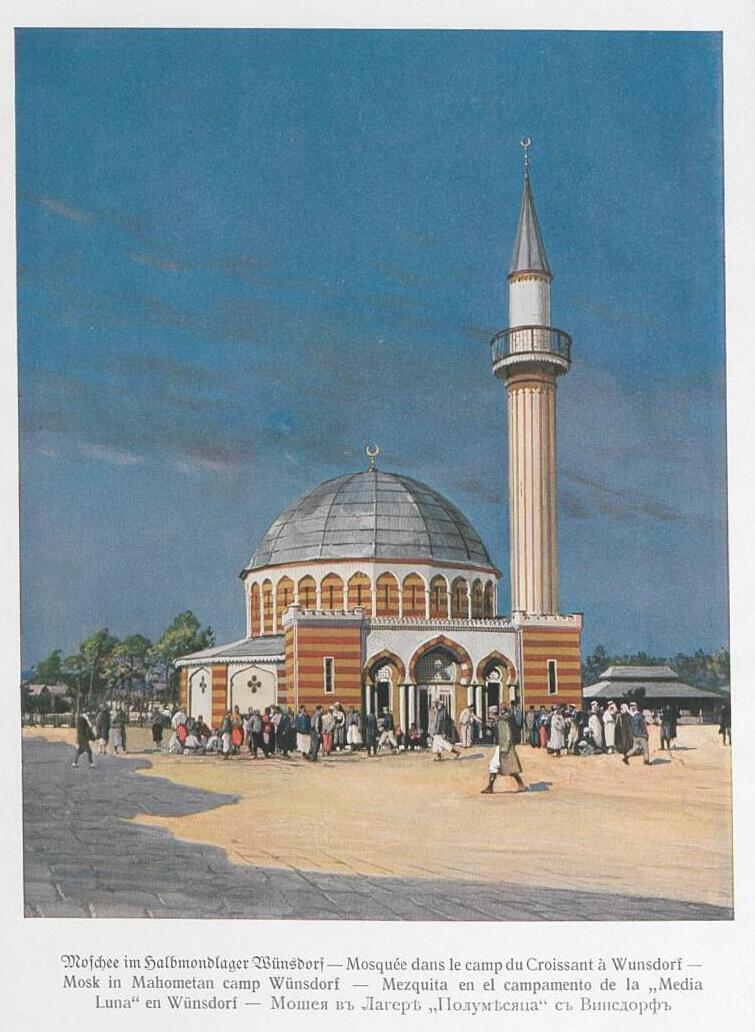
German propaganda image of the mosque in Halbmondlager near Berlin (1915)

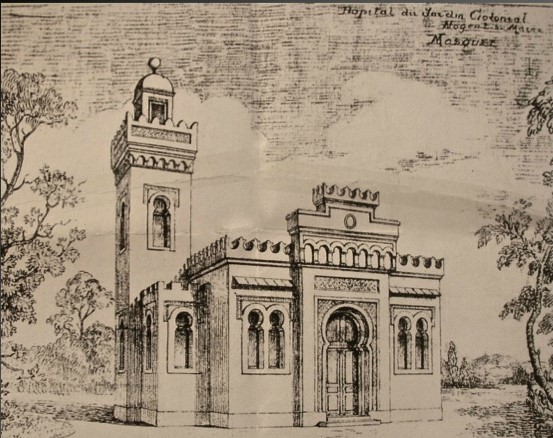
French propaganda image of the Mosque to be built in the Bois de Vincennes (late 1915)

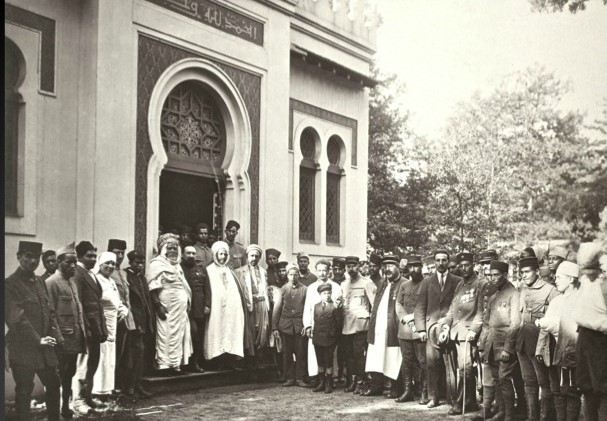
Gathering for the Eid al-Adha in front of the mosque on 16 September 1918

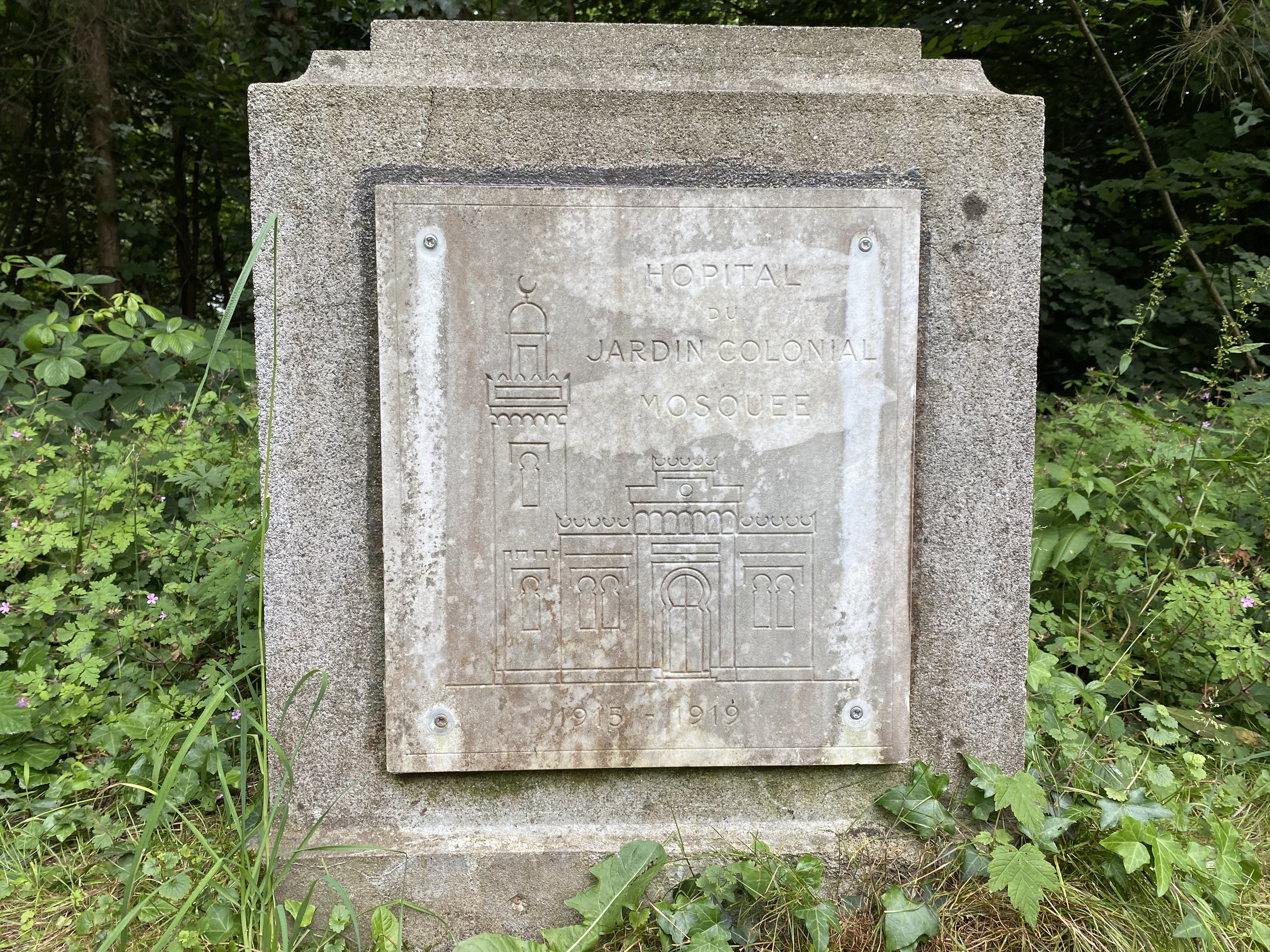
Stela commemorating the location of the mosque at the Jardin d'agronomie tropicale de Paris

== See also ==
- History of Islam in France
- List of mosques in France
- Si Kaddour Benghabrit
