= Nahum Goldmann =

Founder and president of the World Jewish Congress (1895–1982)

- נחום גולדמן
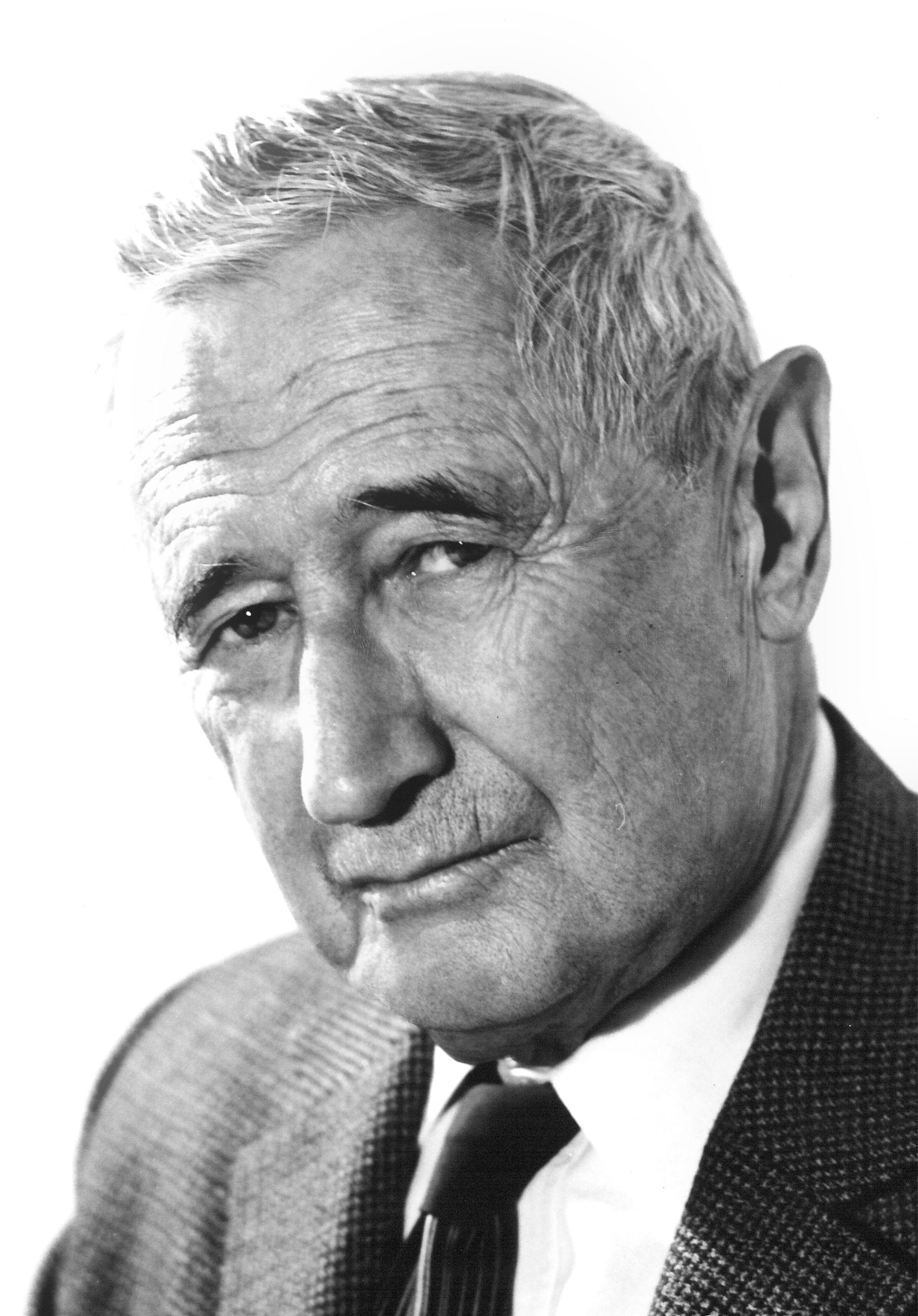
- Goldmann in 1972
- Born: July 10, 1895; Vishnevo, Russian Empire (now Vishnyeva, Belarus)
- Died: August 29, 1982 (aged 87); Bad Reichenhall, West Germany
- Known for: Founder and president of the World Jewish Congress

Nahum Goldmann (Hebrew: נחום גולדמן; July 10, 1895 – August 29, 1982) was a leading Zionist. He was a founder of the World Jewish Congress and its president from 1951 to 1978 and was also president of the World Zionist Organization from 1956 to 1968.

== Biography ==
Nahum Goldmann was born in Vishnevo, Russian Empire, a shtetl in the Pale of Settlement (now Vishnyeva, Belarus), the son of a teaching and writing Litvak family, whose father was an ardent Zionist. At the age of six, he moved with his parents to Frankfurt, Germany, where his father entertained leading Zionists and intellectuals, and where he attended the Musterschule. In 1911, while still in high school, he and his father attended the Tenth Zionist Congress. Goldmann went on to study law, history and philosophy in Marburg, Heidelberg and Berlin. He graduated in law and philosophy.

In 1913 he visited Palestine for four months, publishing his impressions the following year in his book Eretz Israel, Reisebriefe aus Palästina (Eretz Israel, Travel letters from Palestine), which was published in two editions. In 1916–18, Goldmann worked for the German "Nachrichtenstelle für den Orient", an intelligence and propaganda bureau linked to the German Foreign Office, which tried to exploit ethnic and religious nationalist currents within the Ottoman Empire such as Panturkism, Islamism and Zionism in German interests, to fight back increasing British and French influence in the region. In that period, the head of "Nachrichtenstelle" was Prof. Dr. Eugen Mittwoch, a leading German Arabist and Orientalist and at the same time a leading personality in Germany's Jewish community. During this period, he attempted to enlist Kaiser Wilhelm's support for the Zionist ideal. In 1922 he founded the Eschkol-Publikations-Gesellschaft (Eschkol Publication Society), and was involved in publishing a Zionist periodical. In 1929 he and Jakob Klatzkin started the project Encyclopaedia Judaica, which reflected the work of the leading Jewish scholars of the day. Eschkol published ten volumes of the Encyclopaedia Judaica in German and two volumes in Hebrew. Goldmann was falsely denounced by the Nazis as a secret communist agent shortly after the Beer Hall Putsch.

In 1934 he married Alice Gottschalk and they had two sons, Guido, born 1938 in Switzerland, who founded the German Marshall Fund in the United States in 1972, and Michael.

In November 1934, Goldmann petitioned Mussolini's support in relation to the Jews of the Saar, a region about to reunite with what was then Nazi Germany. In 1933, he managed to escape arrest by the Gestapo because he was in Palestine for his father's funeral.

In 1935 he was stripped of his German citizenship, and became a citizen of Honduras thanks to the intervention of the French Minister Louis Barthou. Later he moved to the United States, settling in New York City, where he represented the Jewish Agency for several years.

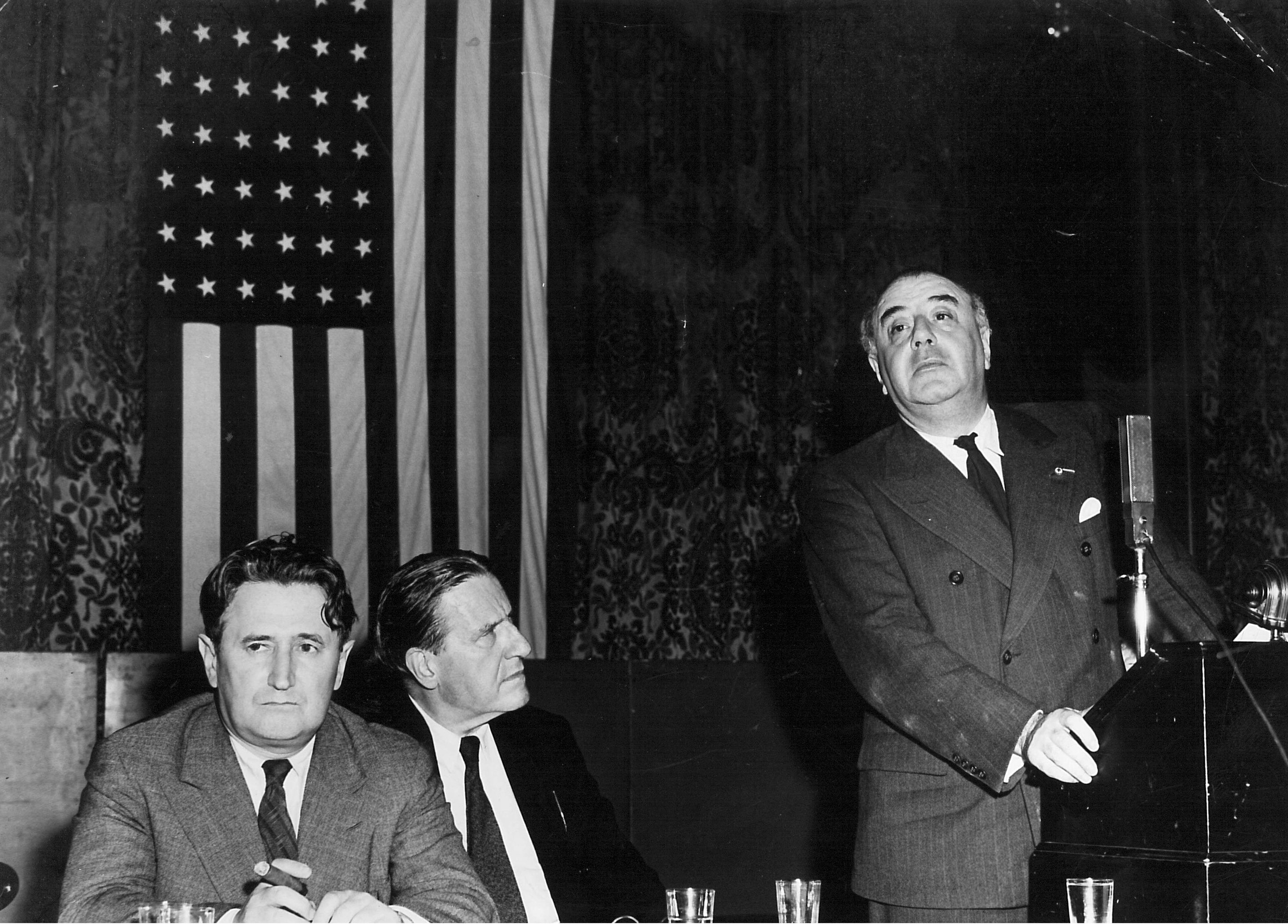
Nahum Goldmann, Rabbi Stephen S. Wise and Henry Torres (speaking) at a World Jewish Congress conference in New York, June 1942

In 1936, Goldmann and Reform Rabbi Stephen S. Wise established the World Jewish Congress (WJC). He is credited with early prediction of the threat posed by Hitler and the Nazi Party. In the spring of 1942 he said, "[W]ho can foretell what the Nazi regime, once brought into the position of the surrounded killer, will do in the last moment before it goes down to shame?" Addressing the Zionist Organization of America in October 1942, having heard the reports of genocide, he lamented, "Our generation is in the tragic position that one-half of the generation is being slaughtered before our eyes, and the other half has to sit down and cannot prevent this catastrophe." Goldmann took up residence in the United States in June 1940, eventually became a U.S. citizen, and remained there until 1964.

Goldmann died in Bad Reichenhall, Germany of pulmonary collapse. He was buried in Jerusalem's Mount Herzl National Cemetery in the section reserved for leaders of the World Zionist Organization. His funeral was not attended by then-Prime Minister Menachem Begin, and no official statement of grief was issued by the Israeli government. Yasser Arafat sent condolences, stating that "The Palestinians mourn the death of Nahum Goldmann. He was a Jewish statesman of a unique personality. He fought for justice and legitimate rights for all peoples."

== Jewish and Zionist activism ==
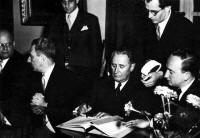
Nahum Goldmann signing the Reparations Treaty with West Germany, 1952

Goldmann found Jewish leadership in the U.S. divided, with no cohesive policy in place at a time when unity of "intention and purpose was vital." Deeply frustrated over this divided leadership, he declared, 'In all my years in Jewish politics, I have never felt so impotent, so grimly bitter as I did over this. All of us who speak for the Jewish people in those days—and I emphatically include myself—bear a share of the guilt.' Both he and Stephen Wise, working closely together, had been exponents of the 'democratization of Jewish life'; that is, "an informed and assertive public." But under the stress of wartime conditions, and on the eve of the 1940 American presidential elections, they came to doubt the efficacy of public pressure, preferring quiet diplomacy behind the scenes as the more effective means of pursuing viable goals. Among other reasons it was this view, shared by Goldmann and Wise, which led them strongly to oppose Hillel Kook's (Peter Bergson)'s energetic, creative and public methods of attempting to rescue the abandoned Jews of Europe. As a result, Goldman and Wise became leading obstructors of rescue.

Consistent in his view that "in exerting political pressure at home, one must always be cautious and tactful or risk incurring the hostility of influential diplomatic figures," neither Goldmann nor the Jewish leadership around him mounted a public campaign against the American immigration quota system even as European Jewry were seeking refuge from Nazism. Some American Jews, including Louis Brandeis and Felix Frankfurter, did try their hands at quiet diplomacy with some success, such that the quotas were being filled by 1939. The worsening of the refugee problem after the Anschluss in 1938, however, created additional pressure, leading President Roosevelt to call for an international conference known as the Evian Conference, which met in France in July of that year. The conference goal was to find homes for the hundreds of thousands of displaced Jews. Goldmann attended as an observer for the World Jewish Congress. Of the 32 nations that attended, only the Dominican Republic agreed to accept additional refugees.

In such circumstances, efforts were mainly directed towards the old program of 'rehabilitating Palestine'. Goldmann called for an extraordinary Zionist conference in 1942 to form a cohesive strategy to attenuate the devastating effects of Nazi policies on European Jews, and the outcome was the Biltmore program, which called for, among other things, unrestricted Jewish immigration to Palestine. In his address to the conference Goldmann warned that Nazi rhetoric was to be taken seriously, and that there were foreseeable genocidal consequences for European Jews were the Nazis to press on with their policies. At the May 1943 American Emergency Committee meeting Goldmann, along with Abba Hillel Silver, was an advocate of the rationale that the struggle against the MacDonald White Paper was a step in the establishment of the Jewish commonwealth.

In January 1945, Goldmann was instrumental in the creation of a committee combining the efforts of the American Jewish Joint Distribution Committee (JDC) and the Jewish Agency for the rescue and rehabilitation of the remnants of the Jewish people in Europe. Goldmann had long supported the creation of two states in Palestine, one Arab and one Jewish; his view was that independence was more important than controlling specific territory, and his definition was that the aim should be to create 'a viable Jewish state in an adequate area of Palestine’. After the war he worked actively with David Ben-Gurion towards the creation of Israel, although he, with Moshe Shertok, advised Ben-Gurion, in vain, that the declaration of independence be delayed in order to allow more time for reaching a diplomatic entente with the Arabs. He was concerned that an Arab-Israeli war would break out after the British left their Mandate and the State of Israel was proclaimed.

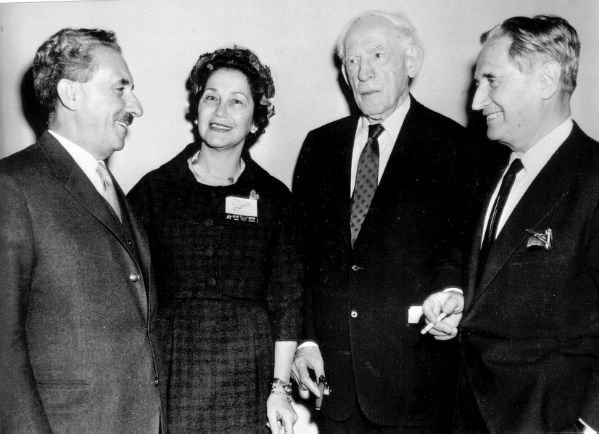
Moshe Sharett, Miriam Freund, Louis Lipsky and Nahum Goldmann, 1960

From 1951 he was the chairman of the executive committee of the Jewish Agency. In that year, he convened a meeting in New York City of 23 major national and international Jewish organizations to address the task of negotiating an agreement with the West German government for the reparations to Jews for losses caused by Nazi Germany and the Holocaust. The Conference on Jewish Material Claims against Germany (also known as the Claims Conference) was the organization that emerged from this meeting. On September 10, 1952, after six months of negotiations, a reparations agreement between the Claims Conference and Konrad Adenauer's government of West Germany was reached. Noting the historic import of the agreement, David Ben-Gurion said in 1952 [to?] Dr. Goldmann, “For the first time in the history of the Jewish people, oppressed and plundered for hundreds of years...the oppressor and plunderer has had to hand back some of the spoil and pay collective compensation for part of the material losses.” In 1954, a similar treaty was signed between Austria and Israel.

Goldmann served as president of the World Jewish Congress, the coordinating body for many Jewish organizations outside Israel. He supported Israel in other countries, even though he was a profound critic of official Israeli policies. From 1956 to 1968, Goldmann served as the President of the World Zionist Organization. In that capacity Goldmann was openly critical of the Israeli Government's actions in the abduction of Adolf Eichmann, and urged referring the matter to an international court. He became a citizen of Israel in 1962, and of Switzerland in 1969. He never took up permanent residence in Israel, dividing his time between Israel and Switzerland. During his life he held seven citizenships, and lived the last part of it in Paris.

== Memorial Foundation for Jewish Culture ==
The Memorial Foundation for Jewish Culture was founded in 1964 by Goldmann who negotiated reparations with Federal Republic of Germany Chancellor Dr Konrad Adenauer. Goldmann's vision for the MFJC was to foster a new generation of artists, academics, and Torah scholars to replace those who were decimated in the Holocaust. In total, Goldmann received over 20 million dollars from the government of West Germany government to promote Jewish cultural life globally.

Since its creation, the MFJC has provided over 16,000 provide grants to Jewish academic, research, and educational bodies as well as individual scholarships and fellowships. The Foundation provides grants to leaders across every gamut of Jewish life.

=== Nahum Goldmann Fellowship Program ===
The Nahum Goldmann Fellowship program was created in 1987 to assemble young Jewish leaders from all over the world, discuss issues relevant to them, explore their Jewish identity, hone their leadership skills, and learn about Jewish communities in other parts of the world.

Fellowship programs have been held all over the world and over 1,000 people from over 70 countries are alumni of the program. In 2016, a program was held in Havana, Cuba. This was the first Jewish seminar in Cuba in almost 60 years.

== Views and opinions ==
Though a strong supporter of Zionism, Goldmann was also a strong supporter of the idea of a Diaspora as Goldmann felt that a Jewish state would not answer all the needs of the Jewish people. He was concerned about Jewish assimilation, and fought to strengthen Jewish education, culture and institutions outside of Israel.

Goldmann was critical of Israel for what he saw as its over-reliance on military might, and for not making more concessions after the 1967 Six-Day War, advocating a position that the only chance of long-term survival for Israel was to accept the rights of the Palestinians as a people.

He repeatedly advocated peaceful co-existence between Arabs and Israelis, saying: "There can be no future for the Jewish state unless agreement is reached with the Arabs."

In October 1967, he met Yugoslav leader Josip Broz Tito, and asked him to inform other Communist leaders, as well as Arab leaders, about his ideas for a peaceful settlement. In early 1970, he was invited to talks by Egyptian president Gamel Abdel Nasser but was stopped by the Israeli government. Attempts to contact PLO leader Yasser Arafat, in 1974, were even seen as high treason, an extreme view Goldmann thought foolish. In 1982, he called on the Israeli Prime Minister not to reanimate anti-Zionism and antisemitism with the invasion of Lebanon.

In 1977, Goldmann expressed his frustration with Israel's approach to the peace process:

In 30 years, Israel has never presented the Arabs with a single peace plan. She has rejected every settlement plan devised by her friends and by her enemies. She has seemingly no other object than to preserve the status quo while adding territory piece by piece.

In 1981, he criticized the tactic of using the Holocaust to justify atrocities and murders:

We will have to understand that Jewish suffering during the Holocaust no longer will serve as a protection, and we certainly must refrain from using the argument of the Holocaust to justify whatever we may do. The use of the Holocaust as excuse for bombing of Lebanon, for instance, as Menachem Begin does, is a kind of „Hillul Hashem“ [sacrilege], a banalization of the sacred tragedy of the Soah [Holocaust], which must not be misused to politically doubtful and morally indefensible policies.

Consulted by a senior figure of the PLO during the siege of Beirut, he set forth five political principles that would prove conducive to securing the PLO's political battle on a firmer footing: (1) abandon Beirut, (2) end terrorism, (3) relocate in Tunis, the only area where the Palestinian leadership could enjoy real political liberty, (4) set up a provisional government which would immediately be recognized by at least 150 countries, and (5) recognize Israel. If these measures were taken, Goldmann advised, the PLO would establish the basis for the creation of a Palestinian state alongside that of Israel. Goldmann's vision was to make Israel the spiritual and moral center for all Jews, a neutral state somewhat on the model of Switzerland, with international guarantees of its security, existence and borders, and perhaps even a permanent symbolic international presence.

== Published works ==
- Erez-Israel—Reisebriefe aus Palästina 1914: online at archive.org
- Der Geist des Militarismus (The Spirit of Militarism) Stuttgart 1915 online at HathiTrust
- Von der weltkulturellen Bedeutung und Aufgabe des Judentums (Of the world-cultural meaning and task of the Jews) München 1916
- Staatsmann ohne Staat (Statesman Without a State, autobiography), 1970, Köln: Kiepenheuer-Witsch. ISBN 3-462-00780-7
- The Autobiography of Nahum Goldmann: Sixty Years of Jewish Life. Holt, Rinehart and Winston. 1969. ISBN 0-03-081337-9.
- The Jewish Paradox. Grosset & Dunlap. 1978. ISBN 0-448-15166-9. in French: online at archive.org
- Mein Leben als deutscher Jude (My Life as a German Jew), 1982, München: Langen-Müller. ISBN 3-7844-1771-X.
- Nahum Goldmann (1970). "The Future of Israel". Foreign Affairs. 49: 51–69.
- (Fall 1978). Zionist Ideology and the Reality of Israel, Foreign Affairs.
- 3 works in Yiddish language: online at archive.org

== Legacy and commemoration ==
- In 1956, received the Solomon Bublick Award of the Hebrew University of Jerusalem.
- In 1968, was honored with the Order of Rio Branco.
- Beth Hatefutsoth, the Museum of the Jewish Diaspora, at Tel Aviv University
- The Nahum Goldmann Fellowship Program

== See also ==
- Claims Conference
- Conference of Presidents of Major American Jewish Organizations
- Jewish Agency for Israel
- Wiedergutmachung
- World Jewish Congress
- World Zionist Organization
