= Walter Schmiele =

German writer and translator (1909–1998)

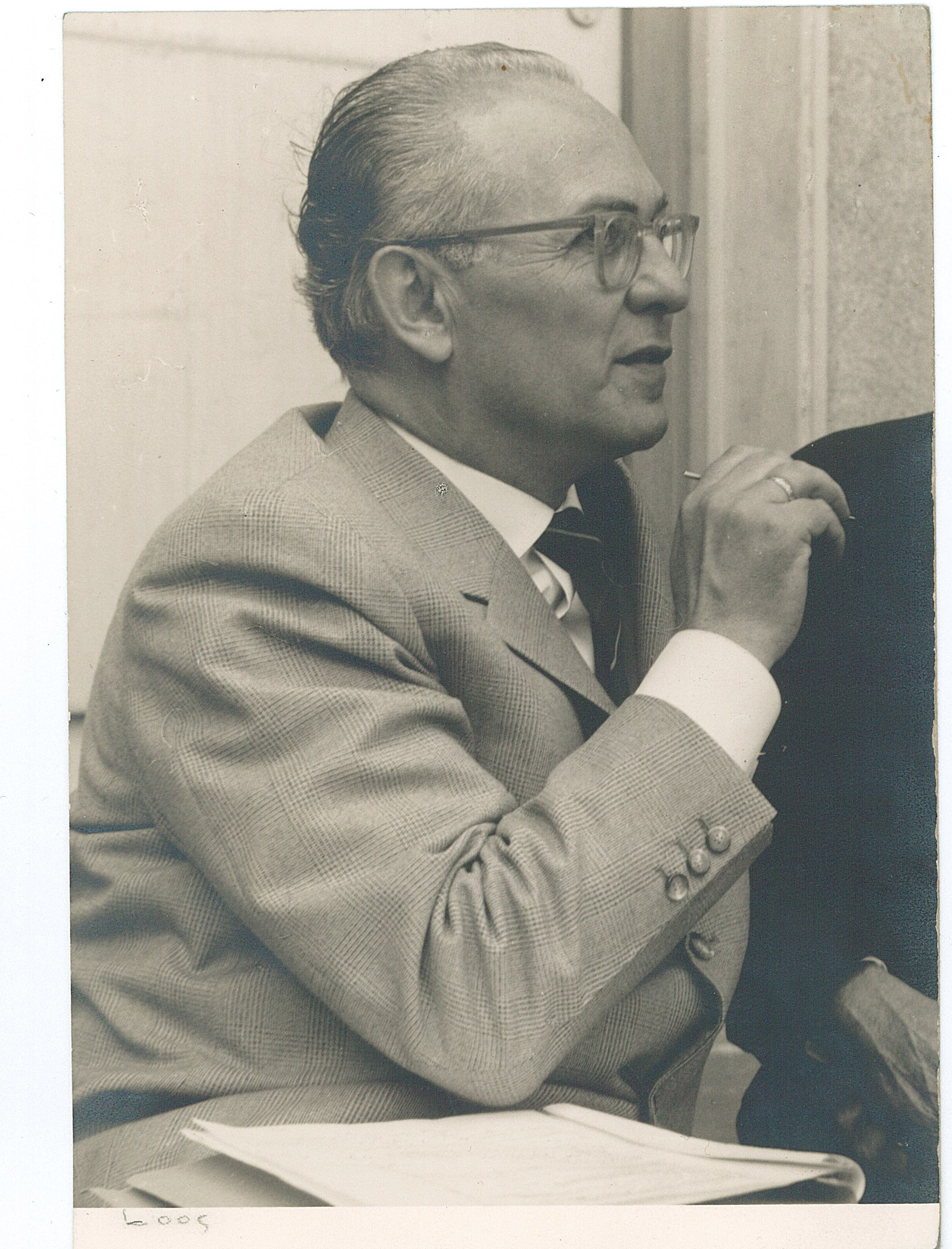
Walter Schmiele (1909–1998), German writer and translator

Walter Schmiele (12 April 1909 in Swinemünde – 21 October 1998 in Darmstadt) was a German writer and translator.

== Life ==
Schmiele grew up in Frankfurt am Main. He studied German literature, philosophy and history at the universities of Frankfurt, Heidelberg, Vienna and Rostock. He earned his Ph.D. in Frankfurt, with his dissertation on Theodor Storm. Among his teachers were Friedrich Gundolf, Karl Jaspers, Paul Tillich, Karl Mannheim, and Ernst Kantorowicz. Still a student, he began his freelance career for many newspapers. Between 1934 and 1941, he contributed more than 80 feature essays to the "Frankfurter Zeitung". He began living in Darmstadt in 1940.

After the Second World War, he worked as a freelance journalist and literary critic for many newspapers and radio stations. He wrote poetry and short stories (published in the Reclam-Anthology "Deutsche Erzähler der Gegenwart", ("German Contemporary Storytellers") edited by Willi Fehse, 1960)and in the Penguin "Twentieth-Century German Verse". Schmiele published essays and translated poetry and prose from the English language. His translation of Confessions of an English Opium-Eater ("Bekenntnisse eines englischen Opiumessers") von Thomas De Quincey, first published in 1947 (Parzeller) was re-issued by Goverts (1962), DTV (1965), Medusa (1982) and Insel (2009).

In the 1950s Walter Schmiele initiated the radio program "Vom Geist der Zeit" (Spirit of Times) for the Hessischen Rundfunk and contributed many scripts to the program. In 1951-1953, he was editor of the "Neue literarische Welt". From 1956 to 1962, he was Secretary-General of the German P.E.N.-Centre, a position in which he organized the 1959 International P.E.N. Congress held in Frankfurt. His 1961 published Monography on Henry Miller (rororo) was regularly re-issued since then and was translated in various languages (among others in French, Japanese and Dutch). In 1990, Schmiele edited a collection of texts by Kasimir Edschmid in the "Darmstädter Schriften" series ("Kasimir Edschmid, Essay – Rede – Feuilleton").

== Personal works ==
- 1946: Unvergessliches Gesicht. Fünf Prosastücke
- 1949: Englische Dichtung deutsch.
- 1953: Englische Geisteswelt
- 1954: Dichter über Dichtung
- 1961: Stefan George
- 1961: Henry Miller
- 1963: Die Milch der Wölfin
- 1963: Nietzsche: der gute Europäer
- 1963: Über Ernst Jünger
- 1963: Über Karl Jaspers
- 1963: Dandy und Provokateur
- 1963: Zwei Essays zur literarischen Lage
- 1964: Versuch einer Sinnbestimmung des modernen Irrationalismus
- 1966: Zur Geschichte der Utopie
- 1984: Poesie der Welt, Nordamerika
- 1985: Poesie der Welt, England
- 1990: Kasimir Edschmid, Essay - Rede – Feuilleton
- 2010: Mit wenigen Strichen. Porträts und Glossen

== Translations ==
- 1948: John Keats, "Hyperion"
- 1949: "Englische Dichtung deutsch", von Blake bis Yeats;
- 1947: De Quincey: "Bekenntnisse eines englischen Opiumessers"
- 1960: Ferlinghetti, "Sie"

== Awards ==
- Lyrikpreis des Südverlags 1949
- Johann-Heinrich-Merck-Ehrung der Stadt Darmstadt 1970

== See also ==
- Ernst Jünger
- Karl Jaspers
- Stefan George
