= Intelligence Bureau for the East =

German intelligence organisation, founded before World War I

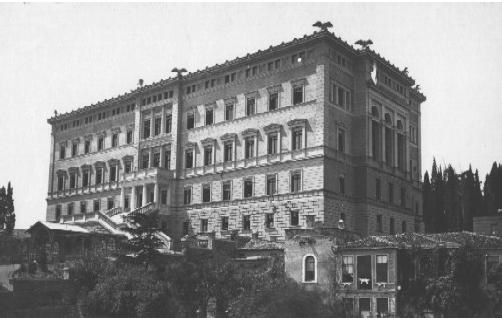
The German mission in Istanbul

The Intelligence Bureau for the East (German: Nachrichtenstelle für den Orient) was a German intelligence organisation established on the eve of World War I dedicated to promoting and sustaining subversive and nationalist agitations in the British Raj and the Persian and Egyptian satellite states. Attached to the German Foreign Office, it was headed by archaeologist Baron Max von Oppenheim and, during the war, worked intricately with the deposed Khedive Abbas II of Egypt, and Indian revolutionary organisations including the Berlin Committee, Jugantar, the Ghadar Party, as well as with prominent Muslim socialists including Maulavi Barkatullah. Aside from Oppenheim himself, recruits to the bureau included Franz von Papen, later briefly the Chancellor of the Weimar Republic, Wilhelm Wassmuss (sometimes referred to as the German Lawrence), Gunther von Wesendonck, Ernst Sekunna, and others. Oppenheim was replaced in 1915 by Schabinger von Schowingen, and later in 1916 by Eugen Mittwoch, internationally the most respected and prestigious German orientalist (and also a respected Orthodox Jewish scholar), who recruited more liberal and cosmopolitan people for the Nachrichtenstelle such as Friedrich Schrader, his Swiss associate Max Rudolf Kaufmann or the young Nahum Goldmann (later President of the World Jewish Congress).

In its initial period, the bureau was intricately involved in almost all the events that ultimately came to be called the Hindu–German Conspiracy, including the Annie Larsen affair, Ghadar Mutiny, Siam–Burma plan, attempts in Bengal, as well as other lesser known plots in the Near East including of the western borders of British India and in Afghanistan.

In addition to its subversive campaigns against British possessions in India, it also attempted to instigate instability in British possessions in the Muslims in India as well as around the world in the Middle East and in Egypt. It was involved in early Turkish plans for war and the Caliph's decision to declare Jihad. The bureau was involved in intelligence and subversive missions to Persia and to Afghanistan, and also attempted, along with the Berlin Committee, to recruit Indian soldiers in Mesopotamia. Its Persia operations were led by Wilhelm Wassmuss, the 1915 Afghanistan Mission by Werner Otto von Hentig

== See also ==
- Halbmondlager
- Mosque of the Bois de Vincennes
