= Halbmondlager =

First World War German prison camp

Coordinates: 52.1669°N 13.4858°E

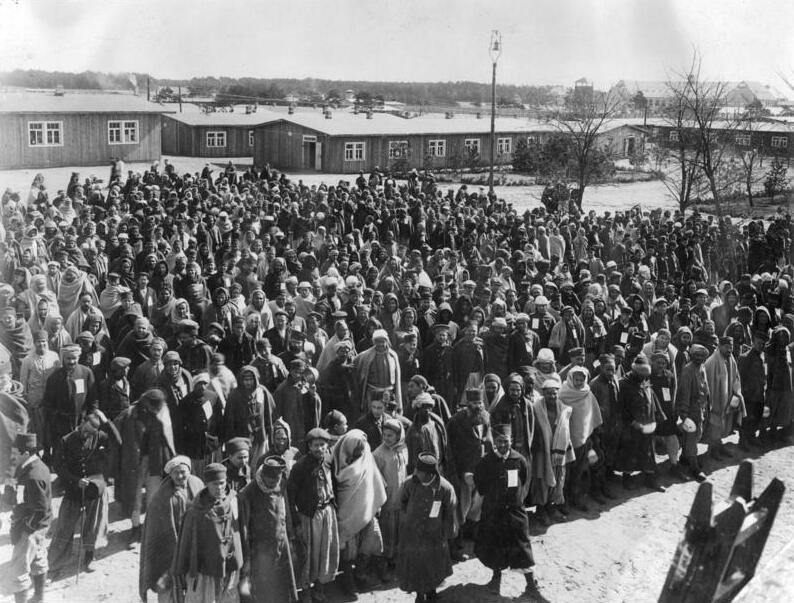
POWs in the Halbmondlager (April 1915)

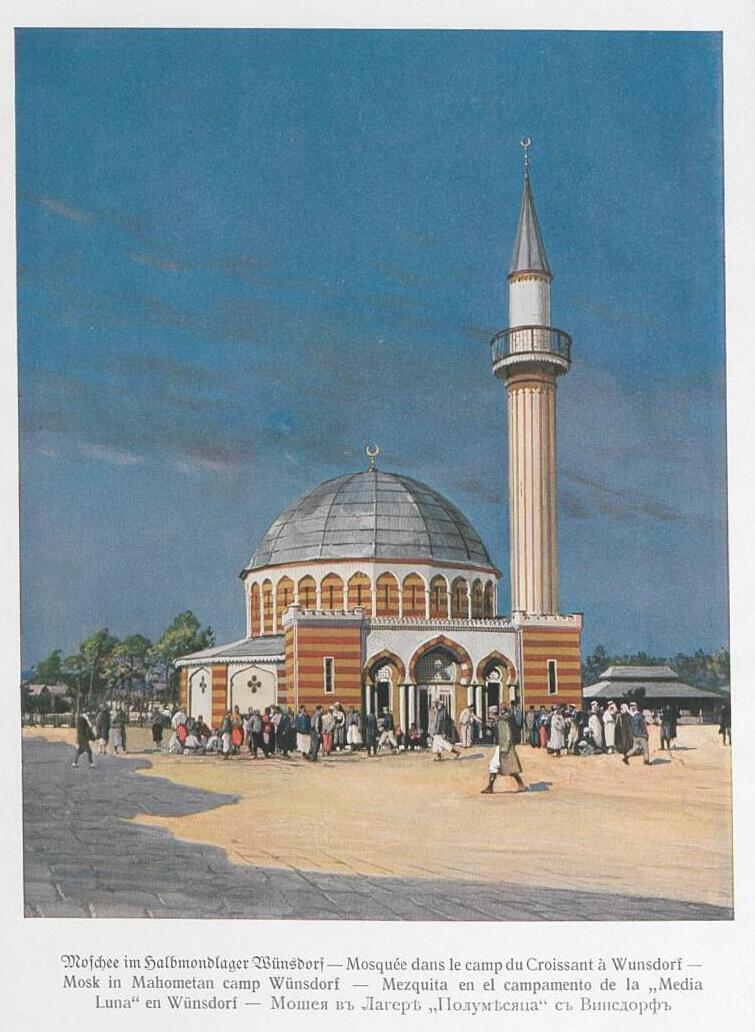
Wünsdorf Mosque

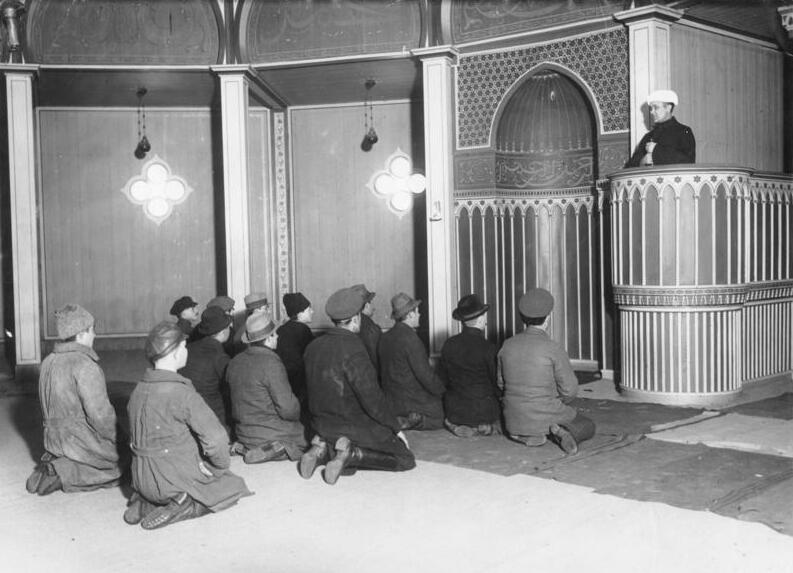
Interned Soviet soldiers of Muslim faith, who had fled the Polish-Soviet War into East Prussia, Germany, attending the mosque in Wünsdorf, in the early 1920s

The Halbmondlager was a prisoner-of-war camp in Wünsdorf (now part of Zossen), Germany, during the First World War. The name translates as Crescent Camp or Half-Moon Camp (sometimes also used as a name in English publications) and refers to the crescent, a symbol of Islam.

The camp housed approximately 30,000 Arab, Indian, and African prisoners of war from the British and French allied armies. The primary purpose of the camp was to persuade detainees to wage jihad against the United Kingdom and France, in line with the 1914 Ottoman jihad proclamation, serving as a showcase for Germany's war propaganda. To that end, "detainees lived in relative luxury and were given everything they needed to practise their faith". The camp was the site of the first mosque to be built in Germany, a large and ornate wooden structure completed in July 1915. The mosque, requested by the Grand Mufti of Constantinople (Ottoman Empire), was financed by the Prussian Army and modeled after the Dome of the Rock. It was demolished in 1925–1926 due to disrepair.

About 80 Sikh prisoners and Hindus from British India were also held in the camp, as well as around 50 Irishmen, and two Australian Aboriginal soldiers (Roland Carter and Douglas Grant). A subcamp, known as Inderlager (Camp of Indians), was established to house prisoners from India who were not openly pro-British; those who were pro-British had been sent to other camps instead.

The leader of the "jihad experiment" was Max von Oppenheim, a German diplomat and aristocrat. He established an office nearby to lead a propaganda campaign with the "show camp", "self-consciously styled as a theatre for the wider world", at its centre. Oppenheim was assisted by Shaykh Sâlih al-Sharîf, a Tunisian who had served in the Ottoman Empire's intelligence agency. He served as a spiritual leader for the detainees. Furthermore, Oppenheim cooperated with the Berlin Committee (later: Indian Independence Committee) in order to publish a propagandist Urdu- and Hindi-language newspaper, which was distributed in the camp.

Anthropologists, musicologists like Robert Lachmann and linguists used the 'favourable conditions' within the camp to conduct research. The Royal Prussian Phonographic Commission, under the auspices of the linguist Wilhelm Doegen, set out to record voice and language samples in the shape of stories, poems and songs of over 250 languages. The remaining recordings are held at the phonographic archive of the Humboldt Universität of Berlin. In 2014/15, an exhibition called Phonographed Sounds - Photographed Moments presented sound and image documents from WWI German prison camps.

Up to 3,000 of the detainees from the camp were recruited into the German Army to fight in North Africa and the Middle East. However, low morale and troop revolt plagued the resulting divisions, and few believed in the jihadist cause. In 1917 the remaining prisoners were forced to agricultural labour in Romania.

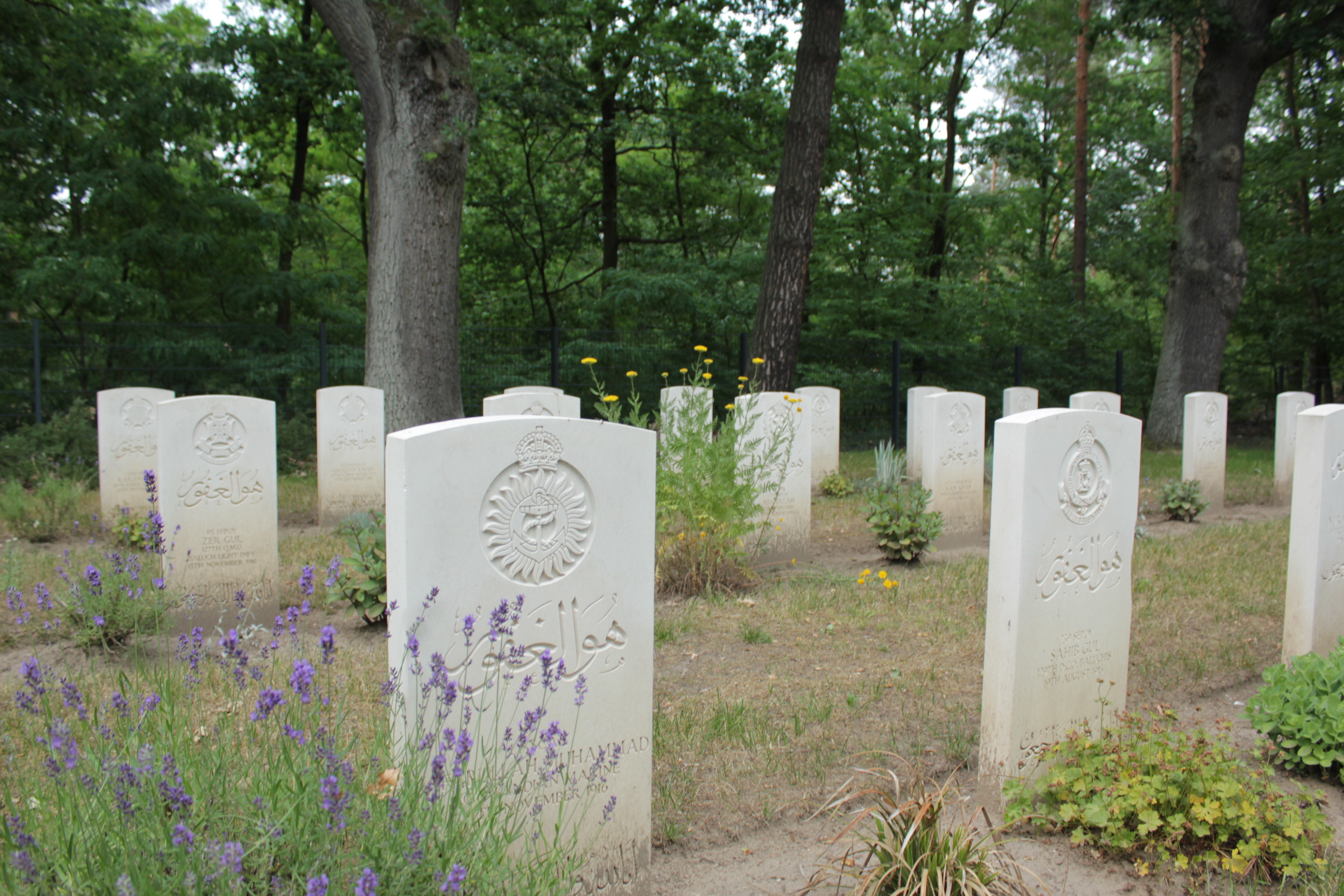
Cemetery

The story of the camp was largely omitted from English-language texts, until nearly a century after the war. It was discussed extensively in German history works.

== See also ==
- Mosque of the Bois de Vincennes
