= Hans Humann =

German diplomat (1878–1933)

Hans Humann (1878 in İzmir – 7 October 1933) was an officer in the Imperial German Navy, diplomat (Naval Attaché) and businessman. Humann became famous as one of the main representatives of the German Reich in the Ottoman Empire during the First World War, as well as the publisher of the widely circulated Deutsche Allgemeine Zeitung since 1920, when industrialist Hugo Stinnes bought the paper. Humann was a key German eyewitness of the Armenian genocide. As a personal friend and key wartime associate of Enver Pasha, he even defended the genocide in newspaper articles for DAZ during the Weimar Republic.
