= Rudolf Marcuse =

German sculptor (1878–1940)

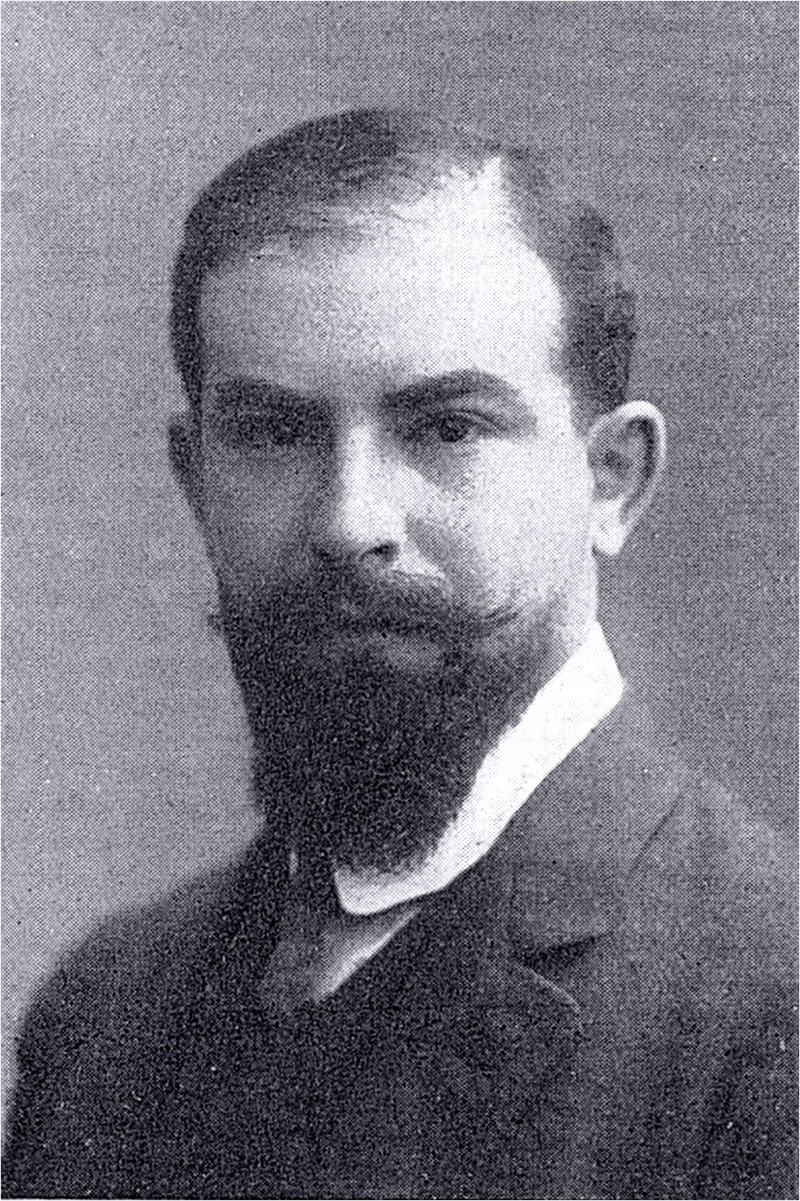
Rudolf Marcuse (c.1909)

Rudolf Marcuse (15 January 1878, Berlin – 3 April 1940, London) was a German sculptor of Jewish ancestry. Most of his works were relatively small, and many were designed for porcelain.

== Life and work ==
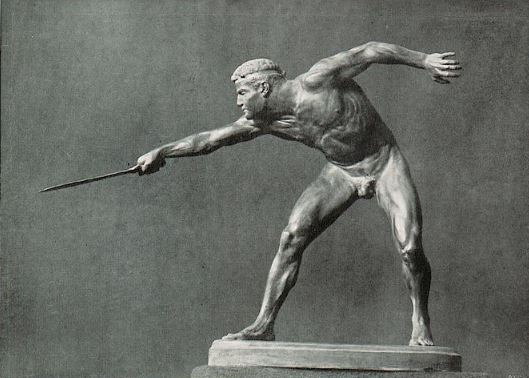
The Gladiator

He was the son of a merchant. His first professional lessons were at the Academy of Arts, Berlin, with the sculptor, Ernst Herter. In 1902, he was awarded a scholarship by the Board of Trustees. The following year, he was awarded the Michael Beer Prize for his "Judgement of Solomon". In 1909, he created one of his few large works, a memorial to the philosopher Moses Mendelssohn at the Jewish Boys' School. It was destroyed in 1941 by members of the Sturmabteilung (SA).

In 1910, he received the "Rome Prize" (modelled after the French Prix de Rome) from the Prussian Academy of Arts, which enabled him to stay in the Villa Strohl-Fern. That same year, he won a gold medal at the Brussels International. During this period, he designed numerous statuettes in the Art Nouveau and Art Deco styles, which were produced by the bronze caster, Hermann Gladenbeck. He also designed porcelain figures for the Schwarzburg Porcelain Workshops, the Royal Porcelain Factory, Berlin, and the Rosenthal Manufactory.

During World War I, he visited several prisoner-of-war camps, where he created thirty-seven sculptures, depicting the various ethnic types and nationalities among the prisoners. These were meant to be placed in a proposed "Reichskriegsmuseum" (National War Museum), which was never completed. In 1915, he apparently married a sculptor named Elisabeth Seligsohn, about whom very little is known.

As late as 1930, he was receiving monetary awards from the Prussian Cultural Ministry. This came to an abrupt end in 1933, when the National Socialist party came to power and began rejecting his applications due to his "Non-Aryan race". In 1936, thanks to his status as a "War Artist", he was allowed to emigrate to England. If Elisabeth was still alive, she did not go with him. In 1939, he may have married an Englishwoman named Alice. Neither marriage appears to be reliably documented. He died at his home in London, aged sixty-two.

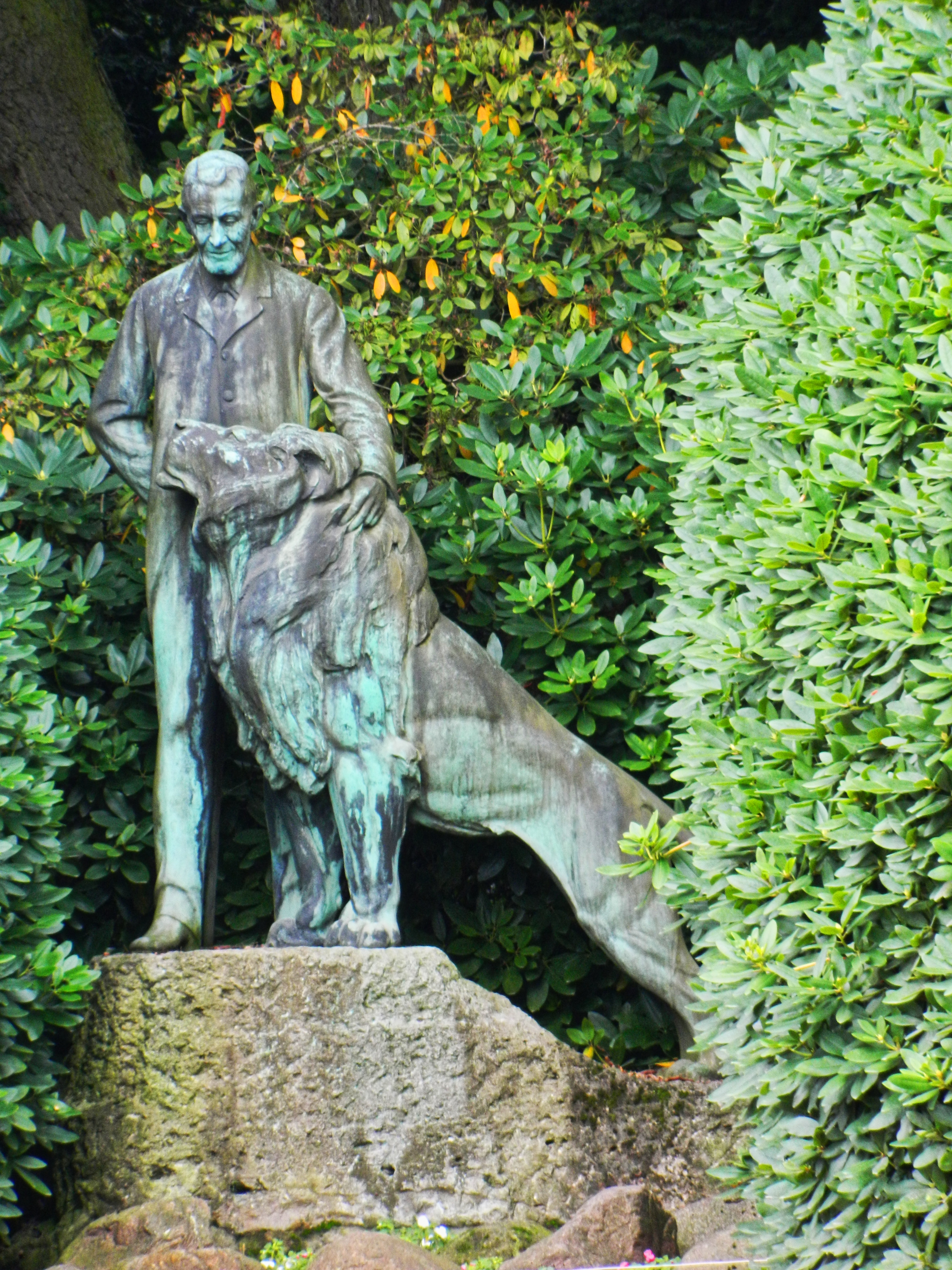
The wild animal importer and trainer, Carl Hagenbeck, with a lion named "Triest", who saved his life when he was attacked by a tiger.
