= Frankfurter Zeitung =

1856–1943 German-language newspaper

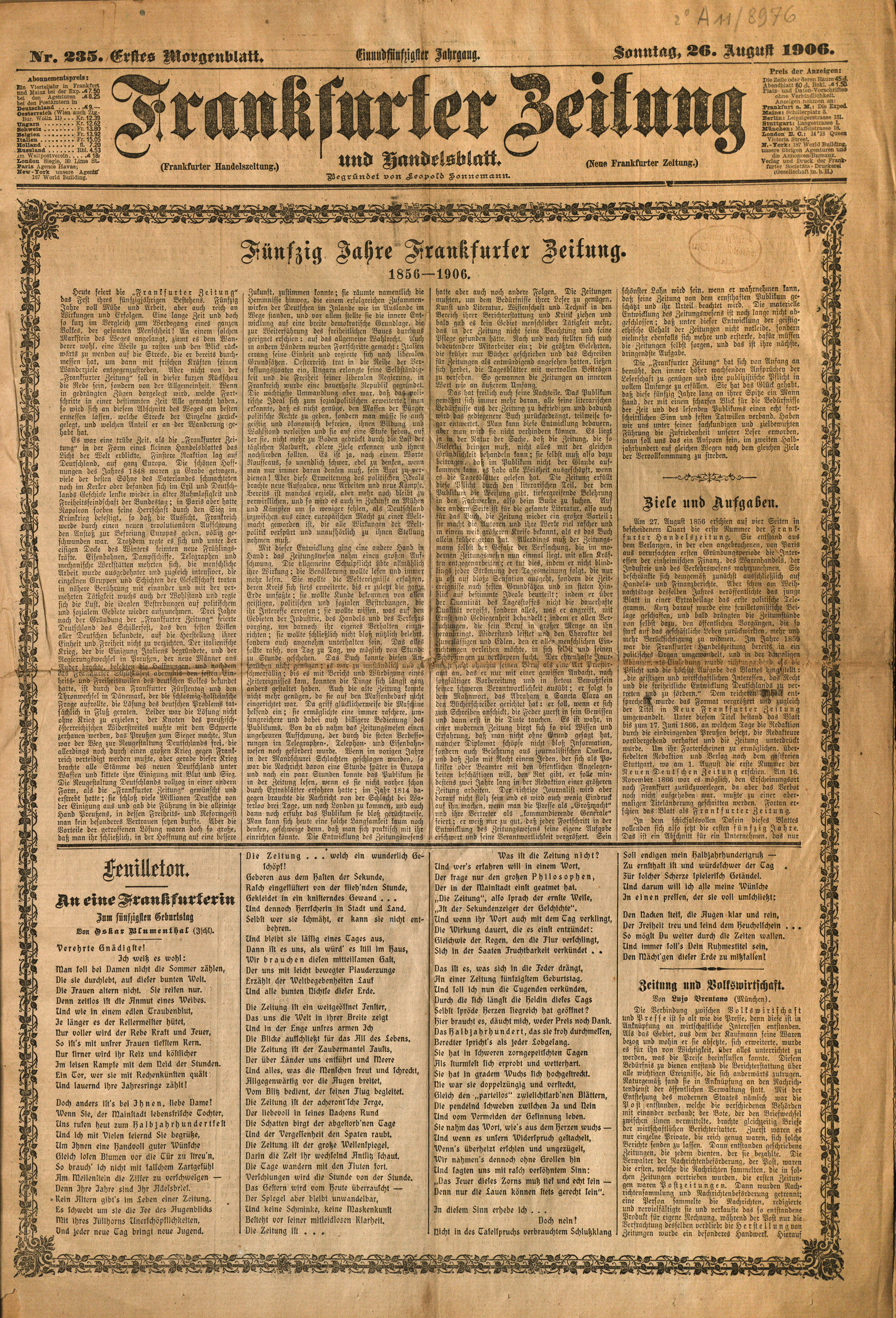
Frankfurter Zeitung, 1906

The Frankfurter Zeitung (lit. 'Frankfurt Newspaper', German: [ˈfʁaŋkfʊʁtɐ ˈtsaɪtʊŋ]) was a German-language newspaper that appeared from 1856 to 1943. It emerged from a market letter that was published in Frankfurt. In Nazi Germany, it was considered the only mass publication not completely controlled by the Propagandaministerium under Joseph Goebbels.

== History ==
In 1856, German writer and politician Leopold Sonnemann purchased a struggling market publication in Germany; the Frankfurter Geschäftsbericht (also known as Frankfurter Handelszeitung). Sonnemann changed its name to Neue Frankfurter Zeitung (later simply Frankfurter Zeitung) and assumed the duties of publisher, editor, and contributing writer. The new title incorporated political news and commentary, and by the time of the foundation of the German Empire in 1871, the Frankfurter Zeitung had become an important mouthpiece of the liberal bourgeois extra-parliamentary opposition. It advocated peace in Europe before 1914 and during World War I.

In Constantinople, Paul Weitz, a strong critic of German militarism and the German state's secret collaboration with the genocidal politics of the Young Turks, was the head of the Frankfurter Zeitung's news bureau. His close associates included Max Rudolf Kaufmann, a Swiss-born journalist, who was arrested and deported in 1916 for his criticism of German militarism and letters by him to Berlin which reported the deplorable state of the Ottoman army in the Caucasus, and Dr. Friedrich Schrader, a journalist with (in 1914) more than two decades of experience in Constantinople who commanded all major languages of Southeastern Europe and the Middle East, and contributed much about modern Turkish culture and literature.

During the period of the Weimar Republic, the paper was treated with hostility and derision by nationalist circles, due to its pronounced support of the Weimar Republic in 1919. At this time, it no longer stood in opposition to the government, and supported Gustav Stresemann's policy of reconciliation during his time as Foreign Minister from 1923 to 1929. The Frankfurter Zeitung was one of the few democratic papers of the time. It was known in particular for its Feuilleton section, edited by Benno Reifenberg, in which works of most of the great minds of the Weimar Republic were published.

=== Nazi era ===
After the 1933 assumption of power by the Nazis, several Jewish contributors had to leave the Frankfurter Zeitung, including Siegfried Kracauer and Walter Benjamin. The paper was finally sold in June 1934 to the chemical corporation IG Farben. The company's directors, particularly Carl Bosch, were well-disposed toward the paper because of its place in traditional German life, and believed it could be useful in promoting favorable publicity for the company.

During the Nazis' early time in power, the paper was initially protected by Hitler and Joseph Goebbels primarily for its convenient public relations appeal abroad, and retained more editorial independence than the rest of the press in the Third Reich. However, within a few years IG Farben gave up on the newspaper; inexorably, it had become compromised by the increasing oversight of the Nazi Ministry of Propaganda and was quickly losing its journalistic reputation abroad. The company's directors realized it no longer needed to influence domestic public opinion, "since there was effectively no public opinion left in Germany".

The paper was quietly sold and subsumed by a subsidiary of the Nazi publishing organ, Eher Verlag, in 1938. In late 1941, the paper was faced with scandal when Richard Sorge, the longtime Tokyo correspondent of the Frankfurter Zeitung and a Nazi party member, was arrested by the Japanese police under charges of espionage for the Soviet Union. Sorge was revealed to be the top Soviet spy in Japan, his allegiance to Nazism just a mere disguise for his real beliefs, and was executed in 1944. Faced with declining readership throughout the Second World War, the paper was closed down entirely in August 1943.

=== Postwar era ===
The Frankfurter Allgemeine Zeitung does not consider itself a successor organisation to the original Zeitung, even though many former journalists of the earlier paper helped launch it in 1949.

== Notable contributors ==
- Theodor W. Adorno
- Leopold Weiss
- Walter Benjamin
- Franz Blei
- Margret Boveri
- Alfred Döblin
- Kurt Eisner
- Lion Feuchtwanger
- Erich Kästner
- Max Rudolf Kaufmann, (correspondent in Constantinople before 1918)
- Editha Klipstein
- Annette Kolb
- Siegfried Kracauer
- Ernst Kreuder
- Heinrich Mann
- Thomas Mann
- Sándor Márai
- Franz Mehring
- Soma Morgenstern
- Peretz Naftali
- Kurt Offenburg
- Alfred Polgar
- Benno Reifenberg
- Joseph Roth
- Richard Sorge
- Friedrich Schrader, (correspondent in Constantinople before 1918)
- Anna Seghers
- Heinrich Schirmbeck
- Walter Schmiele
- Dolf Sternberger
- Max Weber
- Paul Weitz, (correspondent in Constantinople before 1918)
- Carl Zuckmayer
- Stefan Zweig

== Sources ==
- Gillessen, Günther (1987) [1986]. Auf verlorenem Posten. Die Frankfurter Zeitung im Dritten Reich (in German). Berlin: Siedler Verlag. ISBN 3-88680-223-X.
