= Hans von Wangenheim =

German diplomat

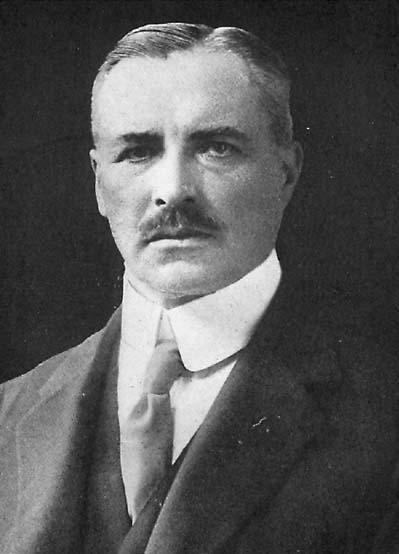
Baron Hans von Wangenheim

Hans, Baron von Wangenheim (1859 – 26 October 1915) was a diplomat for Imperial Germany.

In early 1915, he sent key reports to the German government about the Armenian genocide, then ongoing.

== Life ==
Hans von Wangenheim was a German noble born in Gotha, where he was educated at the Ernestine Gymnasium. In 1902 he married Johanna Freiin von Spitzemberg (1877–1960), the daughter of Carl, Baron von Spitzemberg and Hildegard Baroness von Spitzemberg, née Freiin von Varnbüler.

He served abroad as, First Secretary at the embassy in Constantinople (1899–1904), minister to Mexico (1904–1908), chargé d'affaires in Tangier (1908), minister in Athens (1909–1912) and ambassador to the Ottoman Empire (1912–1915).

With the outbreak of World War I, Wangenheim was instrumental in securing the entry of the Ottoman Empire into the war as part of the Central Powers. Wangenheim oversaw Max von Oppenheim's successful attempt to get Ottoman Caliph Mehmed V to declare Jihad against the Triple Entente. During the time of the Armenian genocide, there were accusations of German complicity and questions were raised as to Wangenheim's position of 'non-intervention'; the American ambassador to the Ottoman Empire, Henry Morgenthau, in his book Ambassador Morgenthau's Story (1918) would virulently criticise Wangenheim's role. In an interview with an American journalist, Wangenheim stated: "I do not blame the Turks for what they are doing to the Armenians ... They are entirely justified".

Also in Turkey at that time was the socialist revolutionary, arms dealer and German agent Alexander Parvus. Wangenheim sent Parvus to Berlin in March 1915 endorsing Parvus's plan that Germany back the Bolsheviks against the Russian Empire.

The Russian statesman Sergey Sazonov regarded Wangenheim as "the most successful of the German fighting diplomatists".

Wangenheim died of a stroke in Constantinople on 26 October 1915, then diagnosed to have been most likely as 'neurasthenic' tendencies. Rumors spread (even into the United States) that he had been poisoned.
