= Relations between Nazi Germany and the Arab world =

Aspect of the World War II period

Relations between Nazi Germany (1933–1945) and the Arab world ranged from indifference, fear, animosity, and confrontation to collaboration. The Arab intellectual elite (including liberals, Marxists and left-wing nationalists) was very critical of Nazism, perceiving it as totalitarian, racist, antisemitic and imperialist. However, Nazi hostility against the United Kingdom and France – which held colonies in the Arab World – offered an avenue of cooperation for some Arab and Muslim leaders. Nazi Germany used collaborators and propaganda throughout the Arab world in search of political allies. German Arabic propaganda was launched to stoke anti-Allied sentiment in the region. Nazi Germany established Barid Al Sharq, an Arab-language newspaper, as well as an Arabic station in Radio Berlin. Nazi propaganda alleged that Germany held a common anti-colonial interest, despite some of its allies also having colonies in the Arab world, namely Spain, Vichy France and Italy.

During the Anglo-Iraqi War, the Golden Square (a political clique of four generals led by Rashid Ali al-Gaylani) overthrew the pro-British Abd al-Ilah regency in Iraq and installed a pro-Axis government; this was swiftly overthrown by British forces.

Minor Nazi Party branches were established in the Middle East before the war by local German diaspora. In June 1941, Wehrmacht High Command Directive No. 32 and the "Instructions for Special Staff F" designated Special Staff F as the Wehrmacht's central agency for all issues that affected the Arab world. Nazi Germany along with Fascist Italy sent officials and military equipment to pro-Axis forces of the Golden Square during the Anglo-Iraqi War, part of the larger Middle East theatre of World War II.

Despite Amin al-Husseini's efforts to acquire German backing for Arab independence, Hitler refused to support them, remarking that he "wanted nothing from the Arabs". Nazi Germany was reluctant to initiate disputes with the Italian Empire or Vichy France colonies.

== Nazi Germany and the Arab World ==
=== Nazi perception of Arabs ===
In private, Adolf Hitler and Heinrich Himmler were recorded making complimentary statements about Islam as both a religion and a political ideology, describing it as a more disciplined, militaristic, political, and practical form of religion than Christianity is, and commending what they perceived were Muhammad's skills in politics and military leadership. Hitler was transcribed as saying: "Had Charles Martel not been victorious at Poitiers [...] then we should in all probability have been converted to Mohammedanism, that cult which glorifies the heroism and which opens up the seventh Heaven to the bold warrior alone. Then the Germanic races would have conquered the world." Conflicting this, however, are instances of likely false attributions: al-Husseini in his post-war memoirs may have mistaken Gottlob Berger's statement of sympathy for Islam concerning the Ottoman Empire as being Himmler's, as an earlier interview with an SS officer confirmed Berger as having made the statement. Hitler's case is more controversial; historian Mikael Nilsson has noted that Hitler's Table Talk, from which many of these quotations originate, consisted of heavily edited notes often taken the next day by Martin Bormann and his staff and further revised after the war. Bormann would routinely alter the transcripts to reflect his own anti-Christian agenda, while those entrusted with recording—Henry Picker and Heinrich Heim—acknowledged that Bormann frequently inserted statements not actually heard. Ritter, one of the 1951 edition's publishers, even deleted Hitler's use of the word "Crusade" to describe Operation Barbarossa. François Genoud, who later possessed most of the Table Talk manuscripts (the original German versions of which were "lost"), distorted them further and was also responsible for fabricating "Hitlers politisches Testament"—not to be confused with the Political Testament within the last will and testament of Adolf Hitler—in which he inserted pro-Arab and anti-colonial sentiments for his own political purposes. Hitler purportedly made warm references toward Islam, such as: "The peoples of Islam will always be closer to us than, for example, France." This line originated from "Hitlers politisches Testament", which has been conclusively proven to be a forgery. Genoud, a Swiss Nazi sympathizer connected with al-Husseini, falsely claimed to have obtained the document from Walther Funk, though multiple eyewitnesses denied Funk's involvement and confirmed the impossibility of the events Genoud described. Linguistic inconsistencies—including traces of retranslation from French to German—and anachronistic details further expose the text as inauthentic. Nilsson and other scholars have demonstrated that Genoud not only forged this document but also manipulated the German text of Table Talk when producing his French translations, inserting new anti-Christian and pro-Arab passages that were absent from any verified sources.

An exchange occurred when Hitler received Saudi Arabian ruler Ibn Saud's special envoy, Khalid al-Hud. Earlier in this meeting, Hitler claimed that one of the three reasons why Nazi Germany had some interest in the Arabs was:

[...] because we were jointly fighting the Jews. This led him to discuss Palestine and the conditions there, and he then stated that he himself would not rest until the last Jew had left Germany. Khalid Al Hud observed that the Prophet Mohammed [...] had acted the same way. He had driven the Jews out of Arabia [...]

Lebanese academic Gilbert Achcar wrote that Hitler "did not deem it useful" to point out to his Arab visitors at that meeting that, until then, he had incited German Jews to emigrate to Palestine (see Aliyah Bet and timeline of the Holocaust), and that the Third Reich assisted Zionist organizations avoid British-imposed restrictions on Jewish immigration as a means to rid the country of its Jewish population.

Hitler had told his military commanders in 1939, shortly before the beginning of World War II: "We shall continue to make disturbances in the Far East and in Arabia. Let us think as men and let us see in these peoples at best lacquered half-apes who are anxious to experience the lash." The official Nazi racial ideology considered Arabs racially inferior to Germans, a sentiment which was echoed in deprecating statements made by Hitler and other Nazi leaders. Referring to the Arab world, Hitler wrote in Mein Kampf (1925): "As a völkisch man, who appraises the value of men on a racial basis, I am prevented by mere knowledge of the racial inferiority of these so-called 'oppressed nations' from linking the destiny of my own people with theirs." In the preceding text, he had scornfully mocked the Muslim's idea of "Holy War".

When German troops were stationed in North Africa, one Arab complained:

"that the real opinions and feelings of the Germans seem to contradict the proclamations and broadcasts of German government offices." ... "Everywhere, we are termed 'colored' or even 'black'; almost every German soldier gives us clearly to understand that he counts us to be one of the most despised races of the world. Even expressions like 'Jew,' 'Nigger,' 'black scoundrels' etc. are not uncommon."

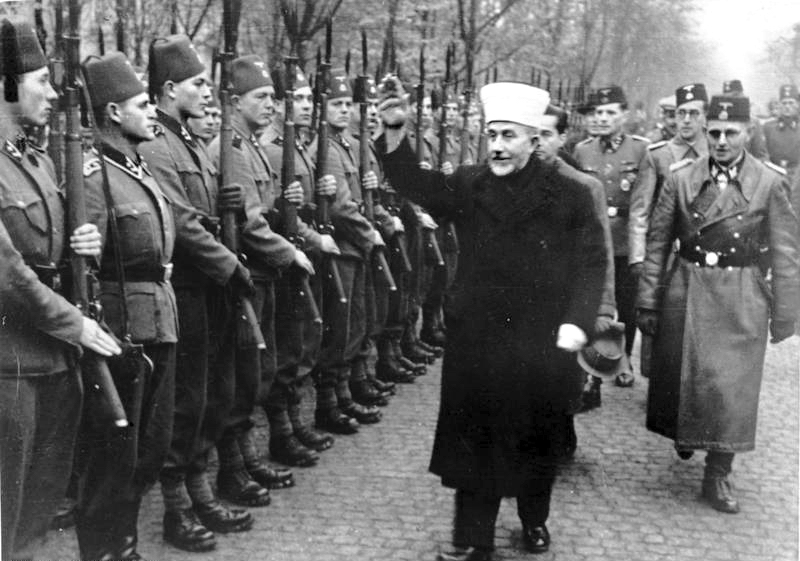
November 1943: al-Husseini greeting Bosnian Muslim Waffen-SS volunteers with a Nazi salute. At right is SS General Karl-Gustav Sauberzweig.

Despite the Nazi racial theory, which denigrated Arabs as racially inferior, individual Arabs who assisted the Third Reich by fighting against the Allies were treated with dignity and respect. The Grand Mufti of Jerusalem, Amin al-Husseini, for example, "was granted honorary Aryan" status by the Nazis for his close collaboration with Hitler and the Third Reich. After a meeting with al-Husseini, Hitler remarked:

With his blonde hair and blue eyes, he gives the impression, despite his shrew-like face, of a man whose ancestors were more likely to have been Aryans, and who perhaps is descended from the best Roman blood...In sheer intelligence he almost comes close to the Japanese."

Goebbels wrote in his diary regarding al-Husseini:

"The Führer has the same impression of the Grand Mufti of Jerusalem as I have. He considers him to be a descendant of the crusaders, and he also looks like one ... This Grand Mufti makes a very good impression on me. One might almost believe that it is about his completely Nordic appearance."

==== Nazi persecution of Arabs ====
While Arabs were a small population in Europe at the time, they were not free from Nazi persecution. Nazi harassment of Arabs began as early as 1932, where members of the Egyptian Student Association in Graz, Austria reported to the Egyptian consulate in Vienna that some Nazis had assaulted some of its members, throwing beer steins and armchairs at them, injuring them, and that "oddly enough" the police had not arrested the perpetrators, but the Egyptians. The Nazis attackers were later acquitted; one of the police officers, penciled the word "Jude" [Jew] after the names of three of the attacked Egyptians. In February 1934, the Egyptian Embassy in Berlin complained to the Reich Ministry of the Interior that a student had been attacked and insulted in a dance hall in Tübingen. The perpetrator had complained that he was not permitted to dance with a "German" because he was "black" and of a "lower race" and was punched. The attacker was not punished. On the onset of war, Egyptians living in Germany were interned in response to the internment of Germans in Egypt.

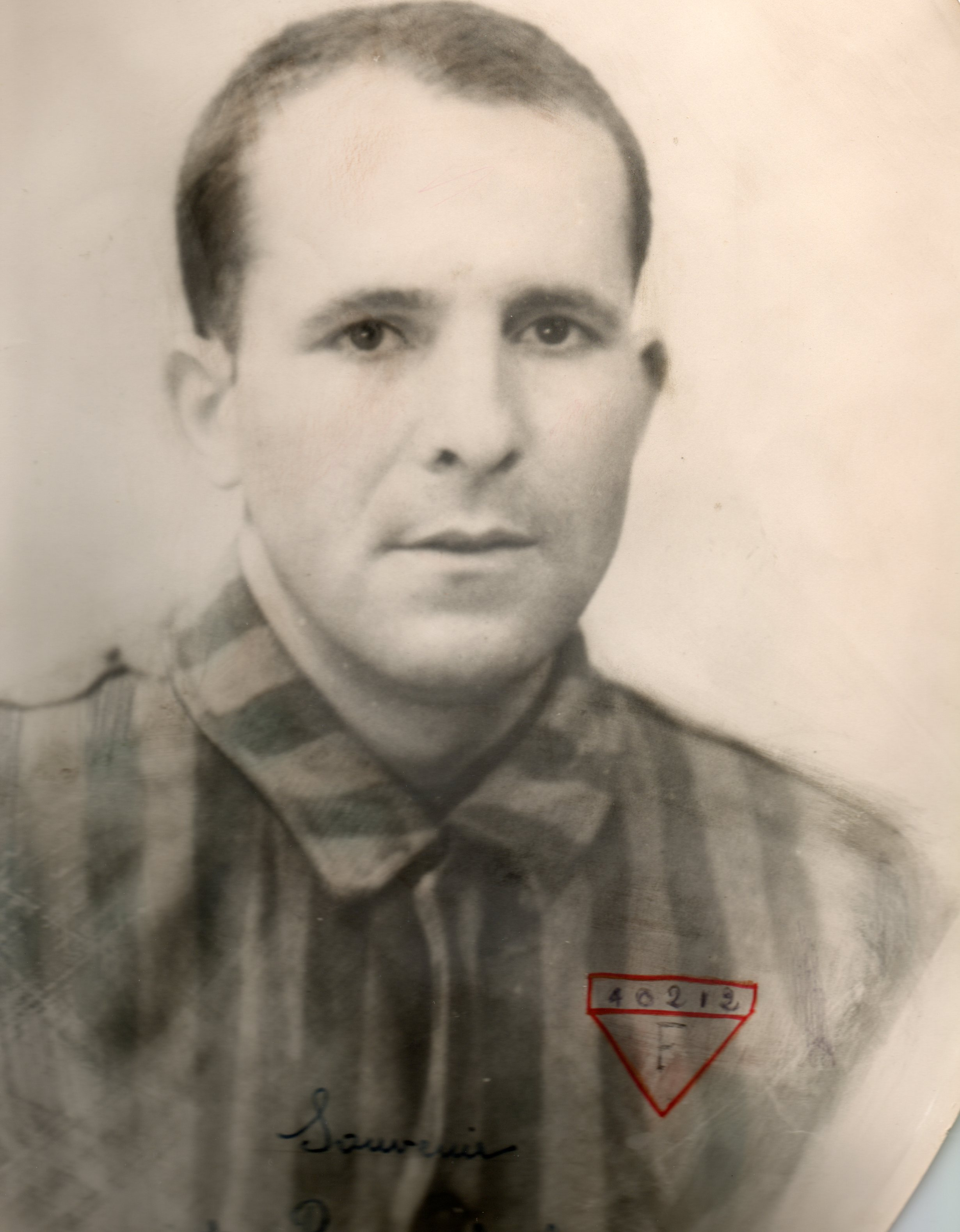
Djaafar Khemdoudi in his Neuengamme clothes

Mohammed Helmy was one of those Egyptians, a doctor who was fired from his hospital and banned from practicing medicine for being a "Hamite", an old term referring to black people. He was also barred from marrying his German fiancé due to his race. The Egyptian government was able to secure his release due to his ill health. Despite being targeted by the regime, he helped foreign workers and Germans avoid conscription and hid a Jewish patient, Anna Boros, during the war. He obtained documents to protect Boros, including a certificate of her conversion to Islam and a marriage certificate. Helmy also assisted Boros' family by finding hiding places for them. He later became the first Arab Righteous Among Nations.

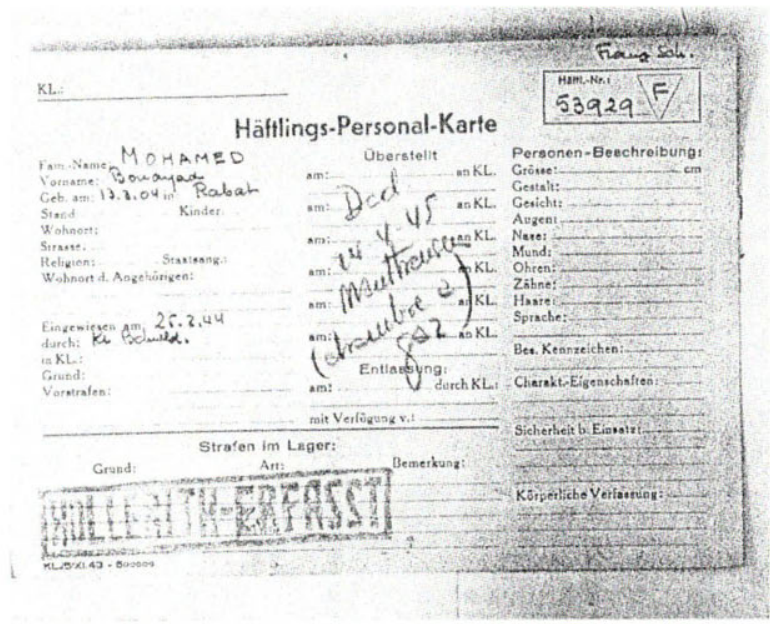
Death certificate of Mohamed Bouayad, a Moroccan who was killed in a gas chamber in Mauthausen in April 1945.

Hans Hauck was born in Frankfurt in 1920. Since his father was Algerian, he was persecuted for being half-Arab. At the age of 17, he was summoned by the Gestapo and was sterilized. Lucie M., a 14-year-old, was sent in 1943 to Ravensbrück concentration camp for being a "Moroccan half-breed". The Nazis sterilized hundreds of "half-breeds", Germans mixed with Maghrebi Arabs.

The Arab collaborators with Nazi Germany, Amin al-Husseini and Rashid Ali al-Gailani, were aware of the Arab inmates, yet did nothing to free them. Al-Husseini refused to intervene when a Palestinian called Boutros S. was arrested for "political expressions" and sent to a work camp near Berlin. In December 1943, an Iraqi student Sayd Daud Y was arrested for helping the desertion of his future brother-in-law, a grenadier in the Wehrmacht. Daud was engaged to the soldier's sister and had a child with her, but for "racial considerations" was not allowed to marry her. His brother tried to help him by appealing to al-Kailānī and to the Grand Mufti to intervene, though they refused to help. He was brought to Dachau in April 1945.

Arabs who participated in the resistance were persecuted the worst, such as the Arab members of the French communist group 'Bataillons De La Jeunesse'. The Lebanese Antoine Hajje was murdered by the Nazis for participating in the communist resistance. In his final letter, he wrote:

"I have just arrived from the Royallieu Camp with our colleagues Pitard and Rolnikas, to the German section of the Health Prison.

An officer informed us that by order of higher authority we will be shot this morning as hostages. We protested, but in vain. We go to death, satisfied with having, in all circumstances, fulfilled our duty, all our duty. We are struck by fate, and fate is, alas, unjust. We die prematurely, but it is for France.We are proud of it.

By addressing this word to you, I say goodbye to a profession that I loved; I will have been, until the end, the defender of human dignity and truth.

Essaid Haddad, Mohamed Thami-Lakhdar and Mohamed Sliman, all of whom were active resistance members, were also killed. Mohamed Sliman came from Algeria and worked as a nurse in Paris. He was a father of five and belonged to the "Diot" resistance group of the "Organization Spéciale". After the start of the war, like many other Arabs, he participated in the armed resistance against Nazi rule. He was arrested and shot in La Santé prison on 1 August 1942. Lakhdar was a member of the Francs-Tireurs et Partisans and was arrested after distributing leaflets on January 1, 1943. Mohamed Lattab, an Algerian, was interned at Compiègne, later sent to Auschwitz on July 6, 1942, where he was murdered on March 5, 1943 – his prisoner number was 45730. The Moroccan Fremdarbeiter Abdallah ben Ahmed and Salem Ammamouche were convicted of forgery and trafficking with food stamps. The former died of tuberculosis in the Brandenburg jail in March 1944, and the later was executed in Plötzensee in mid-April 1945. Djaafar Khemdoudi was sentenced to Neuengamme for saving Jews in Lyon, with the help of Bel Hadj El Maafi. Mohamed Saïl was an anarchist, anti-fascist and anti-colonialist Algerian Kabyle. He volunteered for the republicans in the Spanish civil war and was later arrested in Nazi occupied France, escaping to join the French resistance.

In total, the historian Gerhard Höpp has confirmed the existence of more than 450 Arab inmates in Nazi concentration camps, including Auschwitz (34), (Note: The Auschwitz Memorial and Museum puts the number of Muslims at 58, but this includes Muslim Soviets prisoners of war "Which Religious Denominations Did the People Deported to Auschwitz Belong To?". www.auschwitz.org. 24 April 2006. A text search on MemArc, a website dedicated to archiving the names of victims of the Holocaust, returns 109 results for the search "Moamed OR Mohammed OR Mohamed OR Mohamet OR Mehmed") Bergen-Belsen (21), Buchenwald (148), Dachau (84), Flossenburg (39), Gross-Rosen (12), Hinzert (3), Mauthausen (62), Mittelbau-Dora (39), Natzweiler (37), Neuengamme (110 – 73 at the Alderney satellite camp), Ravensbruck (25), Sachsenhausen (42) and others. Most of the inmates were Algerians who were living in France, and were used for Nazi slave labor. One in five Arabs did not survive the camps, and one – a Moroccan named Mohamed Bouayad – was killed in a gas chamber at Mauthausen only eleven days before its liberation.

Testimony from Holocaust survivors give insight into how Arab prisoners were treated. One former Polish prisoner of war recalled:

"It seldom occurred that a Pole or Frenchman was beaten; Moroccans were treated worse and Jews the worst."

Josef R., a former prisoner in Sachsenhausen, testified in 1966, about an "Arab who couldn't speak any German at all" called "Ali":

"It was a cold winter and 'Ali' had to stand for hours outdoors, where cold water was poured over him and he was punched and kicked. 'Ali' was about 45 years old at that time and it was surely more than he could take. But I don't know which SS man did that to 'Ali' at that time."

Arabs were involved in the Buchenwald Resistance. The Algerians Kermiche Areski and Messaoud ben Hamiche belonged to the "Brigade française d'Action liberatrice" that formed in the camp in June 1944. On April 11, 1945, the brigade took part in the prisoners' armed revolt that made it possible to transfer the camp to the American troops.

===== Connection between the Holocaust and the Libyan Genocide =====
There are ample direct connections between the Libyan genocide and the Holocaust. Italian-sponsored Arabic language publications, most notably "Libya al-Musawara", and films from the colonial period indicate numerous visits to Libya by officials from Nazi Germany. Historian Ali Abdullatif Ahmida stated that the extreme violence carried out against Libyans by Italian fascists served as a blueprint for the atrocities that Nazi Germany later committed in Europe.

In April 1939, German Field Marshal Hermann Göring made an official visit to Tripoli, where he held discussions with the Italian colonial governor general of Libya, Italo Balbo. Upon witnessing the cleansing of indigenous people and the settling of 20,000 Italian peasants, he described the process as "successful" and used it as inspiration for Generalplan Ost, the planned German settler colonization and genocide of Eastern Europe. Hermann Göring would later be in charge of the first ever Nazi concentration camp. Also in 1939, Heinrich Himmler, the head of the Schutzstaffel and the architect behind the concentration camps, also made an official visit to Libya to witness the outcomes of the Italian methods. He is credited with conceiving the idea of the Final Solution.

Historian Patrick Bernhard notes that the Nazi Commissariat organised special programmes to visit the Libyan colony. Visits to Tripoli occurred in 1937 and 1938 by high Nazi leaders such as Robert Ley, Rudolf Hess, the head of the SS Heinrich Himmler, and Marshal Hermann Göring. This led to the signing of an agreement to train 150 SS officers in the Italian Colonial School in Tivoli or Rome in 1937. Additionally, German state officials began an active program of fieldwork, examining the Italian colonial experience, contacting Italian officials and conducting fieldwork visits to Italy and the colony of Libya between 1938 and 1941, with numerous German books and press articles published during this time.

=== Support for Arab movements pre-World War II ===
The extent to which Nazi Germany supported pre-war Arab movements is unclear. German foreign party favored an alliance the British in the 1930s and refused to interfere in their sphere of influence. Heinrich Wolff, the then German Consul General of Jerusalem, refused a deal in 1934 with Amir Abdullah of Jordan to seek cooperation with Arab issues. The German foreign office refused to arrange a meeting with the Syrian nationalist Shekib Arslan and Hitler, concluding that "Germany cannot support the Arabs with money or with arms." In 1935, Fritz Grobba, the German Ambassador to Iraq, met with a Pan-Arab committee in Baghdad to arrange close cooperation. While Grobba verbally gave the Arabs his best wishes, he rejected any material support at the time – later receiving a telegraph from Berlin instructing him to:

"[Please] avoid any connection with said group or its representatives. We want nothing to do with these efforts. Exchange of information is out of the question".

The German consulate in Beirut around the same time had a similar policy regarding the hostilities between the French colonists and the Arabs in the region:

We must make every effort to avoid anything which might be construed as taking advantage of the situation by attempting to make common cause with the pan-islamic Nationalists.

Nazi Germany was neutral regarding the 1936 Palestine revolt. Soon after the outbreak of the revolt, in December 1936, Germany was approached by the rebel commander Fawzi al-Qawuqji and in January 1937 by representatives of the Arab Higher Committee, both requesting arms and money, but again in vain. In July al-Husayni himself approached Heinrich Doehle, new general counsel of Jerusalem, to request support for the "battle against the Jews". Doehle found that Germany's hesitation in supporting the rebels had caused pro-German sentiment among Palestinian Arabs to waver. Some limited German funding for the revolt can be dated to around the summer of 1938 and was perhaps related to a goal of distracting the British from the ongoing occupation of Czechoslovakia. The Abwehr gave money to al-Husayni and other sums were funneled via Saudi Arabia.

Germany's approach to the region was driven primarily by pragmatic strategic considerations rather than religious ideology. In 1941, the German Foreign Office noted the need to distinguish between religious and political motives in its outreach:

The Islamic concept of Holy War cannot be applied with the current distribution of powers. Arabism and Islam are not congruent. The Arabs that we have to take into account do not fight in favor of religious, but political goals. Matters of Islam need to be dealt with in a tactful manner.

=== Nazi propaganda for the Arab World ===
During the war, Nazi Germany launched a massive propaganda campaign for the Arab world. This propaganda portrayed Germany as a "savior" of Arabs from colonialism, while relying heavily on anti-Jewish verses in the Quran to incite antisemitism in the region. Radio Berlin and Radio Bari in Italy broadcast defeatist messages to the region in the hope of triggering an Arab revolt.

For example, Nazi Germany, through its propagandist Wolfgang Diewerge, attempted to spread antisemitism in Egypt as early as the 1930s, to "counter Jewish influence" – really to pressure the Egyptian government to crack down on local Jewish anti-Nazi activities. So called "Jewish influence" was, according one German lawyer, so strong that:

"[N]ewspapers simply are not prepared to publish any articles that might be in any way offensive to the Jews. You always have to keep in mind that Jewish influence is much greater than German influence, and that here much more so than anywhere else where material interest alone decides. ... The educational level of the broad masses is not advanced enough for them to understand racial theory. The awareness of the Jewish danger has not been roused here as yet.

The Cairo Ortsgruppe concluded:

"[O]ne has to start with the issue where real conflicts of interest exist between Arabs and Jews: Palestine. The antagonism between Arabs and Jews existing there has to be transplanted to Egypt."

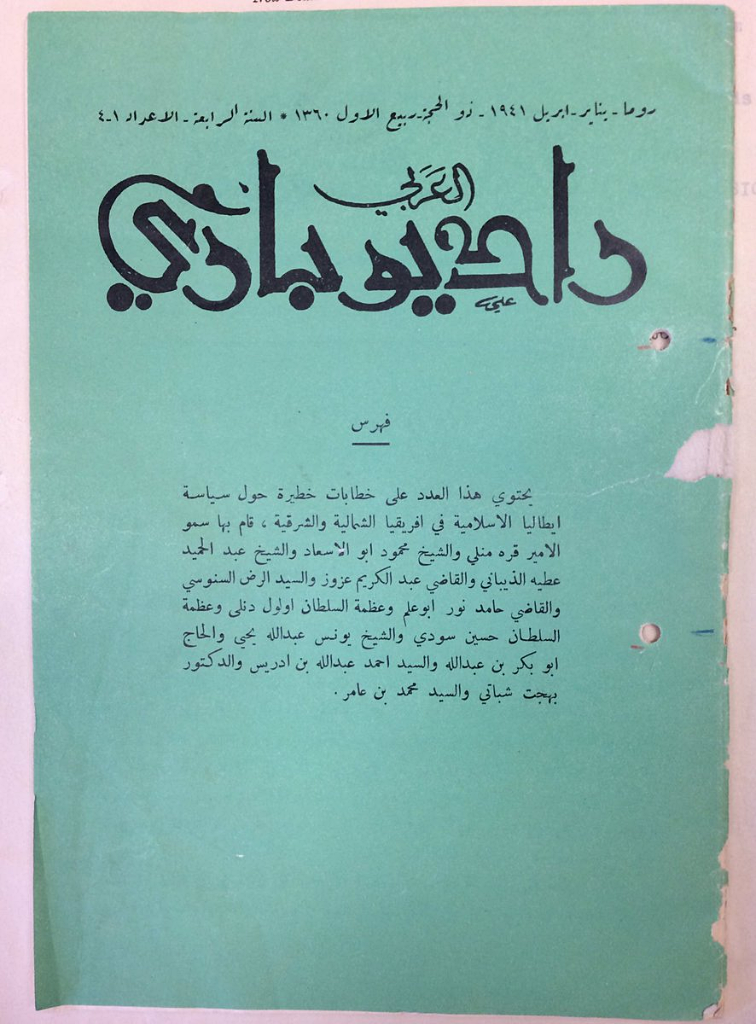
Radio Araba di Bari January – April 1941, a supplementary magazine produced by Radio Bari with details of its Arabic broadcasts

One broadcast to Egypt announced during the war:

In the face of this barbaric procedure by the British we think it best, if the life of the Egyptian nation is to be saved, that the Egyptians rise as one man to kill the Jews before they have a chance of betraying the Egyptian people. It is the duty of the Egyptians to annihilate the Jews and to destroy their property. Egypt can never forget that it is the Jews who are carrying out Britain's imperialist policy in the Arab countries and that they are the source of all the disasters, which have befallen the countries of the East. The Jews aim at extending their domination throughout the Arab countries, but their future depends on a British victory. That is why they are trying to save Britain from her fate and why Britain is arming them to kill the Arabs and save the British Empire.

You must kill the Jews, before they open fire on you. Kill the Jews, who have appropriated your wealth and who are plotting against your security. Arabs of Syria, Iraq and Palestine, what are you waiting for? The Jews are planning to violate your women, to kill your children and to destroy you. According to the Moslem religion, the defense of your life is a duty which can only be fulfilled by annihilating the Jews. This is your best opportunity to get rid of this dirty race, which has usurped your rights and brought misfortune and destruction on your countries. Kill the Jews, burn their property, destroy their stores, annihilate these base supporters of British imperialism. Your sole hope of salvation lies in annihilating the Jews before they annihilate you.

The impact of these broadcasts have been called into question, specifically on whether they caused or were in some way responsible for a rise in radical antisemitic hatred post-war. The historian Joel Beinin questions the conclusions of Jeffrey Herf – author of Nazi Propaganda in the Arab World – stating that there were few radios in the Arab World, most owned by Jews or Allied troops. For example, Herf argues that Sayyid Qutb, an Islamist who is commonly attributed to be an inspiration for radical Islam, could have been radicalized by listening to Nazi propaganda during this time in Egypt during the war. Beinin disagrees, arguing that evidence for Qutb's antisemitism and increasing radicalism does not exists until – at earliest – 1948, the beginning of the Arab-Israeli conflict; therefore Herf's suggestion of a Nazi inspired Qutb is simply conjecture.

In 1943 a radio poll was conducted on Palestinian listeners. Of the 1,516 listeners interviewed, only 13% tuned into the Berlin station (8 percent listened only once a month, 4 percent daily, 1 percent listened twice a day, none listened three times), with the majority preferring Cairo (98%), Jerusalem (98%), London (87%), Sharq al-Adna (93%), Beirut (66%), and Ankara (32%). The Berlin station also received the worst credibility rating of all the stations; interviewers explained they only tuned in to listen to the music programs. In 1943 the British foreign Office reported that Axis propaganda in Egypt had, "on the whole, surprisingly little effect." One British official, during his visit to Egypt, concluded that most Egyptians enjoyed listening to local Egyptian stations, and that "German broadcasts are immediately switched off as being offensive rubbish".

In his political testament, Hitler complained that Italy's colonies in the Libya and East Africa, and Nazi support for French colonies in North Africa, harmed the Axis cause in Muslim countries, and that Nazi anticolonial policy had been insufficient and disastrous.

== Arab world perceptions of Hitler and Nazism ==
Some believed that the Germans would help them gain their independence from French and British rule. After France's defeat by Nazi Germany in 1940, some Arabs were making public chants against the French and British in the streets of Damascus: "No more Monsieur, no more Mister, Allah's in Heaven and Hitler's on earth." Posters in Arabic stating "In heaven God is your ruler, on earth Hitler" were frequently displayed in shops in the towns of Syria.

The two most noted Arab politicians who actively collaborated with the Nazis were the Grand Mufti of Jerusalem, Amin al-Husseini, and the Iraqi prime minister Rashid Ali al-Gaylani.

The British sent Amin al-Husseini into exile for his role in the Palestinian revolt of 1936–39. The ex-Mufti had agents in the Kingdom of Iraq, the French Mandate of Syria and in Mandatory Palestine. In 1941, al-Husseini actively supported the Iraqi Golden Square coup d'état, led by Rashid Ali al-Gaylani.

After the Golden Square Iraqi regime was defeated by British forces and Assyrian levies, Rashid Ali, al-Husseini and other pro Nazi Iraqi veterans took refuge in Europe, where they supported Axis interests. They were particularly successful in recruiting several tens-of-thousands of Muslims for membership in German Schutzstaffel (SS) units, and as propagandists for the Arabic-speaking world. The range of collaborative activities was wide. For instance, Anwar Sadat, who later became president of Egypt, was a willing co-operator in Nazi Germany's espionage according to his own memoirs. Hitler met with Amin al-Husseini on 28 November 1941. The official German notes of that meeting contain numerous references to combating Jews both inside and outside Europe. The following excerpts from that meeting are statements from Hitler to al-Husseini:

Germany stood for uncompromising war against the Jews. That naturally included active opposition to the Jewish national home in Palestine, which was nothing other than a center, in the form of a state, for the exercise of destructive influence by Jewish interests. ... This was the decisive struggle; on the political plane, it presented itself in the main as a conflict between Germany and England, but ideologically it was a battle between National Socialism and the Jews. It went without saying that Germany would furnish positive and practical aid to the Arabs involved in the same struggle, because platonic promises were useless in a war for survival or destruction in which the Jews were able to mobilize all of England's power for their ends....the Fuhrer would on his own give the Arab world the assurance that its hour of liberation had arrived. Germany's objective would then be solely the destruction of the Jewish element residing in the Arab sphere under the protection of British power. In that hour the Mufti would be the most authoritative spokesman for the Arab world. It would then be his task to set off the Arab operations, which he had secretly prepared. When that time had come, Germany could also be indifferent to French reaction to such a declaration.

Amin al-Husseini became the most prominent Arab collaborator with the Axis powers. He developed friendships with high-ranking Nazis, including Heinrich Himmler, Joachim von Ribbentrop, and (possibly) Adolf Eichmann. He contributed to Axis propaganda services and he also contributed to the recruitment of both Arab Muslim and non-Arab Muslim soldiers for the Nazi armed forces, including three SS divisions which consisted of Bosnian Muslims. He was involved in planning "wartime operations directed against Palestine and Iraq, including parachuting Germans and Arab agents to foment attacks against the Jews in Palestine." He assisted the German entry into North Africa, particularly the German entry into Tunisia and Libya. His espionage network provided the Wehrmacht with a forty-eight-hour warning of the Allied invasion of North Africa. The Wehrmacht, however, ignored this information, which turned out to be completely accurate. He intervened and protested to government authorities in order to prevent Jews from emigrating to Mandatory Palestine. There is persuasive evidence that he was aware of the Nazi Final Solution. After the war ended, he claimed that he never knew about the extermination camps and he also claimed that he never knew about Nazi plans to commit genocide against European Jews, he also claimed that the evidence which was used against him was forged by his Jewish enemies, and he even denied the authenticity of the evidence which proved that he had met Eichmann. He is still a controversial figure, he is both vilified and honored by different political factions in the contemporary Arab world.

Researchers like Jeffrey Herf, Meir Zamir, and Hans Goldenbaum agree on the importance of the German propaganda effort in the Middle East and North Africa. But the latest research on the massive and influential radio broadcasts was able to prove "that the texts were supplied by German personnel and not, as sometimes believed, by the reader[s] of the Arabic broadcasts [...]". Furthermore, Goldenbaum concludes "that the man who was long regarded as the Reich's most important Muslim of all, Mohammed Amin al-Husseini, the Mufti of Jerusalem, did not play any particularly important role in this case. Despite the fact that his Arabic speeches were broadcast by Radio Berlin and he was always presented as a role model, al-Husseini did not have any influence on the broadcast content. The Arabs in general did not seem to have been partners with equal rights. Instead they were secondary recipients of propaganda and orders, Goldenbaum concluded. Cooperation never went beyond the emphasized common battle against colonialism."

=== Kurdistan ===
Views of Nazi Germany differed among Kurds. Some saw Nazi Germany as an ally that could help establish an independent Kurdistan due to Nazi Germany hostilities against British and French forces in the Middle East while others fought along allied forces both within the Middle East theatre of World War II and Europe, notably with British and Soviet forces in a variety of military roles.

=== Algeria ===
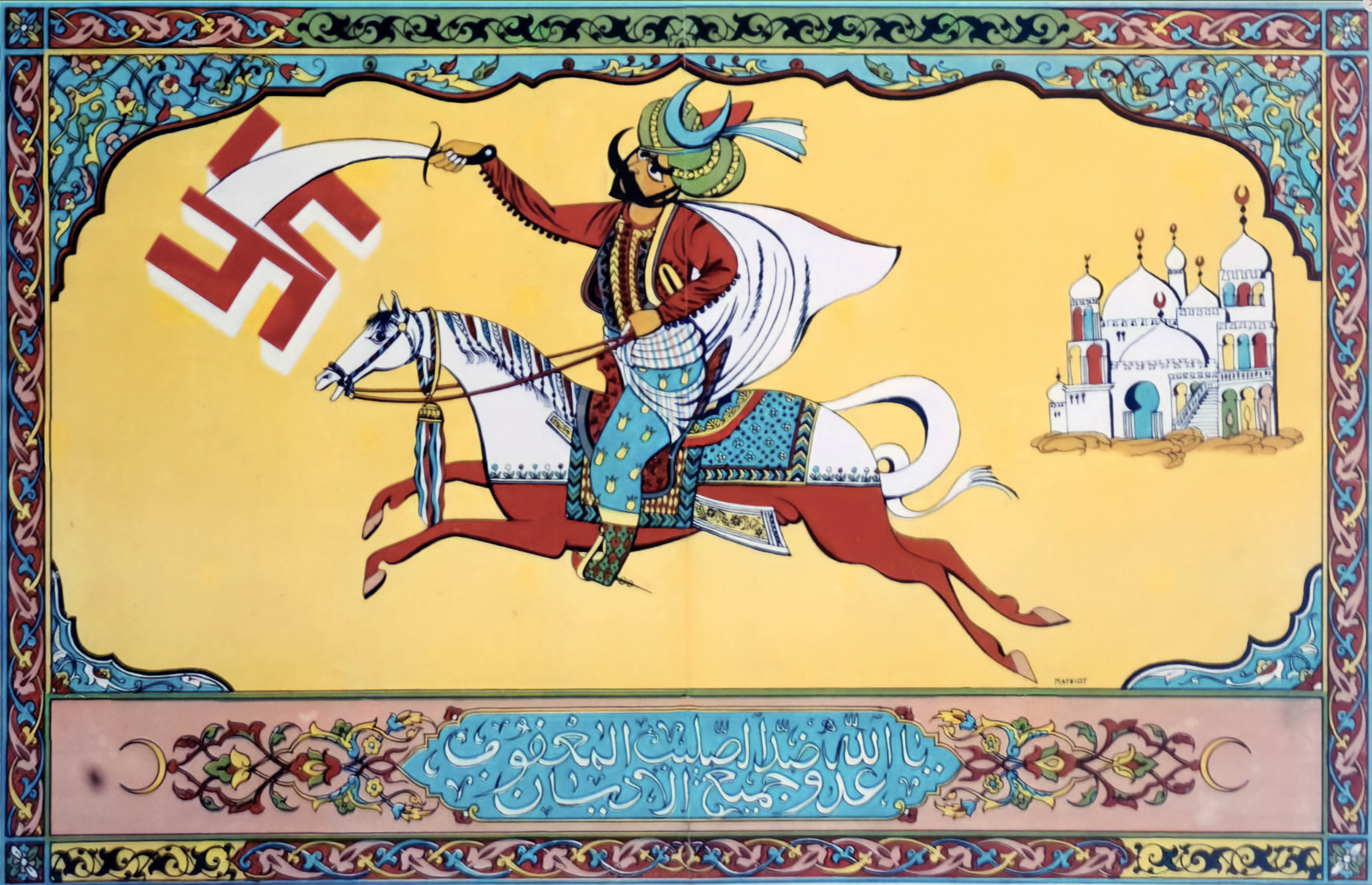
The poster was printed in the Algerian journal an-Nasr (Triumph) in June 1943. It depicts Saladin slaying Nazism. The text reads, "By God, against the hooked cross, the enemy of all religions".

French colonialism in North Algeria began in the 1830s, solidifying in the 1870s. Algeria had been integrated into France since 1848, but few Algerians had been granted French citizenship. Algerian Jews were officially French citizens ever since the 1870 Crémieux Decree. In Morocco and Tunisia, which were protectorates of France, Jews were considered subjects of the sultan and bey. Antisemitism in France was a growing movement among French political elites. One of the worst cases was in 1870, during the Dreyfus affair, when Alfred Dreyfus, a captain of Jewish heritage, was convicted of treason with forged documents. According to historian Bernard Lewis, Muslims generally sided with Dreyfus. Antisemitism, which had existed in the Muslim world long before, was influenced in many ways due to an importing of French antisemitism.

It was during this time, in the 1920s, when the International League Against Anti-Semitism (LICA) was founded by Bernard Lecache. Some Muslim reformers agreed with Lecache, among them Abdelhamid Ben Badis, Mohammed Salah Bendjelloul, and Sheikh Tayeb El-Okbi. Lecache believed in Arab-Jewish reconciliation against rising inter-communal tensions. El-Okbi would later say that "LICA is the true incarnation of the Islamic spirit. The Qur'an says that humans are born brothers and that Islam does not make a difference between races. True Muslims do not belittle other races. They are against hatred of people, injustice and inequality." Some of these Muslim intellectuals were criticized for allying with Jewish leaders and calling for Muslim-Jewish collaboration.

In 1939, Abder-Rahmane Fitrawe published Le racisme et l'Islam ("Racism and Islam") which sought to illustrate the threat of Nazism and fascism by arguing that they went against the teachings of Islam. The pamphlet consisted illustrations to alert the Muslim community of Nazism and fascism, with excerpts of Mein Kampf in both Arabic and French. In the preface to the book, he wrote:

A Muslim cannot accept this doctrine so contrary to the teachings of his religion; he cannot give his sympathy to the Third Reich which officially proclaims: Law is what benefits the German people. Hitler and Mussolini are the two marabouts of an identical doctrine and the illustrations which follow will show the terrible consequences that a victory of German or Italian racism would have for the world of Islam. By defending its rights in Africa, France defends its subjects; she doesn't want them to become slaves to racism.

On 20 January 1942, 15 high-ranking Nazi Party and German government officials met at a villa in Wannsee, a Berlin suburb, to coordinate the execution of the "Final Solution" (Endlösung) of the "Jewish question". At this Wannsee Conference, Reinhard Heydrich, Heinrich Himmler's deputy and head of the Reichssicherheitshauptamt (Reich Security Main Office, or RSHA), noted the numbers of Jews to be eliminated in each territory. In the notation for France there are two entries, 165,000 for Occupied France, and 700,000 for the Unoccupied Zone, which included France's North African possessions, i.e. Morocco, Algeria and Tunisia. The SS had established a special unit of 22 people in 1942 "to Kill Jews in North Africa". It was led by the SS functionary Walter Rauff, who helped develop the mobile gassing vehicles the Germans used to murder Russian prisoners and Jewish people in Russia and Poland. A network of labor camps was established in Tunisia, Algeria, and Morocco. In 1941, some Jews joined anti-Nazi underground rebel movements. Many of these Jews were caught and sent to labor camps or executed. Algerian Jewish survivors were the last to receive compensation from Germany for the Holocaust.

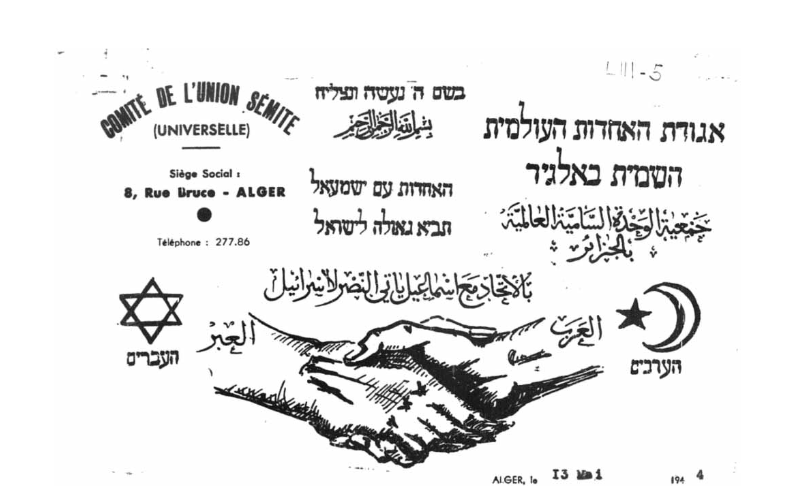
An advertisement for the Comité de L'Union Sémite shows a Jewish–Arab handshake. Captions in both Hebrew and Arabic say "Unity with Ishmael will bring redemption to Israel".

After the fall of France, the Vichy French regime abolished the Crémieux Decree, a decree which granted Algerian Jews French citizenship but did not grant Algerian Muslims French citizenship. The abolition of the Crémieux Decree served as the legal basis for the antisemitic laws which were enforced by the regime. The French fascists thought that by abolishing this decree, they would increase their popularity among Muslim nationalists in Algeria, which did not occur. The Algerian nationalist Ferhat Abbas responded: "Your [French] racism runs in all direction, today against the Jews, and always against the Arabs." Messali Hadj, founder of the Algerian People's Party, wrote: "[This] cannot be considered as progress for the Algerian people – lowering the rights of Jews did not increase the rights of Muslims." While Hadj was imprisoned, he refused a deal for his release if he wrote a declaration in support of the French fascist collaborator Marshal Pétain. As a result, he was sentenced to sixteen years of hard labor, was banned from visiting France for twenty years, and had all of his property confiscated. Dr. Boumendjel, an Algerian politician, in a letter to local Jewish leaders, wrote:

I can assure you that, in general, the Muslims have understood that it would be inappropriate for them to rejoice in the special measures of which the Jews of Algeria are the victims. They cannot reasonably get behind those who are attempting to practice a racial policy when they themselves are struck down on a daily basis in the name of racism. Our adversaries did not suspect that in making the Jews inferior, they could only bring them closer to the Muslims. Most of them believed that the Muslims would be delighted with the abrogation of the Crémieux decree, whereas they may simply have realized that a citizenship that can be withdrawn after seventy years of being exercised was questionable, through the fault of the very ones who had granted it.... They refuse to be "overgrown children," dupes, or bargaining chips.

Tayeb el-Okbi was a member of the Algerian Islah (Reform) Party, and he was also a friend of the prominent Algerian reformist Abdelhamid Ben Badis, who was tolerant of different religions and cultures. When he discovered that the leaders of the pro-fascist group, the Légion Français des Combattants, were planning to commit a pogrom against Jews with the help of Muslim troops, he issued a fatwa ordering Muslims not to attack Jews. His actions were compared to French Archbishops Jules-Géraud Saliège and Pierre-Marie Gerlier, whose efforts saved scores of Jews in Europe, though he took more personal risk as a Muslim in the French colony.

In 1941, Vichy France ordered the confiscation of the property of the Jews. However, in a sign of solidarity, not a single Muslim Algerian took advantage of the law by purchasing confiscated Jewish property; on a Friday in 1941, religious leaders throughout Algiers delivered sermons in which they warned Muslims against participation in schemes to strip Jews of their property.

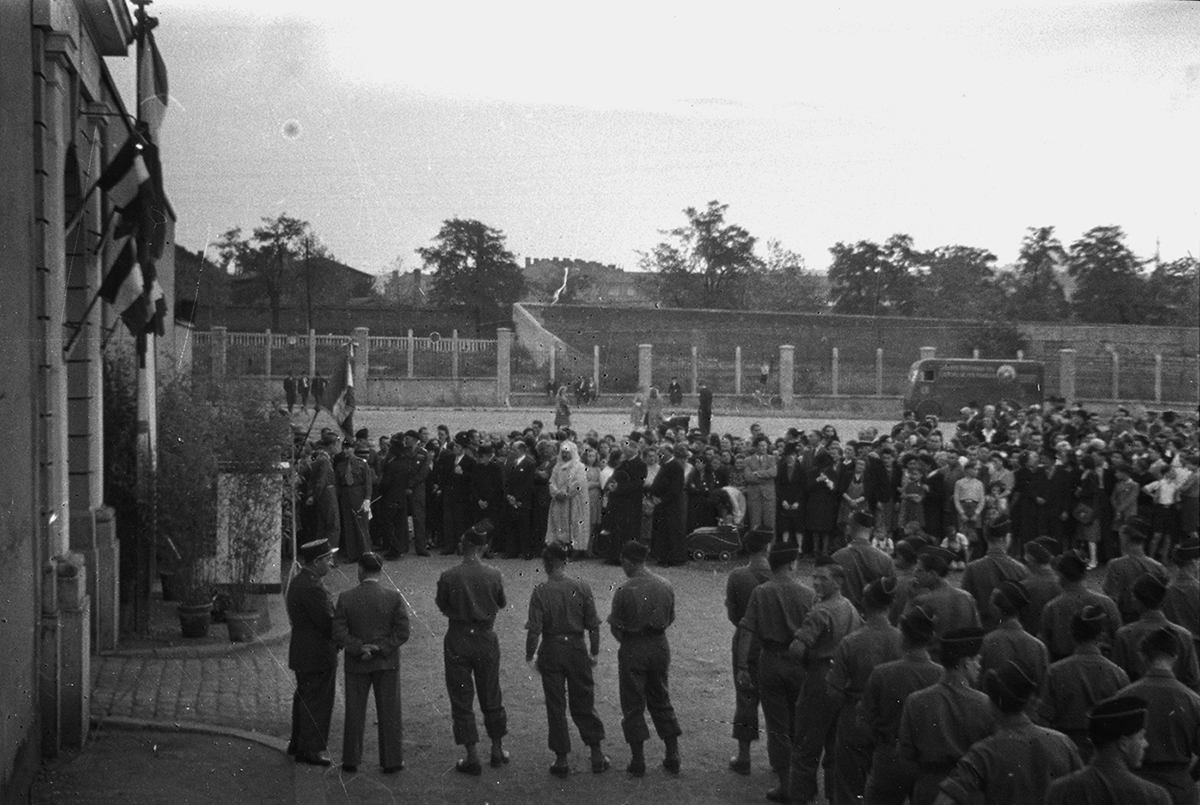
Imam Bel Hadj El Maafi (in white) in 1947, in front of the Montluc prison, during a commemoration of the French Resistance.

José Aboulker, a French Algerian Jew and the leader of the anti-Nazi resistance in French Algeria, praised the restraint of the Arabs:

The Arabs do not participate [in the fight against Vichy]. It is not their war. But, as regards the Jews, they are perfect. The [Vichy] functionaries [and] the German agents try to push them into demonstrations and pogroms. In vain. When Jewish goods were put up for public auction, an instruction went around the mosques: "Our brothers are suffering misfortune. Do not take their goods." Not one Arab became an administrator [of property] either. Do you know other examples of such an admirable, collective dignity?

While the Algerian Muslim political elite did at times express displeasure at the increasing antisemitism of French officials, ultimately Algerian politicians tried to avoid direct conflict with the Vichy regime over the 'Jewish Question'. A French report dated September 14, 1940, quotes a local Muslim leader:

"We do not wish to be the instruments to others' grievances, because we would only have to bear the consequences; Satan continues to excite the French against the Jews, we'll just be spectators."

In the same year, the Vichy Regime imposed a two percent quota for Jews in the medical profession. In response, Marcel Lūfranī, an Algerian Jewish doctor, and two of his Muslim colleagues – Saʿadān and Būmalī – created a petition demanding the reinstatement of Algerian Jewish doctors. It was later signed by Mohammed Saleh Bendjelloul, Drs. Ghudbān, Bensmāyya, and Ferhat Abbas. According to historians Michael Marrus and Robert Paxton, the anti-Jewish campaign in Algeria was not a concession to Muslim pressures. Instead, Western-educated Muslim leaders and regional representatives opposed the measures and supported restoring the Crémieux decree, noting that rights easily revoked by authorities were of dubious value. In contrast, the European settler population actively fought to keep anti-Jewish legislation in place even after Allied forces arrived in November 1942.

According to Robert Satloff, in World War II, only one Arab in North Africa, Hassan Ferjani, was convicted for performing actions that led to the deaths of Jews by an Allied military tribunal, while many other Arabs acted to save Jews. Algerian religious leaders Si Kaddour Benghabrit and Abdelkader Mesli hid and saved Jews in the basements of the Grand Mosque of Paris. Mesli was later sent to Dachau and later Mauthausen. In Paris, a handwritten note written in Kabyle said:

Yesterday evening, the Jews of Paris were arrested – the elderly, women, and children. In exile like us, workers like us, these are our brothers. Their children are like our children. If you encounter one of their children, you must give him asylum and protection until the time that the misfortune – or the sorrow – passes. Oh, man of my country, your heart is generous.

In the French city of Lyon, the imam of the city, Bel Hadj El Maafi, joined the French Resistance and protected the Jews of Saint-Fons and Vénissieux, helped by Djaafar Khemdoudi. Between 200,000 and 250,000 North African Muslims served in the French armies on the Allied side. In the metropole, a group called Future of North Africa called on Muslims to join the Allies:

Men who you have always known to be devoted to the North African cause are now [on our side]. They call you to holy war against the enemy of Islam, against the enemy of humanity, Hitler and the Nazi regime.

The historian Haim Saadon opines that bar some exceptions, there was no violence against Jews by Muslims and although there was no particular sense of camaraderie between Jews and Muslims, they treated each other quite well.

==== Mohammed Arezki Berkani ====
Mohammed Arezki Berkani was an Algerian nationalist who was an active member of Étoile Nord-Africaine (North African Star) and the Algerian People's Party. Because of his activities, he was imprisoned by the Vichy French authorities in 1941, along with the Algerian communist Larbi Bouhali, at the Djenien-Bou-Rezg concentration camp. Berkani's memoirs are unique in that they provide an insight into life as a Muslim in a French concentration camp alongside Jews. He documents how camp authorities tried to provoke conflict between Jewish and Muslim internees with the intention of seeing "Jews slaughtered by Muslims," but the plan backfired when the two groups rejected the provocation and became "brothers in hunger, suffering, misery, sorrow."

=== Egypt ===
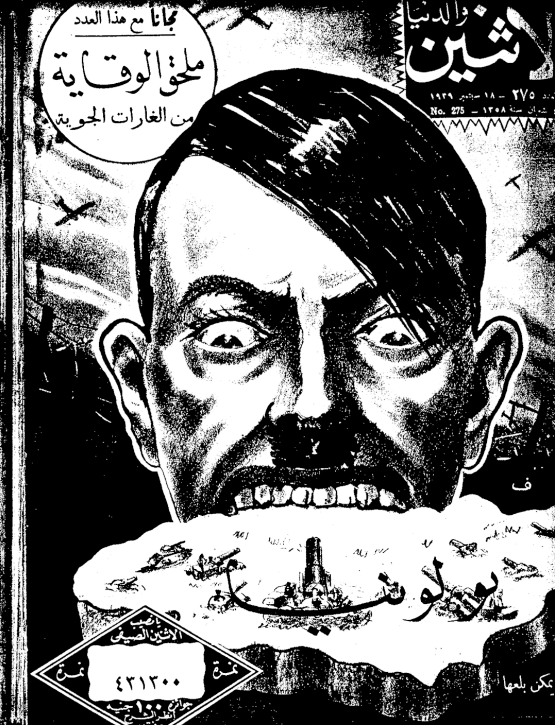
The Egyptian paper Al-Ithnayn wa al-Dunya mistakenly believed that Hitler would not be able to conquer Poland and would be stuck there. "He cannot swallow it." September 18, 1939

Fascism was denounced by many in Egyptian society. The Egyptian newspaper al-Ahram denounced Italy's invasion of Ethiopia, criticizing not just the brutal Italian conquest, but the world for allowing a League of Nations member to be invaded. The paper also denounced Germany's aggressive expansion before the war. The weekly Ar-risala had articles that denounced Hitler, such as a 1939 editorial that said: "Nazism by its very nature is contradictory to freedom of expression and freedom of opinion; it is based on the rule of force" and "The competition between fascism and Hitlerism is for the enslavement of people", as well as other articles criticizing the treatment of women by fascist regimes. Ahmad Hasan al-Zayyat, while he worked as an editor for Ar-risala, wrote scathing articles on Hitler and fascism. 'Abd al-Mun'am Khallaf denounced the notion of "death for the nation's sake" and argued that Islam did not value ethnicity or race but rather mercy and compassion. The newspaper Al Muqattam produced articles which criticized Nazi racial ideology and its antisemitism. The Egyptian cultural and literature magazine al-Hilal compared Nazi Germany to Sparta, not as a compliment, but to criticize the "disintegration of the individual", arguing that Athenian values of enlightenment and democracy outlasted the failed city-state of Sparta.

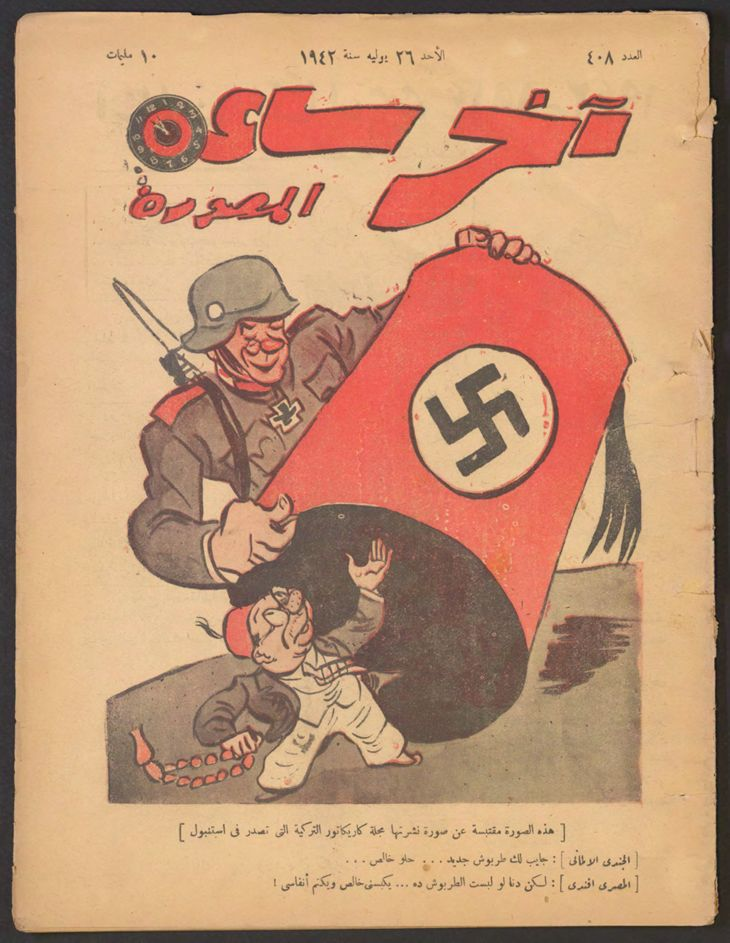
Nazi: "I brought you a new fez!" Masri Effendi (Caricature of Egypt): "But this fez will crush me and take my breath away!" From Ākhir sāʼah – 26th of July, 1942

Taha Hussein, the famous Egyptian academic and twenty-three time Nobel Prize in Literature nominee, criticized the lack of freedom of thought in Nazi Germany, writing "They live like a society of insects. They must behave like ants in an anthill or like bees in a hive." Hussein disagreed with neutrality, urging the Egyptians to fight the Germans in the war. In 1940, he wrote a book review of Hermann Rauschning's Hitler Speaks, declaring:

Hitler is an intellectually limited man who does not like to delve deeply into problems or to reflect in any depth. He hates books and culture, he is superbly ignorant about what science and experience could offer him, and he resorts only to wild fantasies that have no precise aim. He has only contempt for philosophers, politicians, and thinkers. He thinks he has come into existence to lead Germany, and with it the world, toward a new phase of their destiny... I give thanks to God that I did not wait until the declaration of war to hate Hitler and his regime. In fact, I have hated them both since they made their appearance; I have resisted them with all my strength. I have always envisioned Hitler as a man whose conscience drips with blood, who considers nothing respectable or sacred, an enemy of the spirit, of humanity, of all the ideals of civilization. And now his acts and words confirm in everyone's eyes what I had understood from the beginning of his fateful rise. It is therefore a duty more than a right for anyone who believes in spiritual, moral, and religious values, and in liberty, to stand up as the adversary of that man and that regime, and to mobilize every resource against both so that humanity may one day recover its civilization intact and its conscience in integrity.

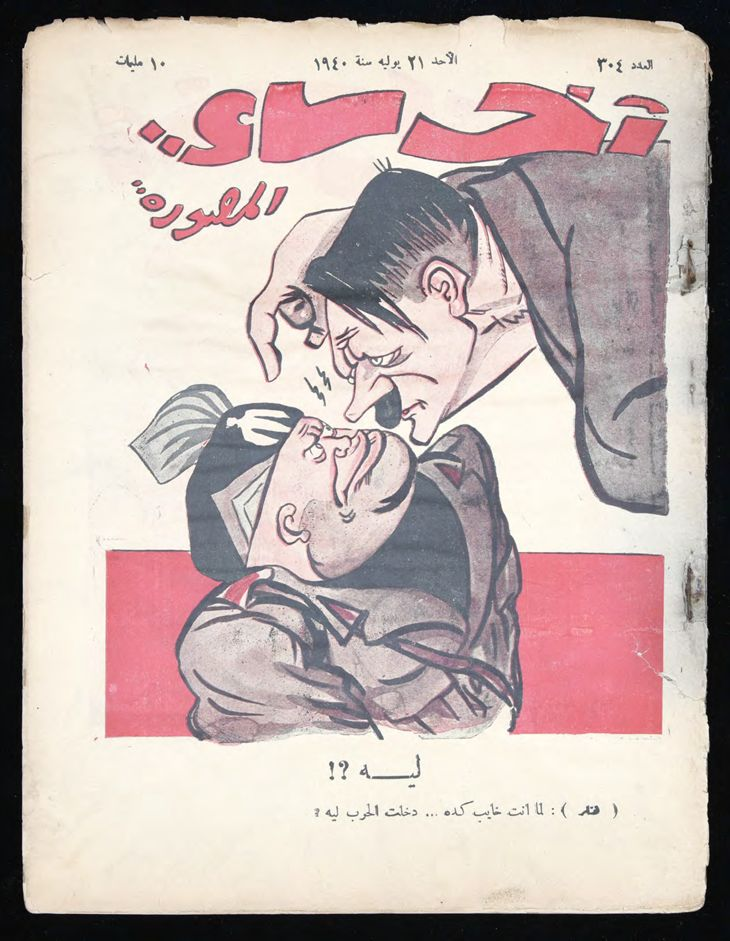
Hitler: Why are you so disappointed? Why did you enter the war? From Ākhir sāʼah. 1940-07-21

The Egyptian legal scholar Abd al-Razzaq al-Sanhuri, while teaching law in Baghdad, argued that Nazism was also anti-Arab as well. al-Sanhuri denounced fascism in an essay he wrote for al-Hilal, concluding that "the democratic system is still the best, most appropriate system that the human race has even known." The Egyptian journalist Salama Moussa, in the magazine Al Majalla Al Jadida, at first supported Germany's industrialization under Hitler, but later denounced it as a totalitarian state, arguing instead for traditional liberal democratic values. Hassan al-Banna, the founder of the Islamist Muslim Brotherhood also criticized fascism, in his book Peace in Islam.

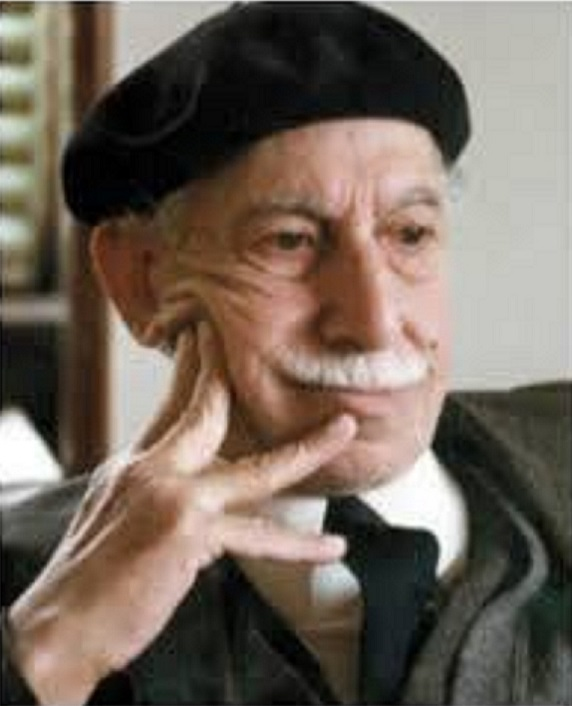
Egyptian writer Tawfiq al-Hakim was an outspoken critic of fascism and the Nazi party.

The Egyptian lawyer Hamid Maliji denounced Hitler's racial theories after Mein Kampf was translated into Arabic. The Egyptian journalist Muhammad Zaki Abd al-Qadir criticized appeasement and argued that the West should abandon appeasement and should instead confront Germany. One of the pioneers of Egyptian literature, Tawfiq al-Hakim directly ridiculed Hitler and Mussolini in his book Himari Qala Li (My Donkey Told Me). Here, Al-Hakim comments on Nazism, Fascism and liberalism through fiction. He writes a fictional conversation between Mussolini and his prison guard, where Mussolini learns that millions of Italians are celebrating his removal. He also writes a conversation between Scheherazade and Hitler. Al-Hakim, through Scheherazade, argues with Hitler in favor of democracy against Nazism.

The Egyptian journalist and poet Abbas Mahmoud al-Aqqad was an outspoken critic of Nazism and a supporter of liberal democracy; he even fled to Sudan in an attempt to avoid being captured by the German army during the invasion of Egypt for publishing his anti-Nazi book "Hitler in the Balance". He argued that Hitler and Nazism were the ultimate danger to freedom and liberalism, and believed democracy was a better model for Egypt than dictatorship. Aqqad believed that "the fulfillment of the needs of these countries can by ensured only by democratic governments"

The author Muhamad Abdallah Inan warned against the Nazi Party, specifically against its racism and repression of the free press. In Ar-Risala, he wrote:

German National Socialism does not stop its view about the racial superiority at this point, but it goes much beyond that. It announces the superiority of the Aryan race over all other races, not only over the Jewish race and considers all non-Aryan races as inferior; and the people of the south Mediterranean and the Semitic and Oriental people all generally belong to the inferior people that should be avoided by the Aryan race, which should be careful not to mix with them [...] there is no need to say that this theory is not based on proper science nor proper research or proper thought, it is only a new form of the attitude of hate of western people towards [others] and a new form of western colonialism.

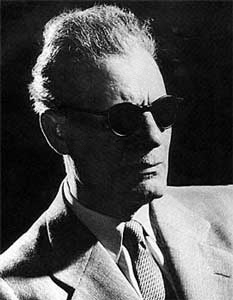
Egyptian philosopher Taha Hussein was an outspoken critic of fascism and the Nazi party.

The most influential political party in Egypt at the time was the Wafd, which emerged from the anti-British protests during the 1919 revolution. The Wafdist Egyptian politician Mostafa al-Nahhas – who was prime minister from 1942 to 1944 – refused to ally himself with the Nazis. According to his memoirs, he first met Hitler in 1936 while on vacation in Berlin. During this meeting, Hitler talked with passion about England and France and the 'injustices' Germany had suffered; when Nahhas tried to leave, Hitler kept the conversation going for half an hour. After the meeting, Nahhas claimed to conclude that "this angry, agitated young man would inevitably drag the entire world into a world war." In Rome 1938, he was approached by the Italian Foreign Minister Galeazzo Ciano, who attempted to convince him to join the Axis, even promising him the presidency of an Egyptian republic. Nahhas refused; later when a journalist for Al-Ahram passed on a message from Mussolini to Nahhas his threat to conquer Egypt, Nahhas instructed him to the tell the Duce that his ambitions are like the ambitions of Satan to enter Paradise, Allah would protect Egypt from "that arrogant man".

In 1939, Al-Husseini wrote to Nahhas, imploring him to support Nazi Germany. Nahhas had a conversation about the letter with other Arab nationalists, including Abd al-Rahman Shahbandar, Muhammad Ali al-Tahir, and Ahmad Hilmi. Shahbandar argued that the letter was a forgery, sent by Goebbels and that if Germany won the war, the situation in Palestine would not be any better; if Al-Husseini joined with Hitler, the loss will be huge. Another Syrian, Haqi al-Baroudi argued that Arabs should arm themselves for the Palestine cause, but that regarding Germany, they are all colonists and want to control and rob Arabs. After the meeting, Nahhas wrote back to al-Husseini, advising that he should be cautious and neutral, and to not trust Nazi propaganda. In 1942, Nahhas promised Rabbi Nahum Effendi that if Egypt were to fall to Germany, Egypt would not enact any anti-Jewish laws.

Shortly before the outbreak of World War II, Nazi propaganda minister Joseph Goebbels visited Egypt in April 1939. Goebbels planned to visit in 1937 but canceled after protests by the Egyptian government; he was allowed a visit in 1939 only after agreeing to be a tourist, not to arrive as an official state visit. Goebbels was disappointed by the lack of reception from the native Egyptians since he was under the impression that the Egyptian were anti-Semites and would be pleased about his visit. Werner Otto von Hentig had to explain to Goebbels

"that there is no antisemitism in Egypt as in all other Islamic countries, but rather [that] the majority of Jews, with the exception of the Zionists, are considered loyal citizens of Egyptian nationality".

Akher Saa reported that "Nobody believes, not even Egyptians, that Dr. Goebbels flew here for a rest", quoting a speech Goebbels gave to a local German school where he announced "how splendid it would be" if German soldiers were occupying Egypt.

The political cartoons which were produced during that time frequently satirized politics in Egypt as well as foreign affairs. Cartoons produced by Alexandar Saroukhan and in Akher Saa, along others, were firmly anti-Nazi and anti-fascist. Both the Italian and German legation in Egypt complained to the Egyptian Ministry of Foreign Affairs about "allegedly absurd caricatures of the Duce and the Führer in certain Egyptian weekly reviews". The political cartoonist Kimon Evan Marengo, code name KEM, produced anti-Nazi cartoons during the war for the British Foreign office.

==== Collaboration ====
Aziz Ali al-Masri was an Egyptian officer who was suspected by the British to be in contact with the Axis early in the war. On May 16, 1941, during the Anglo-Iraqi War, al-Masri attempted to fly to Iraq, but the plane lost power and crashed near Cairo. After he was caught, al-Masri claimed he was actually flying there to stop the rebellion. During an inquiry, it was revealed that, in a meeting with the British Colonel C. M. J. Thornhill on the 12th, he proposed this idea. Whether or not he was telling the truth about his intentions, the fact that Thornhill proposed that Iraq and Egypt should become British dominions in the meeting, which would have angered the Egyptian public if it was revealed and be easy propaganda for the Axis, convinced British authorities to drop the case. Al-Masri was dismissed from his post. His secret clique of anti-British officers as well as prime minister Ali Maher were the precursor to the 1952 Egyptian coup d'état, with many of the same officers involved, including future president of Egypt Anwar Sadat.

Sadat attempted to collaborate with the Axis during the war. His memoirs, Revolt on the Nile (1957) and In Search of Identity (1977), describe how he saw the military as the key to sparking revolution in Egypt, similar to the Urabi revolt. There were meetings and talk among junior officers as early as 1939 about a potential revolt, with Sadat describing how he wanted to make Egypt "a second Iraq". Sadat writes that al-Masri's goal was Beirut, which was under the Vichy government at the time, but since his car broke down on the way, he missed the secret German plane that was intending to transport him. Then he tried to seize an Egyptian plane, but it hit a post on takeoff, grounding it.

After the Abdeen Palace incident, where British troops ordered the Egyptian King Farouk to appoint a pro-Allied prime minister, Sadat furthered his plans for a coup. He met with the Islamist leader of the Muslim Brotherhood Hassan al-Banna, but was disappointed over his lack of explicit support for the plan. Sadat then met with two German agents in Cairo to discuss his plan, but was caught by the British and sentenced to two years in prison.

Egyptian officials were in contact with the Axis during the war. In 1941, the Egyptian Ambassador in Switzerland told the Hungarian Ambassador that every Egyptian nationalist fervently hoped the Axis would win the war – but Egypt did expect full independence when the British were defeated. Though he was assured Egypt would gain its independence, he was disturbed by an article in Relazioni Internazionali published the next day, which announced 'the Egyptian bastion was bound to fall under Italian/German domination, and the fate of Egypt would be carved out in Rome and Berlin for all time". The same year, the Egyptian Ambassador to Iran, Youssef Zulficar Pasha passed a message from King Farouk to the Shah of Iran and the German Minister in Iran. The message alerted to a British plan to occupy the Iranian oilfields, as well as sending a message of "the King's desire for open and loyal relations with Germany". The British government was so afraid of King Farouk defecting to the Axis that when the King flew on his plane to Alexandria, British airplanes escorted him; the pilots had instructions to force his plane to land if it turned west.

=== Iraq ===
The German ambassador to Iraq, Fritz Grobba, led a policy of spreading Nazism in Iraq. A local branch of the Nazi party was formed for the German diaspora in Iraq, while trade between Germany and Iraq from 1935 to 1938 doubled. A kindergarten was opened in Baghdad, and Iraqi students with proficiency in German were eligible for free education in Germany. In 1938, the Iraqi Director General of Education and later Foreign Minister and Prime Minister, Muhammad Fadhel al-Jamali, sent a delegation to the Nuremberg Rally, whose leader was personally introduced to Hitler. In 1937, Iraqi Jewish students complained to the Ministry of Education about teachers who spread German propaganda in the classroom. Dr. Saib Shawkat, leader of the nationalist Al-Muthanna Club, visited Nazi Germany in 1937.

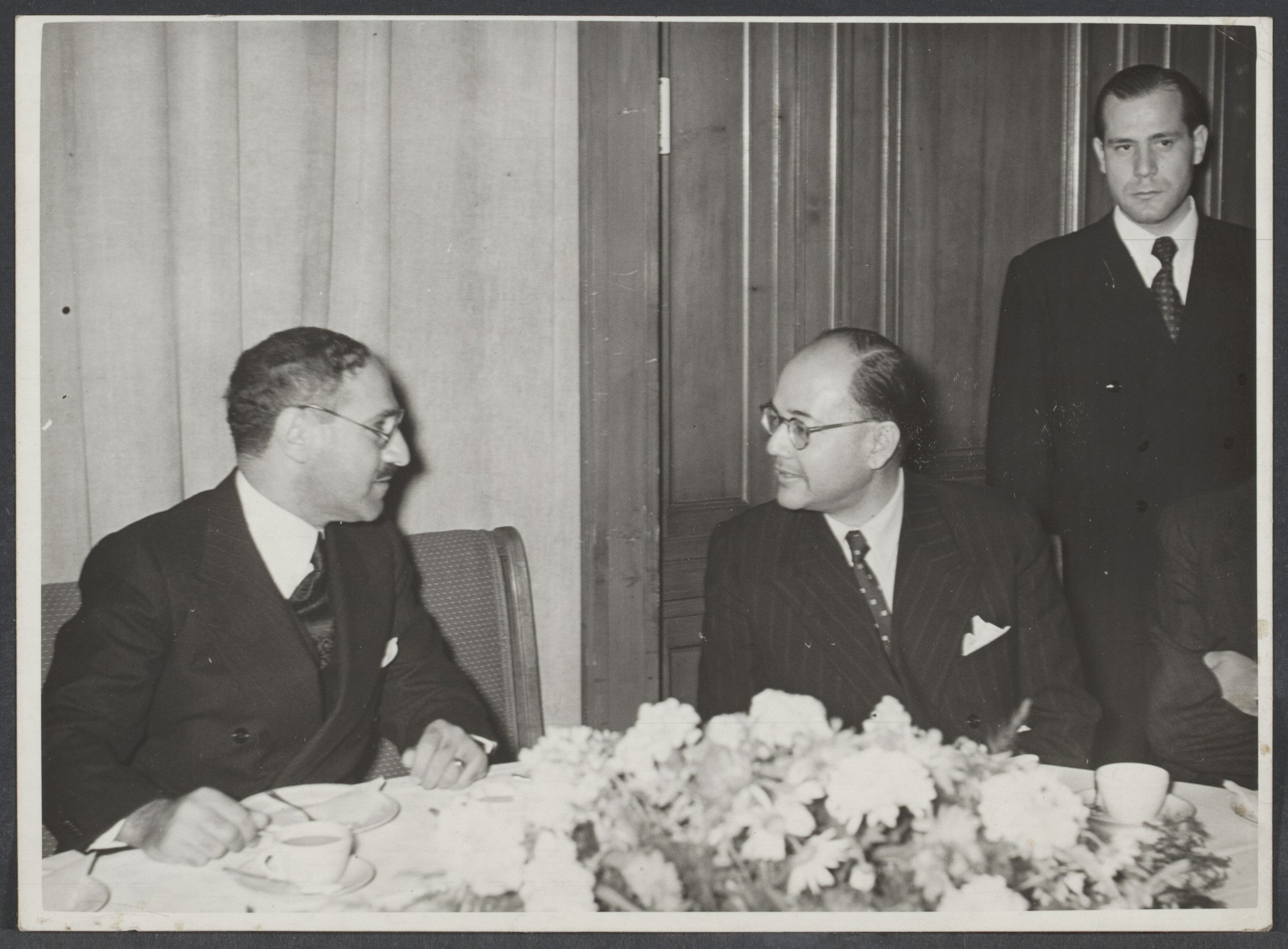
Rashid Ali al-Gaylani and Indian nationalist Subhas Chandra Bose in a meeting in Berlin. 23 September 1942

The historian Edgar Flacker argued that the newspaper al-'Alam al-'Arabi was funded by the German legation in Baghdad, though the historian Peter Wien argues that the paper's pro-authoritarian attitudes were not caused by any outside funding, but by genuine belief. A 1934 article in the paper analyzed the political developments of nations since World War One and argued that Japan was the best country to emulate. In 1936, General Bakr Sidqi led a coup against the Iraqi government, the first in its modern history. An article in al-'Alam al-'Arabi in April of that year defended the idea of dictatorship. The article argued that dictatorship, a nation led by "strength" and "virtue" instead of "words", was needed for Iraq, citing Atatürk's Turkey, Hitler's Germany, and Mussolini's Italy as examples as 'unselfish' rulers making strong decisions based on 'virtue'. In 1935, a letter was published in al-'Alam al-'Arabi – which Wien suspects was written by a German living in Iraq – defending the Nazi racial laws.

On 1 April 1941, the day after General Erwin Rommel launched his Tunisian offensive, the 1941 Iraqi coup d'état, led by a secret alliance of nationalist politicians called the Golden Square, overthrew the pro-British Kingdom of Iraq. While Nazi Germany was not openly allied with the government of Iraq like Fascist Italy was during the Anglo-Iraqi War, it provided air support. On May 30, Younis al-Sabawi, a leader of the al-Muthana club and who had previously translated Mein Kampf into Arabic, summoned the Chief Rabbi of Baghdad Sassoon Kadoori. al-Sabawi ordered Kadoori to instruct the Jewish community to lock themselves in their homes for a few days, stay off the telephones, cook enough food for a three-day journey, pack a single suitcase and prepare for transport to detention centers. Kadoori and several other leading members of the Jewish community secretly met with mayor of Baghdad Arshad al-Umari. al-Umari later paid al-Sabawi around 16,000 dinars to flee the city, preventing him from broadcasting his planned anti-semitic speech on the radio.

By June 1, the leaders of the coup had fled the city, coinciding with the Jewish holiday of Shavuot. From 1–2 June 1941, immediately after the collapse of the pro-Fascist Rashid Ali government in Iraq, al-Husseini and others inspired a pogrom against the Jewish population of Baghdad known as "the Farhud". Iraqi Jews were massacred in the street and in their houses, while the British army refused to enter until the next day. The estimates of Jewish victims vary from less than 110 to over 600 killed, and from 240 to 2,000 wounded. The historian Edwin Black concludes that the exact numbers will never be known, pointing out the improbability of the initial estimate in the official reports of 110 fatalities that included both Arabs and Jews (including 28 women), as opposed to the claims of Jewish sources that as many as 600 Jews were killed. Similarly, the estimates of Jewish homes destroyed range from 99 to over 900 houses. Though these figures are debated in the secondary literature, it is generally agreed that over 580 Jewish businesses were looted. The Iraqi-Arab Futuwwa youth group – modeled after the Hitler Youth – were widely credited with the Farhud. Saib Shawkat, an Iraqi doctor and leader of the al-Muthanna club, was chief of surgery at Baghdad Medical College, and attended to wounded Iraqi Jews in his hospital. When some of his Jewish nurses reported rape threats by wounded Iraqi officers, he threatened to shoot the officers.

In response to the Rashid Ali coup, Hitler issued Führer Directive No. 30 on 23 May 1941, to support their cause. This order began: "The Arab Freedom Movement in the Middle East is our natural ally against England."

On 11 June 1941, Hitler and the supreme commander of the armed forces issued Directive No. 32:

Exploitation of the Arab Freedom Movement. The situation of the English in the Middle East will be rendered more precarious, in the event of major German operations, if more British forces are tied down at the right moment by civil commotion or revolt. All military, political, and propaganda measures to this end must be closely coordinated during the preparatory period. As central agency abroad I nominate Special Staff F, which is to take part in all plans and actions in the Arab area, whose headquarters are to be in the area of the Commander Armed Forces South-east. The most competent available experts and agents will be made available to it. The Chief of the High Command of the Armed Forces will specify the duties of Special Staff F, in agreement with the Foreign Minister where political questions are involved.

On May 4, 1942, members of the Golden Square, Fahmi Said, Mahmud Salman and Yunis al-Sabawi, were sentenced to death and hanged. Kamil Shabib was hanged two years later. Salah al-Din al-Sabbagh fled to Iran and later Turkey, where he was captured and hanged at the entrance of the at the gate of the Ministry of Defense in 1945. Rashid Ali al-Gaylani, the leader of the Square, fled to Iran and then Italy and formed a pro-Nazi government-in-exile, later fleeing to Saudi Arabia, avoiding capture.

==== Opposition to Fascism ====
The newspaper Saut al-Sha'b took a firm anti-German stance. In February 1940, it stated that Nazi Germany was a threat to the small countries of Europe, whose fate could only be secured by Allied victory. It later argued that democracy was a sunnah, that the rule of one man and one people over another was immoral and incompatible with Islam. Saut al-Sha'b produced a series of short commentaries called "Sawanih" ('Thoughts' in Arabic). One article compared Germany and Italy to wolves, attacking the 'lambs' of Europe. In August 1940, an article in Sawanih joked about the difference in character between Germany and England: A German and an Englishman drive and stop in the middle of a one-lane bridge. The German then issues a three-hundred page declaration why the Englishman should retreat. The Englishman responds: "When you have finished reading it, let me know, so that I can read it, too." In frustration, the German drives away.

The satirical newspaper Habazbuz, owned by Nuri Thabit, also criticized fascism, for example, attacking Mussolini when he declared himself the 'protector of Islam'; he supported the Ethiopians during the Italian invasion. Thabit, a teacher himself, complained that students in the Iraqi nationalist clubs didn't know any history: one student said Egypt was founded by Adam and was ruled by Abraham for a thousand years before he was succeeded by Khedive Ismail, another said Harun al-Rashid was one of the four rightly guided caliphs. Thabit complained: "Every day a sports competition! Every day a sporting exercise! Every day a parade!" ... "when you ask a student on Khalid ibn al-Walid, he tells you he is Napoleon's cousin!".

During the Spanish Civil War, around 700 Arabs volunteered for the Republicans, including the Iraqis Nuri Roufeal Kotani and his compatriot Setty Abraham Horresh, who traveled from Syria to Lebanon to France, finally crossing the Pyrenees to fight fascism. Kotani was promoted to corporal and later sergeant for his service in Spain.

Hibatuddin Shahrestani was a Shi'a religious leader and anti-colonial activist in Iraq. In 1910, he argued that the answer to colonialism was Islamic unity, one that went beyond ethnic exclusivity. In 1937, he argued that Islam was a religion based on the universal brotherhood of all men, that celebrated the dignity of the individual. Thus, Nazism was incompatible with Islamic beliefs. He was not the only Islamic leader to reject the ultra-nationalist currents of the time; when Hajj Amin al-Husayni visited Mosul, he was told by the chief judge, Ra'uf al-Mufti, that the people of Mosul had no intention of attacking Jews, because Islam commands Muslims to defend their neighbors.

The Iraqi Communist Party (ICP) initially supported the 1941 Iraqi coup, due to its genuine popularity among the anti-British Iraqi masses. Communist leader Yusuf Salman Yusuf sent a letter to the coup leader Rashid Gaylani, imploring him to stay away from the Axis powers – which the ICP considered imperialist – and antisemitism, instead suggesting an alliance with the Soviet Union. Fahd later denounced the al-Gaylani as fascist and criminal, regretting his previous support. The Iraqi Communist Party then voiced its supported for Britain and the government of Nuri al-Said in the war against Nazism.

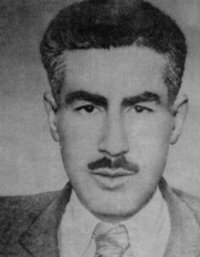
Yusuf Salman Yusuf – also known as "Comrade Fahd" – leader of the Iraqi Communist Party in 1941

During the Farhud, a massacre of Iraqi Jews in Baghdad, the mufti of Mosul, Sheikh Ibrahim al-Rumi, promised Rabbi Yaakov Mutzafi that the police commander had guaranteed their safety. On June 1, officers were guarding the streets in the city; they remained at these posts throughout the following day. In Sulaimaniya, the imam of the city, upon hearing that young men were planning to attack the Jewish population, denounced them as criminals who rejected Islam, highlighting that Jews were under their protection. In Hilla, the governor of Hashimiyya had weapons distributed to the Futuwwa youth movement and instructed them to attack local Jews. In response, the local mujtahid, Mirza al-Qazwini threatened to attack Al Hashimiyah with his tribesmen. While large-scale violence was averted, three Jews were attacked while boarding a train and one died later died in the hospital. Following this incident al-Qazwini confronted the governor, arguing that the murder was a sacrilege.

While most of the violence was in Baghdad, the city of Basra saw looting of Jewish homes as well. The historian Orit Bashkin argues that Basra did not experience an event at the same scale as Baghdad, because the nationalist forces were not as powerful as local Islamic traditions. The mayor, Sheikh Ahmad Bash-A'yan, formed a local militia to restore order to the city. Later, while in Palestine for medical reasons, the president of the Jewish community of Basra sent a letter to the Jewish Agency, asking that the sheikh should be recognized for his efforts to save Iraqi Jews. Other Basran locals participated in the defense; Sayyid Muhammad Salih al-Radini, with a group of armed men, threatened two individuals who tried to break into the home of the Jewish Sofer family. The two individuals were later assaulted as a "cautionary" measure.

=== Lebanon ===
Raif Khoury was an early 20th century Lebanese political activist who wrote in Al Tariq, a Lebanese political magazine which served as an outlet of the League Against Nazism and Fascism. The League organized anti-fascist conferences in Lebanon, with Khoury often giving speeches at these events. Khoury alerted the Lebanese public through pamphlets and articles, such as in one article saying:

The reader must know that human rights, even in their bourgeois democratic version, are threatened with extinction. How great then must be the threat [posed by Fascism] to the Socialist version of human rights [in the USSR]?! The reader must realize that we are at a turning point of history. This forces us to fight two jihads for human rights: a jihad to preserve the rights guaranteed by bourgeois democracy; and another jihad for an extension of these rights to its Socialist version. Each of these jihads is complementary to the other.

Khoury often used both Islamic religious and socialist secular imagery in his writings, commenting on both the French Revolution and contemporary movements in his writings. He was not alone, papers like al-Hadith, al-Dabbur, Lisan al-Hal and Al-'Irfan firmly stood with the Allies. Salim Khayyata, a member of the Syrian–Lebanese Communist Party, wrote scathing reports on the rise of fascism in Europe and specifically the Italian invasion of Ethiopia.

==== Shakib Arslan ====
Shakib Arslan was an Arab writer, poet, historian, politician, and Emir in Lebanon. His critique of colonialism and defense of Islam made him one of the most influential early 20th century Arab intellectuals. His relations with Germany preceded the Nazis; he had stood by Kaiser Willhelm II during a speech he gave in Damascus where he called Germany 'the protector of 300 million Muslims' in 1898. During the interwar period, he tried to convince German leaders to revive the spirit of the German-Ottoman cooperation during World War One through his colleague Max von Oppenheim. He believed, since Germany and the Arab world shared the same enemies, Britain and France, an alliance between the two was the best hope for independence. In a visit to Berlin in 1934, his request for Nazi assistance for the Arab world was denied by the diplomat Curt Prüfer. He even visited Berlin only three weeks after the invasion of Poland. Arslan wrote to al-Husseini that "I follow the Axis in the hope that by means of their victory, Islam will be liberated from its slavery". He was also unique in being an apologist for Mussolini and his invasion of Ethiopia, even meeting him multiples times, causing him to be criticized by other Arabs. Arslan was approached to translate Mein Kampf in Arabic and wrote articles in Arabic Nazi propaganda.

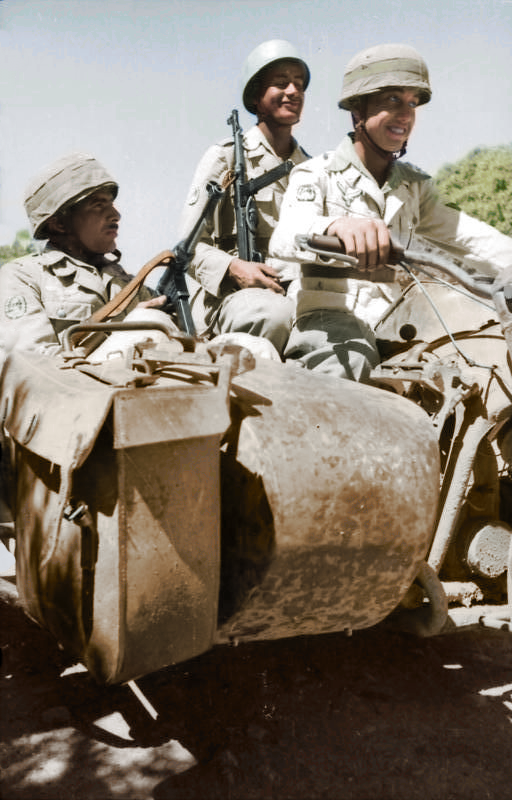
Free Arabian Legion soldiers riding a BMW R75 motorcycle, Balkan Peninsula, 1943.

However, he personally did not agree with Nazism. In 1939, he wrote to Daniel Guérin that, while Germany was the enemy of their enemies, he was not ignorant; if German control over the Arab world became unbearable, "they would have only changed masters". In a letter to Muhammad Ali el-Taher, he wrote that Germany 'holds principles I do not share', and in a letter Nuri al-Sa'id he stated that Germany was like any other European country, writing "I do not care for Hitler, nor do I defend him or believe his ideology". In his diary, he wrote that if Italy took over Palestine, it would not liberate the Palestinians, but instead turn it into an Italian colony. In his diary, Arslan also condemned the German occupation of Czechoslovakia, lamenting that "the oppressed became the oppressor". While acknowledging his earlier sympathy for Germany's post-World War I plight, Arslan wrote that any person of conscience had to disapprove of Hitler's expansionist policies and warned that Axis aggression would ultimately harm both Europe and the Arab world.

Arslan's objections to Germany and Italy, however, were made strictly in private. Publicly, he endorsed the Axis powers to advance Arab independence, writing in La Nation Arabe that "the enemy of my enemy is my friend, this is the harsh truth."

=== Morocco ===
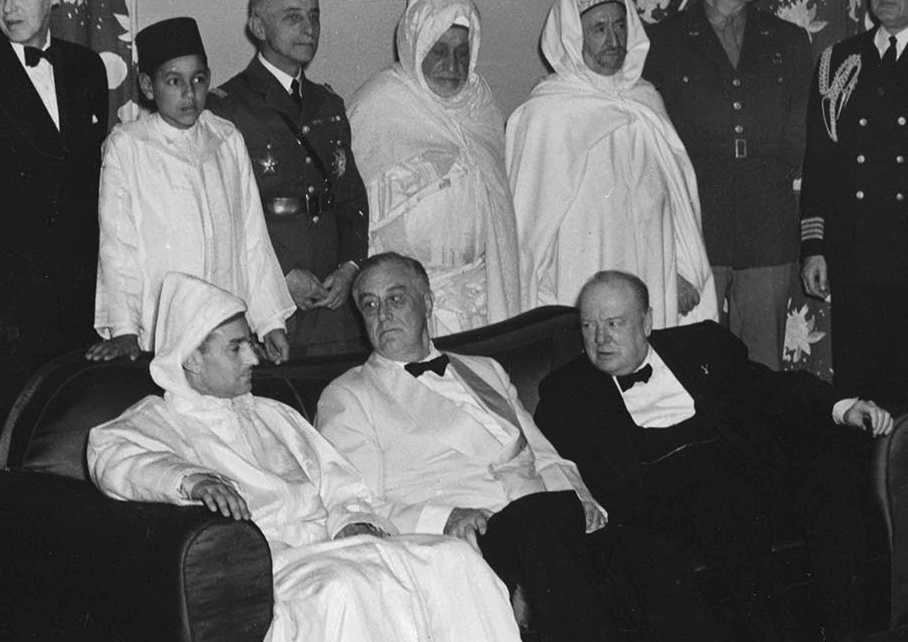
Sultan of Morocco Muhammad V with FDR and Churchill at the 1943 Casablanca Conference

Sultan Mohammed V reportedly refused to sign off on "Vichy's plan to ghettoize and deport Morocco's quarter of a million Jews to the killing factories of Europe," and, in an act of defiance, insisted on inviting all the rabbis of Morocco to the 1941 throne celebrations. During the celebrations, loud enough for the French attendees to hear him, he said: "I must inform you that, just as in the past, the Israelites will remain under my protection...I refuse to make any distinction between my subjects." For example, King Mohammed V refused to make the 200,000 Jews who were living in Morocco wear yellow stars, even though this discriminatory practice was enforced in France. He is reported to have said: "There are no Jews in Morocco. There are only subjects." However, the French government did impose some antisemitic laws against the sultan's will.

During the Battle of France, more than 2,100 Moroccan troops were killed and 18,000 were taken prisoner. The Armée d'Afrique later fought in the 1943 Tunisian campaign.

In August 1933, Muhammed al-Kholti, a Moroccan nationalist, wrote "The Jews and Us" in the magazine L'Action du Peuple, calling for an entente between Jews and Muslims. In the magazine L'Avenir Illustré, he wrote:

Do not be mistaken, fellow Jews, Morocco is for Moroccans, that is for us Muslims and for you Jews. It is our duty to collaborate together to defend our homeland. Say it once and for all that you have one homeland [not the Promised Land, but the land where you are now].

==== Taqi-ud-Din al-Hilali ====
Muhammad Taqi-ud-Din al-Hilali was a 20th-century Moroccan Salafi Islamic scholar, most famous for English translations of the Quran, known as The Noble Quran, and Sahih al-Bukhari. al-Hilali moved from Iraq to Nazi Germany in 1936 to study Arabic philology, first at the University of Bonn – under the recommendation of the aforementioned Arslan – and then at the University of Berlin. At Bonn, he studied under Orientalist Paul Kahle, who later fled Germany with his wife due to their outspoken opposition to Nazism. During his time in Germany, he became interested in radios, believing that the Muslim world needed to invest in more stations to broadcasts religious teachings. In 1939, he became a speaker for the Arabic propaganda section of Radio Berlin, then led by Yunis Bahri. While Bahri relied on nationalism – greeting every broadcast with "Here is Berlin, greetings to the Arabs" – for his propaganda, al-Hilali relied on Islamic pride, highlighting French colonialism's suppression of traditional Islam in Morocco. He left Germany in 1942 for Tetouan, Morocco.

=== Tunisia ===
Tunisia, like Morocco, was a de facto colony, ruled by Ahmed Pasha Bey and Moncef Bey. The Nazis established labor camps in Tunisia, killing over 2,500 Tunisian Jews, including the famous Tunisian Jewish boxer Messaoud Hai Victor Perez, who was sent to Auschwitz and shot during a death march by a German officer. Though Ahmed Pasha did sign anti-Jewish legislation, forced by the French Resident-General of Tunisia, Jean-Pierre Esteva, he deliberately stalled implementation of these policies. Moncef Bey went even farther; just eight days after ascending the throne, he awarded the highest royal distinction to about twenty prominent Tunisian Jews. Moncef later went on to say that Tunisian Jews are "his children" like Tunisian Muslims. His prime minister, Mohamed Chenik, regularly warned Jewish leaders of German plans. He helped Jews avoid arrest, intervened to prevent deportations, and even hid individual Jews. Khaled Abdul-Wahab saved several Jewish lives during the Holocaust, and was the first Arab to be nominated for the Righteous Among the Nations. So did Si Ali Sakkat, a local land owner, took in sixty Jews who escaped from a nearby labor camp. According to Mathilda Guez, a Tunisian Jew who later became an Israeli politician, Moncef Bey gathered all the senior officials of the realm at the palace and gave them this warning:

The Jews are having a hard time but they are under our patronage and we are responsible for their lives. If I find out that an Arab informer caused even one hair of a Jew to fall, this Arab will pay with his life.

Moncef Bey was later ousted from power, with the French claiming that he was a Nazi collaborator. General Alphonse Juin doubted this charge and tried to prevent his ouster. The real reason he was removed was because he formed the first solely Tunisian government, causing an outcry by French settlers.

==== Habib Bourguiba ====
Habib Bourguiba was a Tunisian nationalist and president of Tunisia from 1957 to 1987. When World War II began, he was residing a French prison in Marseilles alongside his nationalist compatriots, such as Mongi Slim. On November 26, the Italian government requested Germany to release the imprisoned Tunisian leaders. After the prisoners were freed, they were met with Italian representatives, eager to exploit them for Italian control of Tunisia. Bourguiba and his colleagues were transferred to luxurious estates for the meetings. Bourguiba's demands of a government led by Moncef Bey and a nationalist government were rejected, however. He then refused to work for the Axis unless his political conditions were met, and he asked to be returned to Tunisia. Bourguiba was unimpressed by Axis, and wrote a secret letter around this time:

Our support of the Allies must be without condition. Because for us it is essential that at the end of the war – which now should happen before long – we would find ourselves in the camp of the winners, having contributed, however little, to the common victory.

In an interview after the war, one of Bourguiba's fellow prisoners, Dr. Slimane Ben Slimane, stated:

The truth is that we were all so pro-Nazi that we had hoped for the victory of the Axis. We were mistaken but that is how it was. It has to be said that the first to be doubtful of such a victorious outcome was Bourguiba. As best I remember, one evening in December 1940 we were following on the radio developments in the battle of England when Bourguiba declared: The battle of England is lost, therefore the Germans will lose the war, it's only a question of time, remember Napoleon. We protested without persuading him.

On February 26, 1943, an Italian plane returned the men to Tunis in a plot to lessen hostilities from the local population, due to the harsh conditions of Arab workers. The German government tried to incite anti-Jewish sentiment in the country. In October 1942, Bourguiba had sent his wife and son back to Tunis with a personal message to the American consulate that the Tunisians could expect nothing from the Germans and he was telling his followers to support the United Nations. Immediately after arriving in Tunisia, he tried to stop any pro-Axis sentiment among the nationalists, understanding that this jeopardized their position post-war. Bourguiba's position during his imprisonment was vague, while he privately denounced the Axis, he willingly presented himself as a useful pawn for Nazi ambitions in the region and was in contact with Amin al-Husseini. He later fled Tunisia after learning that the French government was planning on arresting his for collusion.

=== Palestine ===
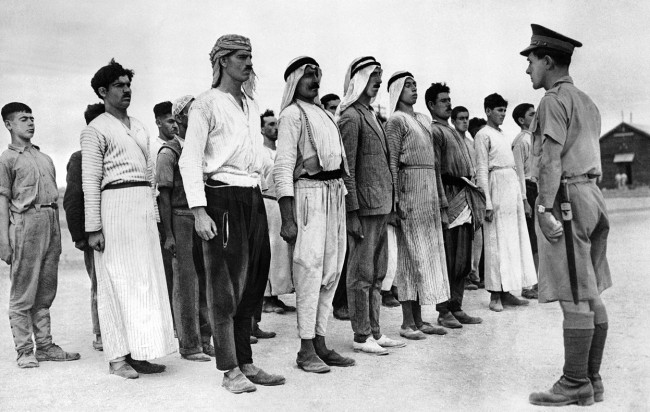
Palestinian Arab recruits training in the British army.

Many Palestinian commentators denounced Hitler and Nazism. In 1936, the Arab newspaper al-Difa' published an article which contained the following statement: "There will be no peace in Europe until the spirit of the Swastika, ruling Germany today, will be overcome." Newspapers such as Filastin extensively covered Germany's new armament policy. In 1934, the newspaper warned, "Europe will see no peace if it will not keep distance from the spirit of the swastika that dominates Germany today. ... [Nazism] is an ideology full of disrespect of all peoples; it glorifies the German, and therein lies a danger." In 1933, Filastin would later go on to print that "The Jews are oppressed only because they are Jews, no more, and there is no justification for that." An article in Filastin titled "The Truth about the Hitler Movement: Reasons for the Persecution of the Jews": denounced Nazi racial ideology, saying:

Hitler followers want to make their race the ruler of all races in the world. One would think, the Nazis are Christians, and is not Christianity a fruit of the Semites and not of the Aryan people? Therefore, the view of Hitler's supporters is very strange.

Editor Yusuf Hanna predicted the "biggest confrontation in history" and he dismissed the idea of a Nazi "preventive war" against Communism: "Nazism does not fight communism, but wants to enslave all peoples." In the summer of 1941, Filastin predicted that Germany could never win a multifront war: "There is no doubt that we will soon witness the time of punishment for Nazi Germany, according to all the bestialities it has committed."

The leftist paper Al-Ghad warned that Palestine was directly threatened by the prospect of an Axis victory: "If Fascism will prevail, and the Arab lands will be enslaved with iron and fire, our struggle for independence will be set back for years." On the outbreak of the war, Al-Ghad argued that Arabs should support Britain over Nazi Germany:

The Arab people ... stand at the side of those who fight Fascism. The differences between England and the Palestinian Arabs ... do not change this. Those are local struggles, which have to be delayed until the end of the tensions in the world. ... We are not stupid [enough] to believe the sentence "the enemy of my enemy is my friend."

Muhammad Najati Sidqi was a Palestinian intellectual and a leftist activist. In 1940, he wrote "The Islamic Traditions and the Nazi Principles: Can They Agree?", in which he argued that Nazism is entirely contrary to Islamic beliefs. Sidqi had previously fought for the Republicans in the Spanish Civil War. He believed that Muslims must pause the fight against Britain and support the war against Germany, which he believed was the greater enemy. He wrote that the racist beliefs of the Germans were in complete disagreement with Islam, citing both Nazi and Islamic sources: "The barbaric theory of Nazi racism fundamentally contradicts the teachings of Islam, since Islam sees in all of its followers one equal essence, as it proclaims that all the believers are brothers.'" Since racial equality is integral to Islam, Nazism "represents the lowest level of concrete greed," going on to describe it as 'chaotic paganism'. He ended the book arguing that Arabs should mobilize for the Allies.

Sidqi was not the only Palestinian Arab who supported the Republicans. Nagib Yussof was a member of the Association to Aid the Victims of Fascism and Antisemitism (ANTIFA). He was highly critical of the Moroccan troops who fought for Franco, who he described as an enemy of the Arab nation. Mustafa Sa'adi, a member of the Palestine Communist Party, went to Spain as a journalist. Ali Abdel Halik, another Arab communist, left for Spain immediately after being freed from prison and later died from his wounds in a hospital in Albacete; he was treated by Hana Srulovici, a Jewish volunteer nurse from Palestine.

Thousands of Palestinians opposed Amin al-Husseini and Nazi Germany, leading to over 12,000 Palestinian Arab volunteers to serve in the British army. The Palestine Regiment was composed of both Arabs and Jews, which eventually led to the formation of the Jewish Brigade consisting of Yishuv Jews. Platoon 401 fought the Germans in the Battle of France and was the last British platoon to be evacuated from France.

The local Sharq al-Adna station was run by the British to counteract the Axis programming. Journalist Ajjaj al-Nuwayhid led the Arab department, insisting on editorial independence. His broadcasts included anti-fascist content and lectures by Arab intellectuals, such as Ibrahim 'Abd al-Qadir al-Mazani and 'Azmi al-Nashashibi, who openly criticized German and Italian policies and supported collaboration with Great Britain.

Freya Stark, a British official involved in supporting the Arab anti-fascist station, remarked on how independent it operated:

This was an achievement for the war, meant to counteract the Axis, which at that time was giving the Arab world twenty-two daily transmissions in its own language. But what most interested me was the fact that Squadron Leader De Marsac had avoided turning it into a British or Allied station; it was done by the Arabs for the Arabs.

'Azmi al-Nashashibi dismissed the German supported for the 1941 Iraqi revolt as merely a ploy to fight to British, not with any real interest to support the Arabs. Nashashibi argued that they were two types of nations, those that submitted to the Germans like "a slave bought on the slave market", or those who bravely resisted, asking "To which group [do] the Arabs want to belong?".

"The Germans] have descended to a low level of stupidity and idiocy. We expect from the Germans that they would treat us well. But while we respect them as a valuable nation, they mistreat the European people. ... We know that from a German perspective the Arabs belong to the inferior races, who have no right to enjoy life."

==== Amin al-Husseini ====
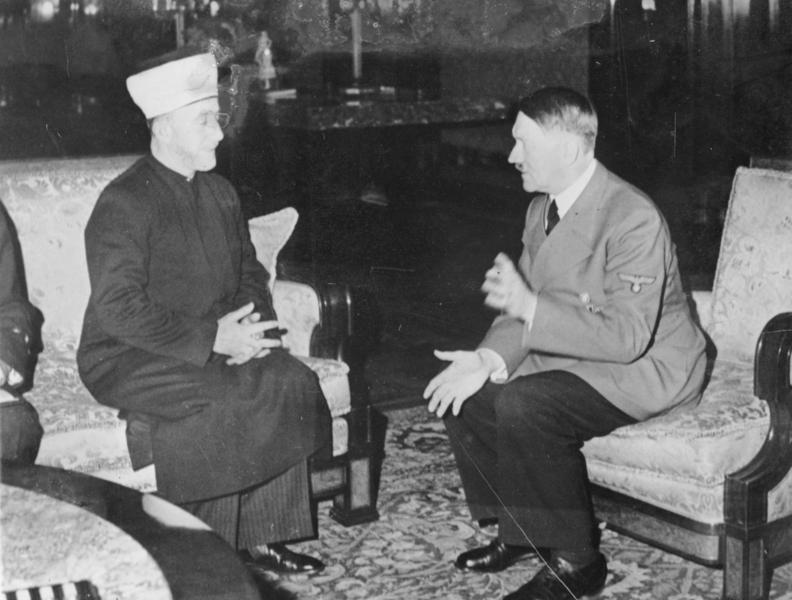
Amin al-Husseini, former Mufti of Jerusalem, was a Nazi collaborator. Here he is photographed meeting with Adolf Hitler in Berlin, 1941.

The most significant practical effect of Nazi anti-Jewish policy between 1933 and 1942 was to radically increase the immigration rate of German and other European Jews to Palestine and to double the population of Palestinian Jews. Al-Husseini had sent messages to Berlin through Heinrich Wolff, the German consul general in Jerusalem, endorsing the advent of the Nazi regime as early as March 1933, and was enthusiastic over the Nazi anti-Jewish policy, and particularly the anti-Jewish boycott in Nazi Germany. "[The Mufti and other sheikhs asked] only that German Jews not be sent to Palestine."

Until the end of 1937, the Nazi policy for solving the "Jewish Question" emphasized motivating German Jews to emigrate from German territory. During this period, the League of Nations Mandate for the establishment of a Jewish homeland in Mandatory Palestine which was supposed to be used as a place of refuge for Jews was "still internationally recognized". The Gestapo and the SS inconsistently cooperated with a variety of Jewish organizations and efforts (e.g., Hanotaiah Ltd., the Anglo-Palestine Bank, the Temple Society Bank, HIAS, Joint Distribution Committee, Revisionist Zionists, and others), most notably in the Haavara Agreement, to facilitate emigration to Mandatory Palestine.

Nora Levin wrote in 1968: "Up to the middle of 1938, Palestine had received one third of all the Jews who had emigrated from Germany since 1933 – 50,000 out of a total of 150,000." Edwin Black, benefitting from more modern scholarship, has written that 60,000 German Jews immigrated into Palestine between 1933 through 1936, bringing with them $100,000,000 ($1.6 billion in 2009 dollars). This precipitous increase in the Jewish Palestinian population stimulated Palestinian Arab political resistance to continued Jewish immigration, and was a principal cause for the 1936–1939 Arab revolt in Palestine, which in turn led to the British White Paper decision to abandon the League of Nations Mandate to establish a Jewish national home in Palestine. The resultant change in British policy effectively closed Palestine to most European Jews who were fleeing Nazi persecution during World War II. After 1938 the majority of Zionist organizations adhered to a strategy of "Fighting the White Paper as if there was not War, and fighting the War as if there was no White Paper". Zionists would smuggle Jews in Palestine whenever possible, regardless if this brought them into conflict with the British authorities. At the same time, the Zionists and other Jews would ally themselves to the British struggle against Germany and the Axis powers, even while the British authorities refused to allow the migration of European Jews into Palestine.

One consequence of al-Husseini's opposition to Britain's mandate in Palestine and his rejection of the British attempts to work out a compromise between Zionists and Palestinian Arabs was that the Mufti was exiled from Palestine. Many of his followers, who had fought in guerrilla campaigns against Jews and the British in Palestine, followed him and continued to work for his political goals. Among the most notable Palestinian soldiers in this category was Abd al-Qadir al-Husayni, a kinsman and officer of al-Husseini who had been wounded twice in the early stages of the 1936–1939 Arab revolt in Palestine. Al-Husseini sent Abd al-Qadir al-Husayni to Germany in 1938 for explosives training. Abd al-Qadir al-Husayni then worked with al-Husseini to support the Golden Square regime, and consequently was tried and sent to prison by the British after they recaptured Iraq. He subsequently became the popular leader of approximately 50,000 Palestinian Arabs who joined the Mufti's Army of the Holy War during the 1947–1948 Arab–Israeli War. His fellow Iraq-veteran and German collaborator Fawzi al-Qawuqji became a rival general in that same struggle against Zionism.

After the Kristallnacht pogroms in November 1938, most Jewish and Zionist organizations aligned with Britain and its allies in opposition to Nazi Germany. After this time, the organized assistance which the Gestapo provided to the Jewish organizations which transported European Jews to Palestine became much more sporadic, but bribery of individual Germans frequently enabled the Jewish organizations to accomplish such operations, even after Nazi Germany's official policy discouraged them.

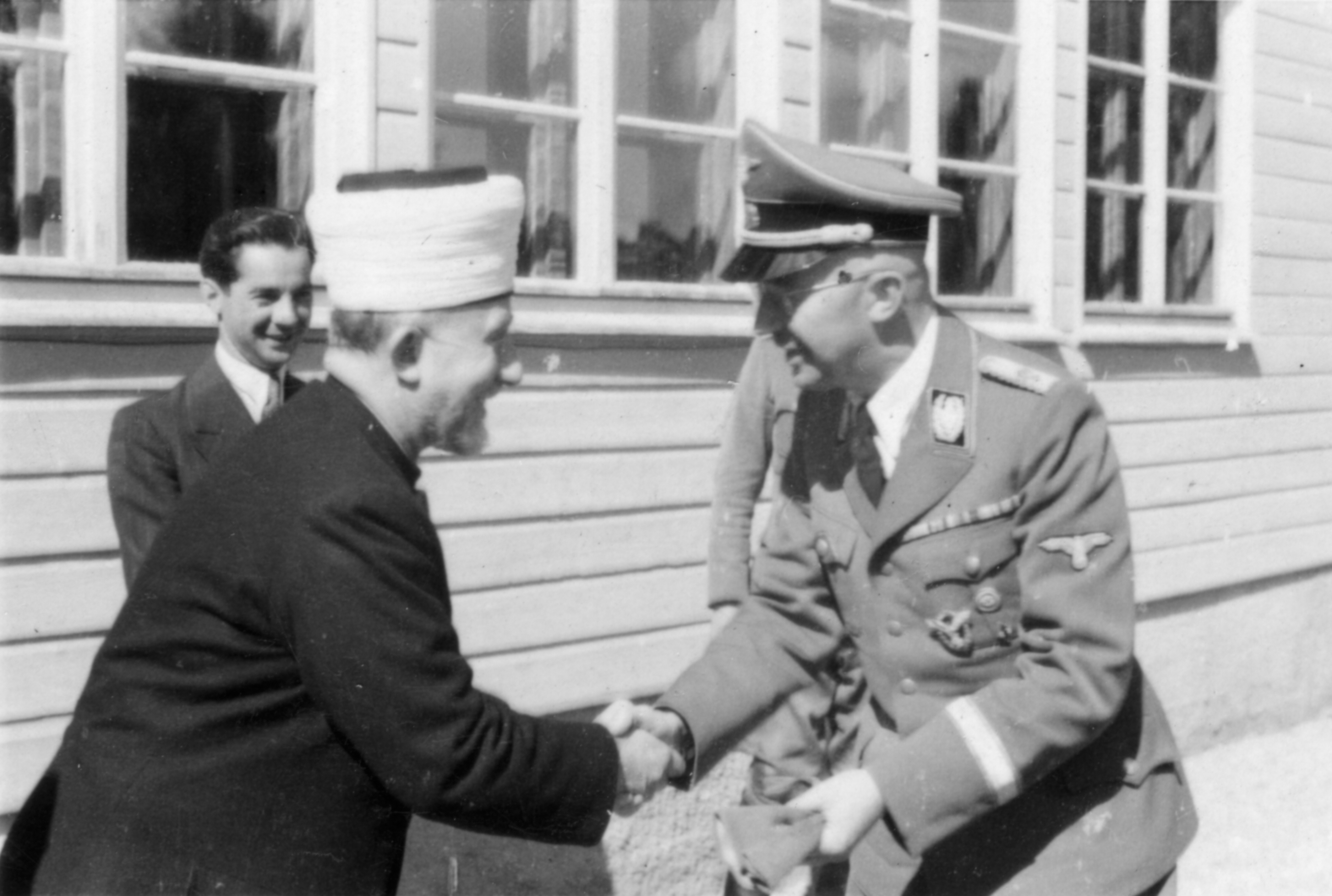
Amin al-Husseini meeting with Heinrich Himmler (1943)

Al-Husseini opposed all immigration of Jews into Palestine. His numerous letters which appealed to various governmental authorities to prevent Jewish emigration to Palestine have been widely republished and they have also been cited as documentary evidence of his collaboration with the Nazis and his participative support of their actions. For instance, in June 1943, al-Husseini recommended to the Hungarian minister that it would be better to send the Jewish population of Hungary to the Nazi concentration camps in Poland rather than let them find asylum in Palestine (it is not entirely clear whether al-Husseini was aware of the extermination camps in Poland, e.g. Auschwitz, at this time):

I ask your Excellency to permit me to draw your attention to the necessity of preventing the Jews from leaving your country for Palestine, and if there are reasons which make their removal necessary, it would be indispensable and infinitely preferable to send them to other countries where they would find themselves under active control, for example, in Poland...

Achcar quotes al-Husseini's memoirs about these efforts to influence the Axis powers to prevent emigration of Eastern European Jews to Palestine:

We combatted this enterprise by writing to Ribbentrop, Himmler, and Hitler, and, thereafter, the governments of Italy, Hungary, Rumania, Bulgaria, Turkey, and other countries. We succeeded in foiling this initiative, a circumstance that led the Jews to make terrible accusations against me, in which they held me accountable for the liquidation of four hundred thousand Jews who were unable to emigrate to Palestine in this period. They added that I should be tried as a war criminal in Nuremberg.

Achcar then notes that although al-Husseini's motivation to block Jewish emigration into Palestine:

was certainly legitimate when it was addressed as an appeal to the British mandatory authorities... It had no legitimacy whatsoever when addressed to Nazi authorities who had cooperated with the Zionists to send tens of thousands of German Jews to Palestine and then set out to exterminate the Jews of Europe. The Mufti was well aware that the European Jews were being wiped out; he never claimed the contrary. Nor, unlike some of his present-day admirers, did he play the ignoble, perverse, and stupid game of Holocaust denial... His amour-propre would not allow him to justify himself to the Jews... gloating that the Jews had paid a much higher price than the Germans... he cites: "Their losses in the Second World War represent more than thirty percent of the total number of their people... Statements like this, from a man who was well placed to know what the Nazis had done... constitute a powerful argument against Holocaust deniers. Husseini reports that Reichsführer-SS Heinrich Himmler... told him in summer 1943 that the Germans had 'already exterminated more than three million' Jews: "I was astonished by this figure, as I had known nothing about the matter until then."... Thus. in 1943, Husseini knew about the genocide... Himmler... again in the summer of 1941... let him in on a secret that... Germany would have an atomic bomb in three years' time...

In November 1943, when he became aware of the nature of the Nazi Final Solution, al-Husseini said:

It is the duty of Muhammadans in general and Arabs in particular to drive all Jews from Arab and Muhammadan countries ... Germany is also struggling against the common foe who oppressed Arabs and Muhammadans in their different countries. It has very clearly recognized the Jews for what they are and resolved to find a definitive solution [endgültige Lösung] for the Jewish danger that will eliminate the scourge that Jews represent in the world.

In 1944, the Germans planned a secret Nazi mission to Palestine. Dubbed "Mission Atlas", the mission was prepared in coordination with al-Husseini. The unit was to incite against the British and organize a new Arab rebellion. The mission was carried out on October 5, 1944. The five agents were flown out of Greece, and at midnight they parachuted into Palestine. The mission failed. One of the few contacts in Palestine the mufti had given the agents, Nafith al-Hussaini, told them to leave immediately. Within ten days, all five agents were arrested by the Palestinian police or members of the Arab Legion.

=== Arab exiles in Nazi Germany and Fascist Italy ===
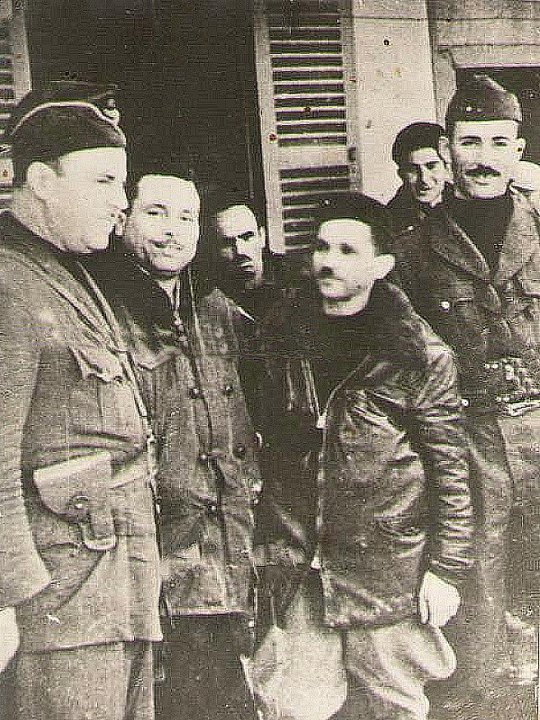
The Algerian Saïd Mohammedi (on the left) joined the German army in 1940 and fought on the Eastern Front during World War II

Following the defeat of the Golden Square in Iraq in May–June 1941, Rashid Ali al-Gaylani fled to Iran but was not to stay long. On 25 August 1941, Anglo-Soviet forces invaded Iran, removing Reza Shah from power. Gaylani then fled to German-occupied Europe. In Berlin, he was received by Adolf Hitler, and he was recognized as the leader of the Iraqi government in exile. Upon the defeat of Germany, Gaylani again fled and found refuge, this time in Saudi Arabia.

Husseini arrived in Rome on 10 October 1941. He outlined his proposals before Alberto Ponce de Leon. On condition that the Axis powers "recognize in principle the unity, independence, and sovereignty, of an Arab state, including Iraq, Syria, Palestine, and Transjordan", he offered support in the war against Britain and stated his willingness to discuss the issues of "the Holy Places, Lebanon, the Suez Canal, and Aqaba". The Italian foreign ministry approved al-Husseini's proposal, recommended giving him a grant of one million lire, and referred him to Benito Mussolini, who met al-Husseini on 27 October. According to al-Husseini's account, it was an amicable meeting in which Mussolini expressed his hostility to the Jews and Zionism.

Back in the summer of 1940 and again in February 1941, al-Husseini submitted to the Nazi German Government a draft declaration of German-Arab cooperation, containing a clause:

Germany and Italy recognize the right of the Arab countries to solve the question of the Jewish elements, which exist in Palestine and in the other Arab countries, as required by the national and ethnic (völkisch) interests of the Arabs, and as the Jewish question was solved in Germany and Italy.

Al-Husseini helped organize Arab students and North African emigres in Germany into the Free Arabian Legion in the German Army that hunted down Allied parachutists in the Balkans and fought on the Russian front. The total number of Arab volunteers in Wehrmacht was "approaching 3,000" when an American offensive in Tunisia captured virtually all the soldiers in 1943, with the remaining 100 who escaped captured in Zagreb in 1945.

== Arab incorporation and emulation of Nazism ==
Several emerging movements in the Arab world were said to have been influenced by European fascist and Nazi organizations during the 1930s. The fascist pan-Arabist Al-Muthanna Club and its al-Futuwwa (Hitler Youth type) movement participated in the 1941 Farhud attack on Baghdad's Jewish community.

Ahmad Shuqayri, the founder of the PLO, wrote in 1946, "Let it be known that we are not anti-British, anti-Soviet, anti-American or antisemitic. Equally, we are not pro-Nazis, pro-Fascists. We are what we are – Arabs and nothing but Arabs. So help us God." The Palestinian newspaper Falastin would later deny the claim that Palestinian nationalism is derived from Fascism:

The Arab Palestinians don't need Fascists or Nazis to be motivated against the Zionists. The hatred against the Zionist plan in Palestine grew long before Nazism and Fascism. ... But always, when Arabs protest the pro-Zionist policies of England, we heard: Arab Palestinians learned it from the Nazis. And the English believe this? Reality is different. The Arabs don't expel the Jews from the home, but those foreigners want to push the Arabs out of the country.

=== Ba'athist Party ===
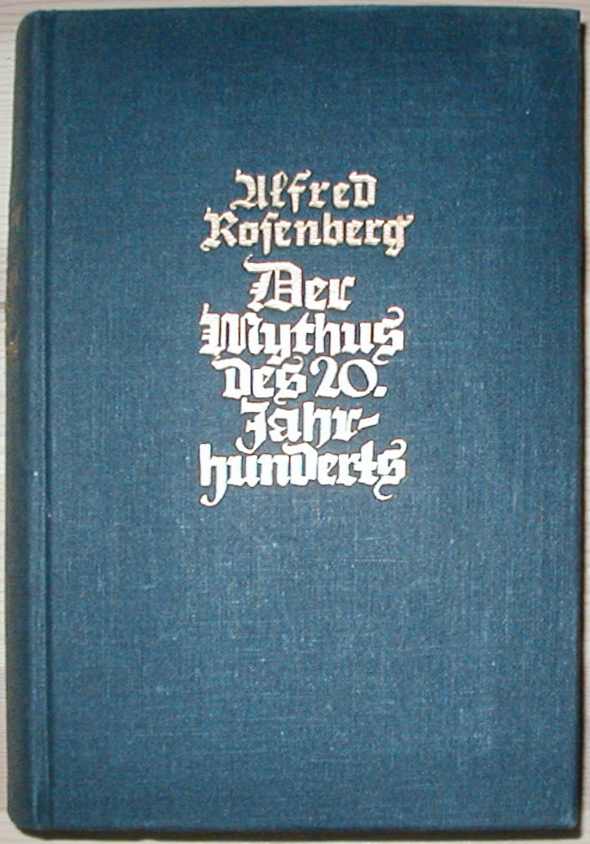
Book cover of "The Myth of the Twentieth Century" by Alfred Rosenberg, which Aflaq purchased a copy while in France.

Ba'athism has been criticized by Western observers as similar in form to Nazism, specifically regarding its historic antisemitism, authoritarian and nationalist tendencies. The historian Stephen Wild in his 1985 paper National Socialism in the Arab near East between 1933 and 1939 briefly draws a direct line between these two ideologies. He cites the fact that Michel Aflaq, one of the founding fathers of Ba'athism, purchased a copy of Alfred Rosenburg's The Myth of the Twentieth Century. He also quotes Sami al-Jundi:

Whoever has lived during this period in Damascus will appreciate the inclination of the Arab people to Nazism, for Nazism was the power which could serve as its champion, and he who is defeated will by nature love the victor....

We were racialists, admiring Nazism, reading its books and the source of its thought, particularly Nietzsche's Thus Spoke Zarathustra, Fichte's Addresses to the German Nation and H.S. Chamberlain's Foundations of the Nineteenth Century which revolves on the race. We were the first to think of translating Mein Kampf.

The Lebanese academic Gilbert Achcar disagreed with Wild's analysis in his 2010 book, The Arabs and the Holocaust: the Arab-Israeli War of Narratives. He claims that Wild's translation was out of order, out of context and incorrect. The full, correctly translated al-Jundi quote was:

We were racialists, admiring Nazism, reading its books and the source of its thought, particularly Nietzsche's Thus Spoke Zarathustra, Fichte's Addresses to the German Nation and H.S. Chamberlain's Foundations of the Nineteenth Century and Darré's The Race (Note: Achcar argues that the two paragraphs were out of order in the Wild's 1985 paper. He also claimed that Wild mistranslated "and Darré's The Race" as "which revolves around race". "Darré's The Race" refers to Richard Walther Darré's 'Neuadel aus Blut und Boden' which was translated into French as "La race: Nouvelle noblesse du sang et du sol". (Achcar, 2010, p. 66)). We were the first to think of translating Mein Kampf.

Whoever has lived during this period in Damascus will appreciate the inclination of the Arab people to Nazism, for Nazism was the power which could serve as its champion, and he who is defeated will by nature love the victor. But our belief was rather different....

We were idealists, basing social relationships on love. The Master [Zaki al-Arsuzi] used to speak about Christ.

He also cites a 1938 essay by al-Arsuzi where he argues that the two major Semitic groups, Arabs and Jews, should unite:

As for the Jews, my opinion is that Arabs and Jews should come to an understanding in this world and cooperate in order to re-establish the Arabs' glory and realize the Semitic genius, which is the Judeo-Arab genius.

Achcar argues that al-Arsuzi was still a racist in ideology, even drawing criticism by al-Jundi himself, who called al-Arsuzi a "racist who believed in authenticity and nobility, a man of an aristocratic temperament and turn of mind." Jalal al-Sayyid, who founded the Ba'ath party with Aflaq and Salah al-Din al-Bitar, went further, saying of al-Arsuzi:

"His education had made him too categorical. He made no place for socialist values in his political philosophy and had greater affinities for Nazi or even ancient Roman thought, categorizing people as slaves or masters, nobles or plebeians."

Achcar believes that Aflaq was more invested in communism during his time in 1930s France, citing the fact he was on the four member editorial committee of the communist paper Al-tali'a, which produced antifascist articles such as "The Nazi Brutes Murder Their Adversaries" and "Everyday Racism under Hitler". Aflaq wrote an article in 1935 where he praised the "communist revolutionary" in contrast to the "fascist warrior". Aflaq later also joined the Lebanese Communist journal Al-Tariq, which published papers for The League Against Nazism and Fascism. Aflaq also published an essay in 1938 which warned against "the nationalism that comes to us from Europe", which Achcar suggests that "no reader could have doubted whose nationalism he had in mind". Achcar argues that scholars such as Stefan Wild and Bernard Lewis mischaracterized early Ba'athism by relying on truncated or mistranslated excerpts from al-Jundi's memoirs, asserting that such interpretations overemphasize Nazi influence while ignoring the movement's early anti-fascist and communist-aligned writings. Götz Nordbruch in his 2009 book Nazism in Syria and Lebanon: the Ambivalence of the German Option, 1933–1945 claims that Aflaq was neither a member of the Communist Party, nor took an active role in its activities. Aflaq and al-Bitar organized support for the fascist backed Iraqi government during the Anglo-Iraqi War through the Syrian Committee to Help Iraq. (Note: al-Arsuzi disagreed with the committee saying "I do not cooperate with anyone. It is better that we stand on our feet". In a response to al-Jundi, he elaborated: "Are you crazy? The British are encircling Syria from all sides, they will soon occupy us. Do you want us to be hanged like traitors – without even any profit for the people?!" (Nordbruch, 2009, p. 179)) Nordbruch translates al-Jundi as:

We were racialists admiring Nazism, reading its books and the sources of its thought, particularly Nietzsche's Thus spoke Zarathustra, Fichte's Addresses to the German Nation, H.A. [sic] Chamberlain's The Foundations of the Nineteenth Century, and Darre's The Race. We were the first to think about translating [Hitler's] My Struggle. Anyone who had lived through this period in Damascus can assess the inclination of the Arab people towards Nazism. Nazism was the force that took revenge for them. The defeated naturally admires the victorious. But we were a different school [of thought]. Those who do not get deep into the principles of the Arab National Party – and these principles are the very principles of the Arab Ba'th – might be misled [about the influence of Nazism].

Nordbruch concludes that while early Ba'athist leaders like Aflaq and Zaki al-Arsuzi did not explicitly cite National Socialist texts, early Ba'athist concepts, specifically the "eternal message" (al-risala al-khalida) of the Arab nation and the total rejection of communism, closely paralleled National Socialist tropes and rhetoric.

=== Young Egypt ===
The Young Egypt Party was founded in 1933, and has been criticized as 'fascist'. The party had a youth wing, the 'Green Shirts', which engaged in marches and street battles with the Wafd's Blue Shirts. The founder and leader of the party, Ahmed Hussein had visited Nazi Germany, where he praised the Reichsarbeitsdienst, the organized labor service, as 'a return to true Islamic society, when there was no employer and no employee but all were brothers co-operating together.' In a letter to Hitler, Hussein praised the economic situation and the 'end of class struggle' through compulsory work. In 1934, Hussein visited Eberhard von Stohrer at the German Legation in Cairo, requesting a visa to travel to Germany that year. Stohrer would later refuse to meet Hussein, recording that his party was "extremely weak in terms of its finances" and "of no great significance."

However, Hussein would later criticize Hitler during the Munich Crisis: "If war breaks out now, after all the efforts and sacrifices which England and France have made and which Czechoslovakia has accepted, the meaning of all that is that Hitler is a madman who wishes to destroy the world in order to satisfy his arrogance and his desires." The expansionist policy of the Axis powers was criticized as a 'hysteria of conquest and aggression'. The historian James Jankowski wrote: "All of this should not be taken to mean that Young Egypt was totally negative towards the fascist states; as we shall see in the next chapter, fascist ideas had a considerable impact on the movement, particularly in the later 1930's. But it does show that Young Egypt was not acting as an apologist for the Axis powers in the tense year before the war."

In 1938, the Muslim Brotherhood and the Young Egypt Party lead a boycott of Jewish businesses.

=== Syrian Social Nationalist Party ===
Flag of the Syrian Social Nationalist Party

The Syrian Social Nationalist Party (SSNP) was founded by Antoun Saadeh in 1932 adopted styles of fascism. Its emblem, the red hurricane, was taken from the Nazi swastika, leader Antoun Saadeh was known as az-Za'im (the leader), and the party anthem was sung to the same tune as the German national anthem. He founded the SSNP with a program that Syrians were "a distinctive and naturally superior race". However, when Saadeh found out that the Argentinian branch of the SSNP newspaper had been voicing its outright support for Nazi Germany and the Axis powers, he issued a lengthy letter to the editor-in-chef, restating that the SSNP is not a National Socialist party and that no stance should be taken vis-à-vis the Allies or the Axis.

== Historiography and views on historical representation ==
The Arabic-speaking world has attracted particular attention from historians who have examined the history of Fascism outside Europe. Focusing on the history of pro-Nazi and pro-Fascist forces, these scholars have tended to emphasize the appeal that Fascism and Nazism had across the Arab world. More recently however, this narrative has been challenged by a number of scholars who assert that Arab political debates in the 1930s and 1940s were quite complex. Fascism and Nazism, they argue, were discussed alongside other political ideologies, such as communism, liberalism, and constitutionalism. Moreover, the recent revisionist works have stressed the anti-Fascist and anti-Nazi voices and movements in the Arab world.

This issue was first raised in 1946, when the American Christian Palestine Committee published "The Arab War Effort, a documented account", arguing that the Arabs worked with the Allies with reluctance because they were eager collaborators with the Axis. This sparked a response by the Egyptian nationalist Ahmed Hussein, arguing the document deliberately ignored and underplayed Egypt's contribution to the Allies in the war.

Historian Israel Gershoni described how the Arab–Israeli conflict has created a war of narratives, in which history is used for modern political purposes, overemphasizing the importance of certain events in an attempt to paint an image of eager collaboration:

The grand mufti of Jerusalem al-Hajj Amin al-Husayni and his active involvement in the Jewish genocide have figured prominently in Israeli efforts to prove the tangible collaboration between the "Arab world" and Nazis. Here, it is imperative to distinguish between "official" and academic efforts. Although scholars are certainly more cautious in depicting the Husayni and Arab-Nazi collaboration, sometimes their work mirrors the generalization that indicts Arabs at large as active supporters or sympathizers with Nazism. The Arab-Israeli conflict's escalation and its redefinition as the Palestinian-Israeli conflict reinforced this mutual demonization. On the Israeli-Jewish side, it has triggered an emphasis on Holocaust denial and extensive, sometimes disproportionate, study of the intimate Nazi-mufti collaboration that is embodied by Husayni's unabashed enthusiasm for Nazi antisemitism and his historical role in the atrocities.

== See also ==
- Antisemitism in the Arab world
- Antisemitism in 21st-century Germany
- Antisemitism in Islam
- Anti-Zionism
- Arab nationalism
- Armenian genocide and the Holocaust
- Collaboration with the Axis powers
- Contemporary imprints of The Protocols of the Elders of Zion
- François Genoud – Swiss Nazi collaborator (1915–1996)
- Geography of antisemitism
- German nationalism
- History of antisemitism
- History of the Jews during World War II
- History of the Jews under Muslim rule
- The Holocaust
- The Holocaust and the Nakba
- Islam and nationalism
- Islam and other religions
- Islamic–Jewish relations
- Jewish exodus from the Muslim world
- Jews outside Europe under Axis occupation
- Khairallah Talfah, the uncle and father-in-law of Saddam Hussein
- Mediterranean and Middle East theatre of World War II
- Mein Kampf in Arabic
- Muhammad Najati Sidqi
- Muslim supporters of Israel
- New antisemitism
- Operation Atlas
- Racism in the Arab world
- Racism in Germany
- Racism in Muslim communities
- Religion in Nazi Germany
- Religious antisemitism
- Religious aspects of Nazism
- Religious views of Adolf Hitler
- Transport of Białystok children – Murder of 1,200 Jewish children by Nazi Germany
- 13th Waffen Mountain Division of the SS Handschar (1st Croatian) – German mountain division of World War II
- 23rd Waffen Mountain Division of the SS Kama (2nd Croatian) – German mountain division of World War II
- Waffen-SS foreign volunteers and conscripts
- White jihad - combination of post-war Nazism and Jihadism
- Xenophobia and racism in the Middle East

== Bibliography ==
=== Books ===
- Wien, Peter; Wildangel, René (2021). Höpp, Gerhard (ed.). Blind für die Geschichte? Arabische Begegnungen mit dem Nationalsozialismus (in German). Klaus Schwarz Verlag. ISBN 9783112402689.
- Boum, Aomar; Stein, Sarah Abrevaya, eds. (2022). Wartime North Africa: A Documentary History, 1934-1950 (1st ed.). Stanford University Press. ISBN 9781503611511.
- Wildangel, René (2021). Zwischen Achse und Mandatsmacht: Palästina und der Nationalsozialismus (in German). Walter de Gruyter. doi:10.1515/9783112402733. ISBN 9783879976409.
- Ahmida, Ali Abdullatif (2020). Genocide in Libya. Routledge. ISBN 978-0-367-46889-7.
- O'Sullivan, Adrian (2019). The Baghdad Set: Iraq through the Eyes of British Intelligence, 1941–45. Palgrave Macmillan. ISBN 978-3-030-15182-9.
- Boum, Aomar; Stein, Sarah (2018). The Holocaust and North Africa (1st ed.). Stanford University Press. ISBN 978-1503607057.
- Gershoni, Israel; Schroeter, Daniel J.; Webman, Esther (2018). Nicosia, Francis R.; Ergene, Boğaç A. (eds.). Nazism, the Holocaust, and the Middle East: Arab and Turkish Responses. Berghahn Books. ISBN 9781785337840. LCCN 2017050574.
- Jackson, Ashley (2018). Persian Gulf Command: A History of the Second World War in Iran and Iraq. Yale University Press. ISBN 9780300221961.
- Nasser, Saman (December 2018). Arab nationalism in interwar period Iraq: A descriptive analysis of Sami Shawkat's al-Futuwwah youth movement (Master of Arts thesis). James Madison University. Archived from the original on 9 December 2023.
- Nicosia, Francis (2015). Nazi Germany and the Arab World. Cambridge University Press. ISBN 9781107067127.
- Gershoni, Israel (2014). Arab Responses to Fascism and Nazism: Attraction and Repulsion (First ed.). University of Texas Press. ISBN 978-0-292-75745-5.
- Motadel, David (2014). Islam and Nazi Germany's War. Harvard University Press. ISBN 9780674724600.
- Aboul-Enein, Youssef; Aboul-Enein, Basil (2013). The Secret War for the Middle East: the Influence of Axis and Allied Intelligence Operations during World War II. Naval Institute Press. ISBN 9781612513362.
- Kalman, Samuel (2013). French Colonial Fascism: The Extreme Right in Algeria, 1919-1939. Palgrave Macmillan. ISBN 9781137307095.
- Bashkin, Orit (2012). New Babylonians: A History of Jews in Modern Iraq. Stanford University Press. ISBN 9780804778756.
- Gensicke, Klaus (2011). The Mufti of Jerusalem and the Nazis: The Berlin Years [Der Mufti von Jerusalem und die Nationalsozialisten. Eine politische Biographie Amin el-Husseinis] (in German). Translated by Gunn, Alexander Fraser. Vallentine Mitchell. ISBN 9783534208081.
- Achcar, Gilbert (2010). The Arabs and the Holocaust: The Arab-Israeli War of Narratives. Henry Holt and Company. ISBN 9781429938204. OCLC 229026316.
- Black, Edwin (2010). The Farhud: Roots of the Arab-Nazi Alliance in the Holocaust. Dialog Press. ISBN 978-0914153146.
- Gershoni, Israel (2010). Confronting Fascism in Egypt: Dictatorship vs Democracy in the 1930s. Stanford University Press. ISBN 978-0-8047-6343-1.
- Mallmann, Klaus-Michael; Cüppers, Martin (2010). Halbmond und HakenKreuz: das Dritte Reich, die Araber und Palästina [Nazi Palestine: The Plans for the Extermination of the Jews in Palestine] (in German). Translated by Smith, Krista. Enigma Books. ISBN 978-1929631933.
- Bashkin, Orit (2009). The Other Iraq: Pluralism and Culture in Hashemite Iraq. Stanford University Press. ISBN 9780804759922.
- Nordbruch, Götz (2009). Nazism in Syria and Lebanon: The Ambivalence of the German Option, 1933–1945. Routledge. ISBN 9780415457149.
- Herf, Jeffery (2009). Nazi Propaganda for the Arab World. Yale University Press. ISBN 978-0-300-14579-3.
- Wien, Peter (22 February 2008) [2006]. Iraqi Arab Nationalism: Authoritarian, Totalitarian and Pro-Fascist Inclinations, 1932–1941 (2nd ed.). Taylor & Francis. ISBN 9781134204793.
- Satloff, Robert (2006). Among the Righteous: Lost Stories from the Holocaust's Long Reach Into Arab Lands. Public Affairs. ISBN 978-1586485108.
- Schwanitz, Wolfgang G. (2004). Germany and the Middle East, 1871–1945. Markus Wiener Publisher. ISBN 9781558762985.
- Simon, Reeva Spector (2004). Iraq between the Two World Wars: the Militarist Origins of Tyranny. Columbia University Press. ISBN 978-0231117715.
- Lewis, Bernard (1999). Semites and Anti-Semites: An Inquiry into Conflict and Prejudice. W. W. Norton & Co. ISBN 0-393-31839-7.
- Elpeleg, Zvi; Himelstein, Shmuel (1993). The Grand Mufti: Haj Amin al-Hussaini, Founder of the Palestinian National Movement. Routledge. ISBN 9780714641003.
- Krämer, Gudrun (1989). The Jews in modern Egypt: 1914–1952. Publications on the Near East University of Washington. Univ. of Washington Press. ISBN 978-0-295-96795-0.
- Staley Marks, Martha (1985). United States Policy Toward Tunisian Nationalism During World War II (Thesis). Portland State University. doi:10.15760/etd.5548. Archived from the original on 4 February 2023.
- Hirszowicz, Łukasz (1966). The Third Reich and the Arab East (1st ed.). Routledge. ISBN 9781138221888.

=== Book chapters ===
- El Houssi, Leila (2018). "The Ethiopian War as Portrayed in the Italian Fascist and Antifascist Press in Tunisia". In Gorman, Anthony; Monciaud, Didier (eds.). The Press in the Middle East and North Africa, 1850–1950: Politics, Social History and Culture. Edinburgh University Press. ISBN 9781474430623.
- Roberts, Sophie B (2017). "Rupture: Vichy, State Antisemitism, and the Crémieux Decree". Citizenship and Antisemitism in French Colonial Algeria, 1870–1962. Cambridge University Press. pp. 250–296. ISBN 978-1-107-18815-0.
- Katz, Ethan B. (2015). "Jews as Muslims and Muslims as Jews". The Burdens of Brotherhood: Jews and Muslims from North Africa to France. Harvard University Press. pp. 111–154. ISBN 978-0-674-08868-9.
- Ryad, Umar (2014). "A Salafi Student, Orientalist Scholarship, and Radio Berlin in Nazi Germany: Taqi al-Din al-Hilali and His Experiences in the West". In Nordbruch, Götz; Ryad, Umar (eds.). Transnational Islam in Interwar Europe. Palgrave Macmillan. ISBN 978-1349481811.
- Abitbol, Michel (2013). "Confronting Nazism". In Meddeb, Abdelwahab; Stora, Benjamin (eds.). Histoire des relations entre juifs et musulmans: des origines à nos jours [A History of Jewish-Muslim Relations: From the Origins to the Present Day] (in French). Translated by Todd, Jane Marie; Smith, Michael B. Princeton University Press. pp. 349–374. ISBN 9780691151274. LCCN 2013937928.
- Cherif, Fayçal (2011). "Jewish-Muslim Relations in Tunisia during World War II: Propaganda, Stereotypes, and Attitudes, 1939–1943". In Gottreich, Emily Benichou; Schroeter, Daniel J. (eds.). Jewish Culture and Society in North Africa. Indiana University Press. pp. 305–320. ISBN 978-0-253-22225-1.
- Höpp, Gerhard (2010). "The Suppressed Discourse: Arab Victims of National Socialism". The World in World Wars: Experiences, Perceptions and Perspectives from Africa and Asia. Koninklijke Brill NV. ISBN 9789004185456.
- Laskier, Michael M. (1994). "Under Vichy and the Nazi-German Menace: The Jews of North Africa during the 1930s and 1940s". North African Jewry in the Twentieth Century: The Jews of Morocco, Tunisia, and Algeria. New York University Press. ISBN 9780814751299.
- Tripp, Charles (1993). "Ali Mahir and the Politics of the Egyptian Army, 1936–1942". Contemporary Egypt: Through Egyptian eyes. Routledge. pp. 45–71. ISBN 9780203413166.
- Hillgruber, Andreas (1988). "The Third Reich and the Near and Middle East, 1933-1939". In Dann, Uriel (ed.). The Great Powers in the Middle East, 1919-1939. Holmes & Meier. pp. 274–282. ISBN 978-08419-0875-8.
- Cleveland, William L. (1985). "Towards the Axis". Islam Against the West: Shakib Arslan and the Campaign for Islamic Nationalism. University of Texas Press. pp. 135–159. ISBN 9780292775947.
- Nicosia, Francis (1986). "Fritz Grobba and the Middle East Policy of the Third Reich". In Ingram, Edward (ed.). National and International Politics in the Middle East: Essays in Honour of Elie Kedourie. Routledge. pp. 206–228. ISBN 9780714632780.

=== Journal Articles ===
- Tannoury-Karam, Sana (September 2019). "This War is Our War: Antifascism Among Lebanese Leftist Intellectuals". Journal of World History. 30 (3): 415–436. doi:10.1353/jwh.2019.0059. JSTOR 26787624. S2CID 208811735.
- Abbasi, Mustafa (29 November 2017). "Palestinians fighting against Nazis: The story of Palestinian volunteers in the Second World War". War in History. 26 (2): 227–249. doi:10.1177/0968344517696527. JSTOR 26746701. S2CID 159934639.
- Kehoe, Thomas J; Greenhalgh, Elizabeth M (November 2017). "Living Propaganda and Self-Serving Recruitment: The Nazi Rationale for the German-Arab Training Unit, May 1941 to May 1943". War in History. 24 (4): 520–543. doi:10.1177/0968344516641457. JSTOR 26393389. S2CID 159514420.
- Goldenbaum, Hans (16 July 2016). "Nationalsozialismus als Antikolonialismus: die deutsche Rundfunkpropaganda für die arabische Welt" [National Socialism as Anti-Colonialism: German radio propaganda for the Arab world]. Vierteljahrshefte für Zeitgeschichte (in German). 64 (3): 449–489. doi:10.1515/vfzg-2016-0022. hdl:11858/00-001M-0000-002C-AA46-4. S2CID 148432426.
- Heckman, Alma Rachel (2016). "Multivariable Casablanca: Vichy Law, Jewish Diversity, and the Moroccan Communist Party" (PDF). Hespéris-Tamuda. 51 (3): 13–34. ISSN 0018-1005. Archived from the original (PDF) on 26 December 2023.
- Lauzière, Henri (2016). "Islamic Nationalism through the Airwaves: Taqī al-Dīn al-Hilālī's Encounter with Shortwave Radio, 1937–39". Die Welt des Islams. 56 (1): 6–33. doi:10.1163/15700607-00561p03. Archived from the original on 8 February 2024.
- Benyoussef, Lamia (2014). "Year of the Typhus: Operation Torch through the eyes of Tunisian women, or how to make the Holocaust an Arab story?" (PDF). International Journal of Francophone Studies. 17 (1): 51–75. doi:10.1386/ijfs.17.1.51_7.
- Boum, Aomar (23 September 2014). "Partners against Anti-Semitism: Muslims and Jews respond to Nazism in French North African colonies, 1936–1940". The Journal of North African Studies. 19 (4): 554–570. doi:10.1080/13629387.2014.950175. S2CID 144799112. Archived from the original on 19 November 2023 – via Taylor & Francis.
- Bernhard, Patrick (2013). "Borrowing from Mussolini: Nazi Germany's Colonial Aspirations in the Shadow of Italian Expansionism". The Journal of Imperial and Commonwealth History. 41 (4): 617–643. doi:10.1080/03086534.2013.836358. Archived from the original on 3 August 2023.
- Gershoni, Israel (2012). "Why the Muslims Must Fight against Nazi Germany: Muḥammad Najātī Ṣidqī's Plea". Die Welt des Islams. 52 (3/4): 471–498. doi:10.1163/15700607-20120A10. JSTOR 41722008.
- Nordbruch, Götz (2012a). "Islam as a 'Giant Progressive Leap' – Religious Critiques of Fascism and National Socialism, 1933-1945". Die Welt des Islams. 53 (3/4): 499–525. doi:10.1163/15700607-20120A11. JSTOR 41722009.
- Nordbruch, Götz (2012b). "The Arab World and National Socialism : Some reflections on an ambiguous relationship". Orient-Institut Studies. 1. Archived from the original on 26 December 2023.
- Wien, Peter (2012). "Arab Fascism – Arabs and Fascism : Empirical and Theoretical Perspectives". Orient-Institut Studies. 1. Archived from the original on 26 December 2023.
- Wild, Stefan (2012). "Adolf Hitler: Enemy of the Arabs' Enemies? : Myth and Propaganda". Orient-Institut Studies. 1. Archived from the original on 26 December 2023.
- Wildangel, René (1 January 2012). "The Invention of "Islamofascism". Nazi Propaganda to the Arab World and Perceptions from Palestine". Die Welt des Islams. 52 (3–4): 526–544. doi:10.1163/15700607-20120A12. JSTOR 41722010.
- Baldinetti, Anna (September 2011). "Fascist Propaganda in the Maghrib". Geschichte und Gesellschaft. 37 (3): 408–436. doi:10.13109/gege.2011.37.3.408. JSTOR 41303599.
- Mostafa, Kabha (September 2011). "The Palestinian National Movement and its Attitude toward the Fascist and Nazi Movements 1925-1945". Geschichte und Gesellschaft. 37 (3): 437–450. doi:10.13109/gege.2011.37.3.437. JSTOR 41303600.
- Wien, Peter (September 2011). "The Culpability of Exile. Arabs in Nazi Germany". Geschichte und Gesellschaft. 37 (3): 332–358. doi:10.13109/gege.2011.37.3.332. JSTOR 41303596.
- Cordier, Bruno de (2010). "The Fedayeen of the Reich: Muslims, Islam and Collaborationism During World War II". The China and Eurasia Forum Quarterly. 8 (1): 23–46. Archived from the original on 10 December 2023.
- Herf, Jeffery (2009a). "Nazi Germany's Propaganda Aimed at Arabs and Muslims During World War II and the Holocaust: Old Themes, New Archival Findings". Central European History. 42 (4): 709–736. doi:10.1017/S000893890999104X. JSTOR 40600977.
- Nordbruch, Götz (15 February 2007). "Defending the French Revolution during World War II: Raif Khoury and the Intellectual Challenge of Nazism in the Levant". Mediterranean Historical Review. 21 (2): 219–238. doi:10.1080/09518960601030142. S2CID 143527421 – via Tayler & Francis.
- Dieterich, Renate (July 2005). "Germany's Relations with Iraq and Transjordan from the Weimar Republic to the End of the Second World War". Middle Eastern Studies. 41 (4): 463–479. doi:10.1080/00263200500119217. JSTOR 4284383. S2CID 143971862.
- Nafi, Basheer M. (Spring 1997). "The Arabs and the Axis: 1933-1940". Arab Studies Quarterly. 19 (2): 1–24. JSTOR 41858205.
- Wild, Stefan (1 January 1985). "National Socialism in the Arab Near East Between 1933 and 1939". Die Welt des Islams. 25 (1–4): 126–173. doi:10.1163/157006085X00053. JSTOR 1571079.
- Nicosia, Francis (November 1980). "Arab Nationalism and National Socialist Germany, 1933-1939: Ideological and Strategic Incompatibility". International Journal of Middle East Studies. 12 (3): 351–372. doi:10.1017/S0020743800026350. JSTOR 163006. S2CID 161300717.
