= Barid Al Sharq =

Arabic language propaganda newspaper in Nazi Germany (1939–1944)

- Publisher: Reichs-Rundfunk-Gesellschaft; Propaganda Ministry
- Editor: Kamal al Din al Galal
- Founded: October 1939
- Ceased publication: 1944
- Political alignment: Nazism; Antizionism
- Language: Arabic
- Headquarters: Berlin
- Country: Germany
- Circulation: 5000 (as of 1943)

Barid Al Sharq (Arabic: بـريـد الـشـرق, lit. 'Orient Post') was a propaganda newspaper published in Berlin in the period 1939–1944. It was distributed in the Arab world to improve the relations between Nazi Germany and Arabs.

== History and profile ==
Barid Al Sharq was launched in October 1939. The headquarters of the newspaper was in Berlin, and the founding publisher was the foreign language service of the Reichs-Rundfunk-Gesellschaft, Nazi broadcasting corporation. From 1941 Barid Al Sharq was published directly by the Propaganda Ministry. The paper was distributed to Arabs countries and European countries where Arab exiles lived.

The editor of the paper was Kamal al Din al Galal who was working at the Islamic Culture Center in Berlin. Shakib Arslan and Abdurreshid Ibrahim were among the contributors. One of its goals was to promote Amin al-Husseini, Grand Mufti of Jerusalem, as the leader of Arabs, emphasizing the similarities between National Socialism and Islam. It often published the speeches of Adolf Hitler and Amin al-Husseini and articles about the ideology of Nazism as well as about the colonial ambitions of the United States, the United Kingdom and the Soviet Union over Arab countries. In 1943 Barid Al Sharq had a circulation of nearly 5,000 copies. It folded in 1944.

The issues of Barid Al Sharq are archived by the German National Library in Leipzig and the Berlin State Library.
