= Baccarat (1929 film) =

1929 film

- Directed by: Adelqui Migliar
- Written by: Lucie Derain; Adelqui Migliar
- Based on: Souris d'hôtel by Paul Armont and Marcel Gerbidon
- Produced by: Alexandre Kamenka
- Starring: Ica von Lenkeffy; Suzanne Delmas; Elmire Vautier
- Cinematography: Nicolas Frenguelli; Nikolas Roudakoff
- Production company: Films Albatros
- Distributed by: Les Films Armor; Woolf and Freedman (UK)
- Release date: 9 August 1929
- Running time: 83 minutes
- Country: France
- Languages: Silent; French intertitles

Baccarat (1929)

Baccarat (French: Souris d'hôtel) is a 1929 French silent comedy film directed by Adelqui Migliar and starring Ica von Lenkeffy, Suzanne Delmas and Elmire Vautier. The film's sets were designed by the art director Lazare Meerson.

== Cast ==
- Ica von Lenkeffy as Rita
- Suzanne Delmas as Suzanne
- Arthur Pusey as Jean Frémeaux
- Elmire Vautier as La comtesse de Charillon
- Yvonneck as César
- Louis Pré Fils as Norbert Clavel
- Louis Alberti as Le policier des jeux
- Isaure Douvan as Gérôme, le maître d'hôtel

== Bibliography ==
- Goble, Alan. The Complete Index to Literary Sources in Film. Walter de Gruyter, 1999.
- Rège, Philippe. Encyclopedia of French Film Directors, Volume 1. Scarecrow Press, 2009.
