= Lucie Derain =

French film journalist

Lucie Derain (born Lucienne Antoinette Louise Déchorain, 1902–1977) was a French film journalist, filmmaker and author. She co-founded the Ciné-club de la femme in the 1930s, and worked with a young Henri Langlois, who went on to found the Cinémathèque Française. Derain's career encompassed many aspects of cinema of the 1920s and 1930s, from titling newsreels to writing screenplays to directing films, as well as reviewing for the major film periodicals in France.

== Career ==
Lucie Derain began her career in film as a subtitler for newsreels in 1919. She went on to work for Films Albatros, a production company in Paris mainly run by Russian émigrés. In the 1920s she wrote the French subtitles for American films distributed in France, and some screenplays of her own. She was a contributor to various film journals and magazines including Cinéa and Cinémonde, sometimes writing in praise of the Albatros filmmakers.

Harmonies de Paris (1927)

Among the short films Derain directed was the only example of a city symphony film made by a woman, Harmonies de Paris (1927). This 25-minute 35mm film, photographed by Nicolas Rudakoff, was made to screen as part of the programme for René Clair's Les Deux Timides (1928), and went on to be shown in Britain alongside Clair's La Tour (1928). Her short Désordre (1927, 16mm, now lost) was screened in Paris in 1930 alongside films by Mack Sennett and William Wyler.

In the 1920s and 1930s there was an audience in France for the adaptation of films into books, known as novelizations or 'films racontés'. Derain authored many novelizations for the publisher Jules Tallandier's series 'Cinéma Bibliothèque'.

Derain was active on the ciné-club scene in 1930s Paris. She was programming for the Ciné-Club Mercredi in the mid-1930s and became the director of the Ciné-Club des Femmes by 1936. Under her leadership the club screened films of interest to women at the Marignan cinema in the centre of Paris, sometimes introduced by prominent female intellectuals, for instance Yvonne Netter presented George Cukor's Little Women (1933) in 1935.

In later life Derain wrote two novels, Carrousel du Nuit (1946) and Brelador (1957).

== Family ==
Derain's older sister was the landscape painter Rolande Déchorain.

== Filmography ==
=== As director ===
- 1927: Désordre (in collaboration with Jean Tarride, lost)
- 1928: Harmonies de Paris

=== As writer ===
- 1928: Harmonies de Paris
- La Tour de vie et de mort

=== As titler ===
- 1928: Destin de femme (Should a Girl Marry?)
- 1929: Souris d'hôtel (Baccarat)
- 1933: Le Faubourg (Oкраина, The Patriots, Outskirts)
