= Bel Hadj El Maafi =

Imam and Algerian/French resistance fighter

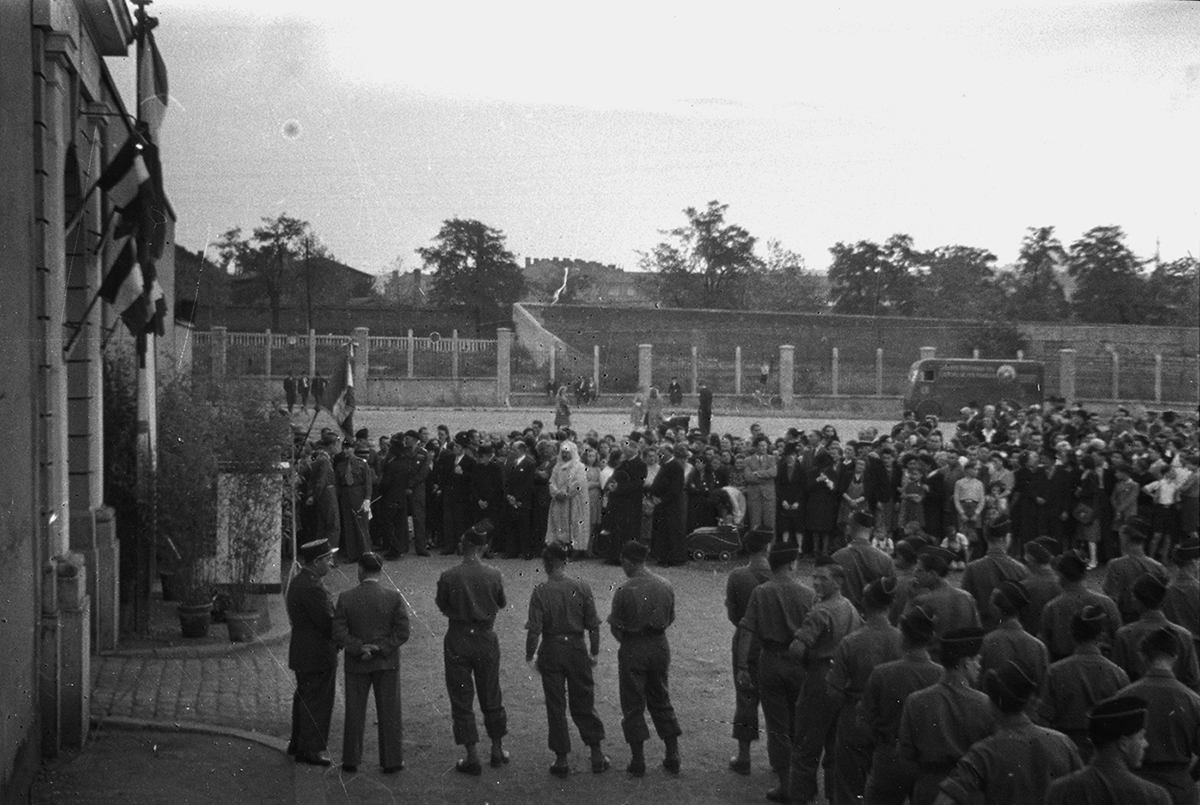
- Bel Hadj el Maafi (in white) in 1947, in front of the Montluc prison, during a commemoration of the French Resistance
- Born: October 25, 1900; Lichana, near Biskra, Algeria
- Died: February 22, 1999 (aged 98)
- Occupations: Imam, mufti
- Known for: Resistance activities during World War II, collaboration with French authorities during Algerian War

Bel Hadj El Maafi (in Arabic: بَلْحَاجّ ٱلْمْعَفِي), sometimes called Bel Hadj Ben Maafi (October 25, 1900 – February 22, 1999), was a French-Algerian imam, marabout, resistance fighter and mufti born in the oasis of Lichana, near Biskra. He practiced in the city of Lyon from 1923 until his death.

As a privileged intermediary between the French authorities and Algerians in Lyon, he engaged in the Resistance and saved numerous Jews during World War II.

Before and during the Algerian War, El Maafi chose to collaborate with the French authorities and remained opposed to Algerian independence. His ties with the French authorities made him a target, and as part of the Café Wars between the National Liberation Front (FLN) and the Algerian National Movement (MNA), he was targeted in an attack by the FLN from which he survived.

Despite the different political currents during the Algerian War, Bel Hadj El Maafi remained highly appreciated by the Muslim community in Lyon until his death. This was mainly due to his longevity and his visits to prisoners, the sick, and Muslim soldiers. However, he left a mixed impression among some former FLN militants.

He was the first imam in Lyon and the first Muslim cleric to have a mosque in the city.

== Youth and interwar period ==
Bel Hadj El Maafi was born on October 25, 1900, in the oasis of Lichana, ten kilometers from the city of Biskra, in French Algeria. He came from a family of imams, his father Maafi was also an imam, and his brother, who shared the same name, was a military chaplain who was Mort pour la France on April 28, 1918, in Verona, Italy, during World War I at the age of 21. His mother's name was Salam Khadouje.

After studying the Quran, he moved to metropolitan France in 1923. He was sent to Lyon by the Rahmaniyya Sufi brotherhood to which he belonged, and which was the largest brotherhood in Algeria at that time. More precisely, it was the leader of the zawiya of Tolga, Hadj Ben Ali Ben Othman, who sent him to Metropolitan France. He was a sufi marabout, meaning a sufi religious leader of Northern Africa.

Upon his arrival, his knowledge of the French language was very poor, but he gradually learned. In 1923, he became a military chaplain for a regiment of tirailleurs.

From the 1930s onwards, El Maafi collaborated with the French authorities. He became the assistant secretary of the Committee for the Protection of North African Workers and also served as an auxiliary for the North African Services of the Rhône Prefecture. One of his tasks was to monitor the Algerian community and identify individuals involved in the independence movement. In this capacity, he assisted Julien Azario, a civil servant in the prefecture who was a French Resistance member and recognized as Righteous Among the Nations, in his surveillance work.

In 1933, with the assistance of Lyon's mayor, Édouard Herriot, and the prefect of Rhône, Achille Villey-Desmeserets, he requested the opening of the first Muslim place of worship in Lyon. However, this request was denied by the Minister of Interior, Camille Chautemps. He stated:

"These so-called mokkadems seek, under the cover of religious proselytism, purely temporal advantages, notably gifts of money extorted from their Muslim coreligionists."

In addition to these connections, during the interwar period, El Maafi served as a military chaplain. He also visited Muslim inmates on death row from 1931 onwards, including Sada Abdelkader, who was sentenced to death for shooting two police officers during his arrest. El Maafi was actively involved in providing spiritual support to the sick, often visiting hospitals.

== French Resistance ==
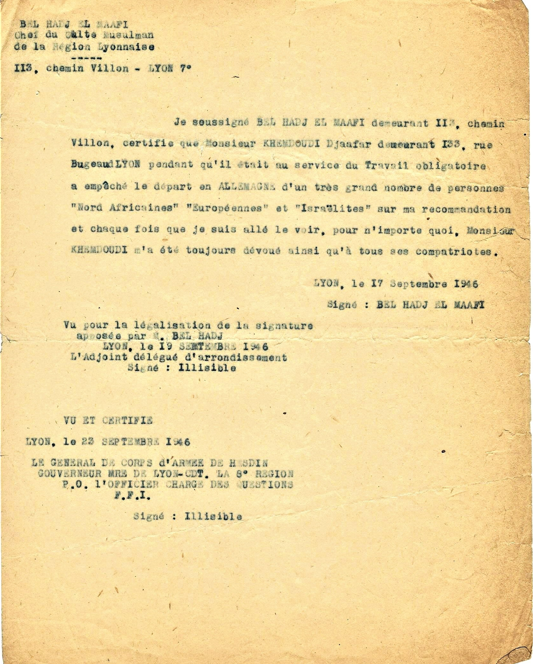
Testimony of Bel Hadj El Maafi about Djaafar Khemdoudi

During the occupation of France, El Maafi joined the resistance and appeared to have various roles. Firstly, he provided information to the French internal resistance about Muslim resistance fighters to prevent infiltrators and collaborators from penetrating the resistance. In this capacity, he is believed to have recruited Djaafar Khemdoudi to join the resistance, as expressed in a letter to the military governor of Lyon in 1946. He affected sympathy, with Julien Azario, towards the collaborationist authorities, but resisted in secret. Thus, he sacrificed a sheep at the Maison des Africans in Saint Antoine street on December 8, 1943, the day of Eid al-Adha, in the presence of Alexandre Angeli, collaborationist prefect of the Rhône, Julien Azario and the head of the Lyon's Milice. He also participated in such a ceremony in 1942.

Furthermore, although he never openly discussed it, he is said to have saved numerous Sephardic Moroccan Jews, particularly the community in the town of Saint-Fons, according to a report from the Renseignement généraux in 1950. The report stated that :

"he often took advantage of his role as an interpreter for the North African Brigade to obtain false identity cards for Moroccan Jews, especially those from the commune of Saint-Fons."

This rescue of Jews in Saint-Fons is likely to be related to the actions of Djaafar Khemdoudi in the same town, where he saved Jewish children. He acted also in connection with Jacob Kaplan, Chief Rabbi of France, and Pierre Gerlier, Cardinal and Archbishop of Lyon.

El Maafi also established networks with the religious resistance against Nazism, clandestinely burying the dead from the resistance and bombings alongside Brother Benoît, a fellow resistance member, with whom he maintained a friendly relationship after the war. They both participated in demonstrations organized by former resistance fighters. He also had friendly relations with Pastor Roland de Pury and Father Chaillet, two other resistance fighters.

== After the War ==
=== Resistance as an unifying force and the break of the Algerian War ===
As the Second World War came to an end, El Maafi continued to participate in meetings of former resistance fighters and demonstrate alongside them. He represented Algerian resistance fighters and prisoners from Montluc prison during official ceremonies and actively spoke out about the Holocaust starting from 1945 to 1950. El Maafi represented an idea of national unity around the resistance, and that was the message he sought to convey in his speeches. He sought to establish closer ties with the Jewish communities in metropolitan France, many of whom came from North Africa and lived in the same areas as Muslims. In 1948, he took part, with the Chief Rabbi of Lyon, Salomon Poliakof and the Archbishop of Lyon, Pierre Gerlier, in a pilgrimage to the mass grave of the Bron massacre, where 109 prisoners, including 72 Jews, were executed by the Nazis. On October 10, 1948, El Maafi attended the inauguration of a monument in Lyon in honor of the Jews of Lyon who had died during the Holocaust.

On February 17, 1949, he was made a Knight of the Ordre du Mérite social, for his action within the social works of Lyon.

Bel Hadj El Maafi was caught off guard by the Algerian War. He was fully integrated into the society of former resistance fighters but found himself in a complicated situation facing growing Algerian nationalism and Anti-Colonialism among his fellow Algerians and coreligionists. He chose to maintain an anti-independence stance, and the Renseignements généraux testified that :

"During the events in Algeria, Bel Hadj El Maafi consistently expressed pro-French sentiments."

Due to his connections with France, the Rhône prefecture and the Algerian National Movement, he became a target of an assassination attempt, which he survived on April 23, 1957, in the midst of the Café War. The perpetrator of the attack, Amar Akbache, one of the leaders of the FLN of Lyon, refused to see him before being executed, considering him a collaborator with the colonial power.

He continued to participate in public actions; in 1959, he intervened during a trial to make a Muslim swear his innocence on the Quran, while the man was accused of theft by one of his co-religionists. The individual was then released, for lack of evidence, the judge trusting his profession of faith.

== Later years and death ==
He continued to participate in the commemorations of the Second World War and the Shoah as well as to direct his mosque, the first in Lyon, which he had obtained in the meantime, and which was located in a small room lent by Catholic nuns, in the Croix-Rousse district, 11 Montée Lieutenant-Allouche. Until his death, he received dozens of co-religionists there daily, for prayers, burials and other religious practices.

On January 6, 1972, he signed a joint text against racism with Alexandre Renard, archbishop of Lyon and cardinal, pastor Yves Dargigue, president of the Reformed Church of Lyon and Jean Kling, chief rabbi of Lyon, where he declared:

All men, created in the image of God, are brothers and must be respected in their difference. Every believer must ask himself about the real, concrete, immediate scope of this teaching and be fully aware of his responsibility before God and before the world.

On December 27, 1976, after the death of thirteen disabled children and their instructor a few days earlier, who drowned in Lyon, including some Muslims, he intervened during the multi-confessional service to say a few words in their memory, alongside Francisque Collomb, mayor of Lyon, Alexandre Renard, and Pierre Doueil, prefect of the Rhône.

On June 11, 1978, he was appointed Officer of the Ordre national du Mérite in recognition of his services as a hospital chaplain by the Mayor of Lyon, Louis Pradel. He was later awarded the rank of Knight of the Légion d'Honneur in 1984 and Commander of the Ordre national du Mérite in 1989.

He met Pope John Paul II in Lyon in 1986.

He died on February 22, 1999, at the age of 99. According to Le Monde, he was highly esteemed by the Muslim community for his numerous visits to the families of the sick, prisoners, and Muslim soldiers. However, his memory was mixed among some former FLN militants.

== Decorations ==
- Knight of the Legion of Honour
- Commander of the Ordre national du Mérite (after being Officer)
- Knight of the Ordre du Mérite social

== See also ==
- Kaddour Benghabrit
- Abdelkader Mesli
- Djaafar Khemdoudi
