= Julien Azario =

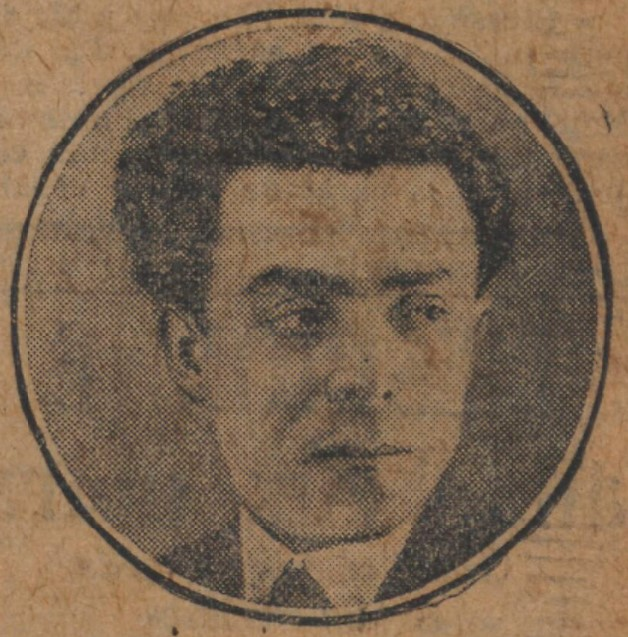
- Born: 15 March 1890
- Died: 30 March 1972
- Occupation: Police officer
- Awards: Righteous Among the Nations (France, 1993)

Julien Pierre Azario (March 15, 1890, in Souk Ahras - March 30, 1972), nicknamed the "Caïd", was a high-ranking French police official in the prefecture of Lyon. He was notable for being a particularly violent colonial administrator towards those under his supervision and for selflessly saving many Jews during The Holocaust, which led to his imprisonment in the Fort Montluc.

For his assistance to Jews during World War II, he was posthumously awarded the title of Righteous Among the Nations.

== Biography ==
Julien Azario was born on March 15, 1890, in Souk Ahras. He first served in Morocco and French Algeria as a colonial administrator and spoke Arabic fluently.

=== Interwar Period ===
In 1919, he became a police inspector and, in 1921, the deputy commissioner of La Guillotière. In mainland France, Azario was involved in surveillance and control activities targeting the North African population. He was close to the Croix-de-Feu and received the nickname "Caïd" for his tough methods.

On October 24, 1925, he established the Committee for the Protection of North African Workers in Lyon, which replaced the S.A.I.N.A. association that was supposed to organize the Algerian community and effectively prevented its creation. Publicly, this association was supposed to "especially help and advise [the North Africans]," but according to the Ministry of the Interior's directives, it was rather meant to "subject the North Africans to particularly rigorous registration and divert them from agitation created for exclusively political purposes." In 1926, he was implicated in legal matters regarding Algerian people who died in Lyon. He would have then lied during his depositions.

Azario used North African recruits as strikebreakers and cut off North Africas in Lyon from the aid they should have received from the state. Additionally, he managed to establish control over employment, meaning North Africans in the Rhône region could not find jobs without his explicit approval. Azario decided who could eat at the soup kitchen. He deported all Algerians whose political views he disapproved of, particularly targeting communists or left-wing sympathizers. Azario was also in charge of deportations; in 1926, under the pretext of a move to Corsica for employment, he sent back over one hundred and fifty Algerians to French Algeria. Azario was also in charge of monitoring and controlling the Italians in Lyon during this period, although such a task occupied him much less, and he was relatively less violent and more moderate in this regard.

These methods led to numerous official complaints, but the authorities did not follow up on them. During this period, Azario was in contact with Bel Hadj El Maafi, who assisted him in his surveillance tasks. He also stood out by instituting a semi-official ceremony where he demanded submission and an apology from Algerians who had offended or conflicted with him. In 1935, Lyon Républicain targeted him for his methods of deporting Algerians.

In 1936, after a demonstration involving 3,000 North Africans, being personally targeted by the national press, and the rise to power of the Popular Front, he was dismissed for the first time. However, he managed to more or less retain a similar position by slowing down his actions.

He continued his investigative work; for example, Azario testified against an Italian who had killed his former wife and investigated thefts or trafficking committed in Lyon.

Generally, he applied a colonial perspective to the situation in Lyon, importing his colonial logic to the mainland; this attitude seemed to exacerbate tensions within Lyon's society rather than alleviate them. Azario is considered one of the fathers of the French approach to immigration, which is marked by its colonial past and forms.

In his personal life, he was involved in painting and sculpture. In 1940, he presented some of his works, a modeling and a pastel, at an art salon in Lyon.

=== World War II ===
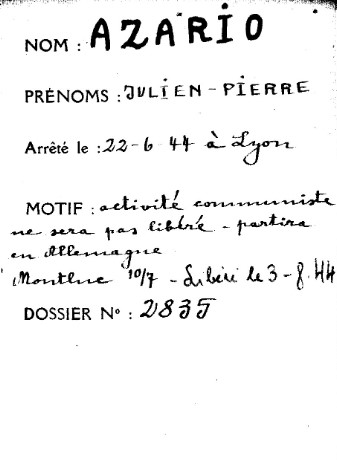
Incarceration papers of Azario

During World War II, Azario distinguished himself, notably in collaboration with Bel Hadj El Maafi, and possibly Djaafar Khemdoudi, in rescuing Jews in the Rhône region. In 1941, the policeman intervened with Algerian and Jewish internees to try to calm the tensions between the two communities in the prison where they are at the time.

He pretended to comply with Vichy authorities and continued his work normally but secretly resisted. For instance, on December 8, 1943, he attended an official ceremony organized by El Maafi at the Maison des Africains on Rue Saint Antoine, on the day of Eid al-Adha, in the presence of Alexandre Angeli, the collaborationist prefect of the Rhône, and the head of the Lyon Milice. He also fought against the black market, particularly the trade of pharmaceutical products.

He freed arrested Jews and provided them with false papers, including the Binik and Bouccara families. He informed certain families about the progress of police investigations against them. The policeman consistently refused any financial compensation. To hide the people and families he was saving, he distributed North African indigènes papers to them and disguised Jews as Muslims, which helped explain their circumcision in case of checks by the Gestapo. While acting in this manner, he had to be cautious of Gestapo informants who integrated themselves into the city's North African population to monitor those within this microcosm.

Azario was arrested on June 22, 1944, incarcerated at Fort Montluc, and released on August 3, 1944. On his imprisonment notice, he was described as a communist and was destined for deportation to Germany.

=== Post-war period ===
After the war, Azario was targeted by a complaint from a Lyon police informant named Mohammed B., and the prefect, tired of his methods, took action to remove him from the Rhône region.

He then became involved in the Algerian War, serving as an important communicator during this period. He was notably responsible for organizing "unveiling" ceremonies, where French colonial propaganda staged the supposed happiness of Algerian women as they unveiled and regained their "freedom".

Azario played a central role in the memorial recognition of the internees of Montluc; thanks to his connections with the French state, he managed to establish a ceremony in front of Fort Montluc, and he organized at least some of the first publications of the ARM (Association of Montluc Resistance), also contributing his drawings. He is also the one who, being a sculptor, created the plaque placed in front of the fort in 1946. It reads:

Here suffered, under the German occupation, 10,000 internees, victims of the Nazis and their accomplices, 7,000 perished. The F.F.I popular uprising liberated the 930 survivors on August 24, 1944.

He died on March 30, 1972, and was awarded the title of Righteous Among the Nations in 1993.

== Analysis ==
Marc André sees Julien Azario as an interesting character with a "sinuous" trajectory.
