= Abdelkader Mesli =

Imam and French resistant member (1902–1961)

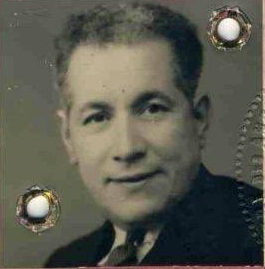
- Identity photograph of Mesli, taken from his Resistance deportee card
- Born: 1902; Khemis, French Algeria
- Died: 21 June 1961 (aged 58–59); Paris, France
- Occupations: Islamic imam, resistance member
- Known for: Resistance activities during World War II, helping rescue Jews

Abdelkader Mesli (Arabic: عَبْد ٱلْقَادِر مَسْلِي, ʿabd ʾal-Qādir Maslī; 1902 – 21 June 1961) was an Algerian Sunni imam and resistance member during the Second World War. Through his actions at the Grand Mosque of Paris, at the Fort du Hâ, and within the Army Resistance Organization (ORA), he contributed to the rescue of several hundred Jews from the Holocaust. He also extended assistance to escaped African soldiers. Having survived Dachau, he returned to France after the war but died in relative obscurity.

His actions were rediscovered long after his death, in the early 21st century. Historians' estimates of the number of Jews he saved vary, but they range between 500 and 1600.

== Biography ==
=== Birth and rise to the imamate ===
Abdelkader Mesli was born in 1902 in Khemis, French Algeria. At the age of 17, he left his native country for Metropolitan France and arrived in Marseille. He worked as a docker, carpenter, mine worker and salesman. In the early 1930s, he was appointed imam of the Grand Mosque of Paris, a position he held on a voluntary basis. At the same time, he was listed in the records of the North African Affairs Service of the Paris Prefecture, which was responsible for spying and monitoring the activities of North Africans in mainland France.

=== Second World War, Resistance and deportation ===
When the Second World War started, Mesli got involved with Kaddour Benghabrit, rector of the mosque, in rescuing Jews by issuing false certificates of Muslim faith. This technique saved between 500 and 1600 people according to historians.

In 1942, Mesli was sent to Bordeaux as Muslim chaplain at the Château du Hâ by Kaddour Benghabrit after Mesli was suspected by the German authorities. He organized escapes there and continued to issue false certificates, despite the suspicions of the Kommandatur. From February 1943 onwards, he became involved in a French Resistance organization by joining the Army Resistance Organization (ORA). In this capacity, he handled forged documents and provided shelter for escaped African soldiers. He had connections with Paul and Roger Valroff, who were his friends and provided assistance. Paul Valroff wrote numerous letters to him, invited him to take care of his son Roger, and expressed his gratitude. For example, on 6 September 1943, Paul Valroff wrote to Mesli:

"I apologize for imposing on you, and I thank you in advance for whatever you will do for a son. I hope to come to Bordeaux very soon and will be delighted to see you again. My dear friend, I send you all my friendship. The staff of the mosque asked me to send their regards to you."

On 5 July 1944, Mesli was denounced and arrested alongside Roger Valroff in a restaurant in Bordeaux by the Gestapo and his home was raided by the French collaborationist police. They confiscated from his home "three suits, an overcoat, two pairs of shoes, six shirts, three pairs of underwear, a dozen handkerchiefs, a gold watch, a gold ring with a stone, and a batch of goods reserved for Muslims." He was deported to Dachau concentration camp, then transferred to Mauthausen. At Dachau, he was assigned the prisoner number 94020, while at Mauthausen, his number was 98671.

Despite extensive interrogations and torture, he did not denounce any resistant comrades.

=== Return to France and last years ===
Carte de déporté résistant (Deportee-Resistance fighter card) for Abdelkader Mesli, issued on July 18, 1950

Mesli was released on 24 May 1945, greatly weakened physically; he then weighed only 30 kg. A resistant deportee card was issued to him, with the identification number 1.001.00526. He then resumed his activity as an imam at the mosque of Bobigny (near Paris) and took care of the Muslim cemetery of Bobigny.

He married Aïcha Mesli on 24 July 1951 at the Grand Mosque of Paris. They had two children together: Yamina Mesli (born in 1950) and Mohamed Mesli (born in 1951). Mesli was appointed as an officer of the Order of the Ouissam Alaouite by Mohammed V, the King of Morocco. He also received the Order of Liberation, the Combatant's Cross, and the Medal for Deportation and Internment for his role in the Resistance. However, he never mentioned these honors during his lifetime, and it was only after his death that his family rediscovered his decorations. On 22 June 1952, he visited the Douaumont ossuary, near Verdun, and took part in a ceremony organized there by Marshal Alphonse Juin as a representative of Kaddour Benghabrit.

He died on 21 June 1961.

== Acknowledgement ==
Mesli's actions were forgotten after the Second World War. It was not until 2010 that his son, Mohamed, rediscovered his father's past and undertook to safeguard this family heritage. Despite Abdelkader Mesli having remained relatively discreet about his involvement in the Resistance, he left behind a substantial body of written work and archives. Dozens of archival documents and testimonies are documented in the files he bequeathed to his children.

Mesli has not been awarded the title of Righteous Among the Nations because precise research has yet to be done by the Yad Vashem memorial. On 12 March 2020, the council of Paris voted unanimously for a street in the French capital to bear the name of Abdelkader Mesli. On 15 October 2021, the forecourt in front of the Grand Mosque of Paris bears his name. A street has been named Abdelkader Mesli in Bobigny in his honor.

On 16 October 2022, French President Emmanuel Macron gave an hommage to Abdelkader Mesli. Regarding his actions, the rector of the Grand Mosque of Paris, Chems-Eddine Hafiz, declared:

My illustrious predecessors have engraved in the national memory a certain idea of humanism. The first rector of the Grand Mosque of Paris, Kaddour Ben Ghabrit, along with Imam Abdelkader Mesli, helped save Jewish people from Nazi barbarism.

== Decorations ==
- Officer of the Order of Ouissam Alaouite (Morocco)
- Medal for Deportation and Internment for his role in the Resistance (France)
- Combatant's Cross (France)

== See also ==
- Si Kaddour Benghabrit
- Bel Hadj El Maafi
- Djaafar Khemdoudi
