= Maurice Tranchant de Lunel =

French architect

Maurice Tranchant de Lunel (25 November 1869, in La Ferté-sous-Jouarre – 1944, in La Seyne-sur-Mer), was a 20th-century French architect and writer.

== Biography ==
An architect of historical monuments in Morocco, de Lunel was the designer of the Grand Mosque of Paris.

In 1912 he was appointed director of the Department of Antiquities, fine art and historic monuments of the French protectorate in Morocco by Lyautey. His mission was to preserve Moroccan monuments and establish a ranking list of historical monuments in Morocco.

From 1920 to 1923 he was inspector of fine arts, antiques, monuments and architect of the Protectorate of Morocco.

He was also a painter (watercolorist), illustrator and writer.

== Selected publications ==
- 1924: Au pays du paradoxe: Maroc (preface by Claude Farrère.)
- 1931: Le tour du monde en un jour à l'Exposition coloniale
- 1933: Je jongle avec les chiffres (Editions du Jardin des Modes)
- 1936: Chansons des quatre saisons
- 1939: La princesse des Baux, légende radiophonique en 4 tableaux avec les anciennes chansons provençales
- 1939: Baba-Yaga, conte radiophonique adaptation d'un conte populaire russe
- 1944: L'alphabet de la famille
- 1945: Petits métiers pour les enfants sages qui deviendront grands
- 1945: Les chansons de l'herbe et de la rosée
- 1945: Vacances en petits morceaux
- 1947: Petite géographie: pour les enfants sages
- 1954: Un Bouquet de proverbes pour les douze mois de l'an 1954

== Sources ==
- François Pouillon, Dictionnaire des orientalistes de langue française, 2012
