= Free Men (film) =

- US-Canadian film poster
- French: Les hommes libres
- Directed by: Ismaël Ferroukhi
- Screenplay by: Ismaël Ferroukhi; Alain-Michel Blanc (fr)
- Produced by: Fabienne Vonier (fr)
- Starring: Tahar Rahim; Michael Lonsdale; Mahmoud Shalaby (fr)
- Cinematography: Jérôme Alméras
- Edited by: Annette Dutertre (fr)
- Music by: Armand Amar
- Production company: Pyramide Productions
- Distributed by: Pyramide Distribution (France)
- Release date: 28 October 2011 (France)
- Running time: 99 minutes
- Country: France
- Language: French
- Box office: USD 1.2 million worldwide

Free Men (French: Les Hommes libres) is a 2011 French war drama film written and directed by Ismaël Ferroukhi, which recounts the largely untold story about the role that Algerian and other Muslims from the Maghreb in Paris played in the French Resistance and as rescuers of Jews during the German occupation (1940–1944).

It features two historic figures: Si Kaddour Benghabrit, rector of the Grand Mosque of Paris, and Salim Halali, an Algerian Jewish singer. The film stars Tahar Rahim playing a fictional young Algerian and Michael Lonsdale as the rector.

== Plot ==
In occupied Paris, the young unemployed Algerian, Younes Ben Daoud, makes a living on the black market. He is arrested by the police, and to avoid prison he agrees to spy on the Paris Mosque. The police suspect that the mosque leadership, including its rector Si Kaddour Benghabrit, is helping resistance fighters and protecting North African Jews by giving them Muslim birth certificates.

While at the mosque, Younes meets the Algerian singer Salim Halali. They become close friends. When Younes learns that Salim is Jewish and sees the work that the people of the mosque are doing, he stops collaborating with the police. The mosque has extended its hospitality to shelter European Jews seeking refuge in Paris and at risk during roundups by the Nazis. He becomes involved with Algerians who are part of the French Resistance, and who are also preparing for their own fight for independence from French colonialism after the war. Gradually he becomes transformed from being a politically ignorant immigrant into a fully fledged resistance fighter.

== Main cast ==
- Tahar Rahim as Younes Ben Daoud
- Michael Lonsdale as Si Kaddour Benghabrit
- Mahmoud Shalaby as Salim Halali
- Lubna Azabal as Warda Shlimane, alias Leïla
- Christopher Buchholz as Major von Ratibor
- Farid Larbi (fr) as Ali
- Stéphane Rideau as Francis
- Slimane Dazi as Larbi
- Bruno Fleury (fr) as The Inspector
- François Delaive (fr) as Head of Gestapo

== Release ==
The film premiered at the 2011 Cannes Film Festival on 19 May 2011, and was released in France and Belgium on 28 September 2011. The film saw a limited (4 screens) US release on 16 March 2012, and a wider (14 screens) UK release on 25 May 2012.

== Historical review ==
Although the singer Selim (Simon) Halali was indeed saved through the issuance of "Muslim" papers, there is no record to support the fact that there was a resistance network within the mosque. Historians Michel Renard and Daniel Lefeuvre also noted in the film several historical approximations, such as the judicial status of Algerians during the colonial era.

== Critical response ==
The performance of Rahim, who starred in A Prophet (2009), was praised by critics in this film.

In February 2013, 28 film critics gave the film an average rating of 75% on Rotten Tomatoes.

The film won the Radio-Canada Audience Award at the 2012 edition of the Cinéfranco film festival.
