= Grand Mosque of Paris =

Mosque in Paris, France

- French: Grande mosquée de Paris; Arabic: مسجد باريس الكبير
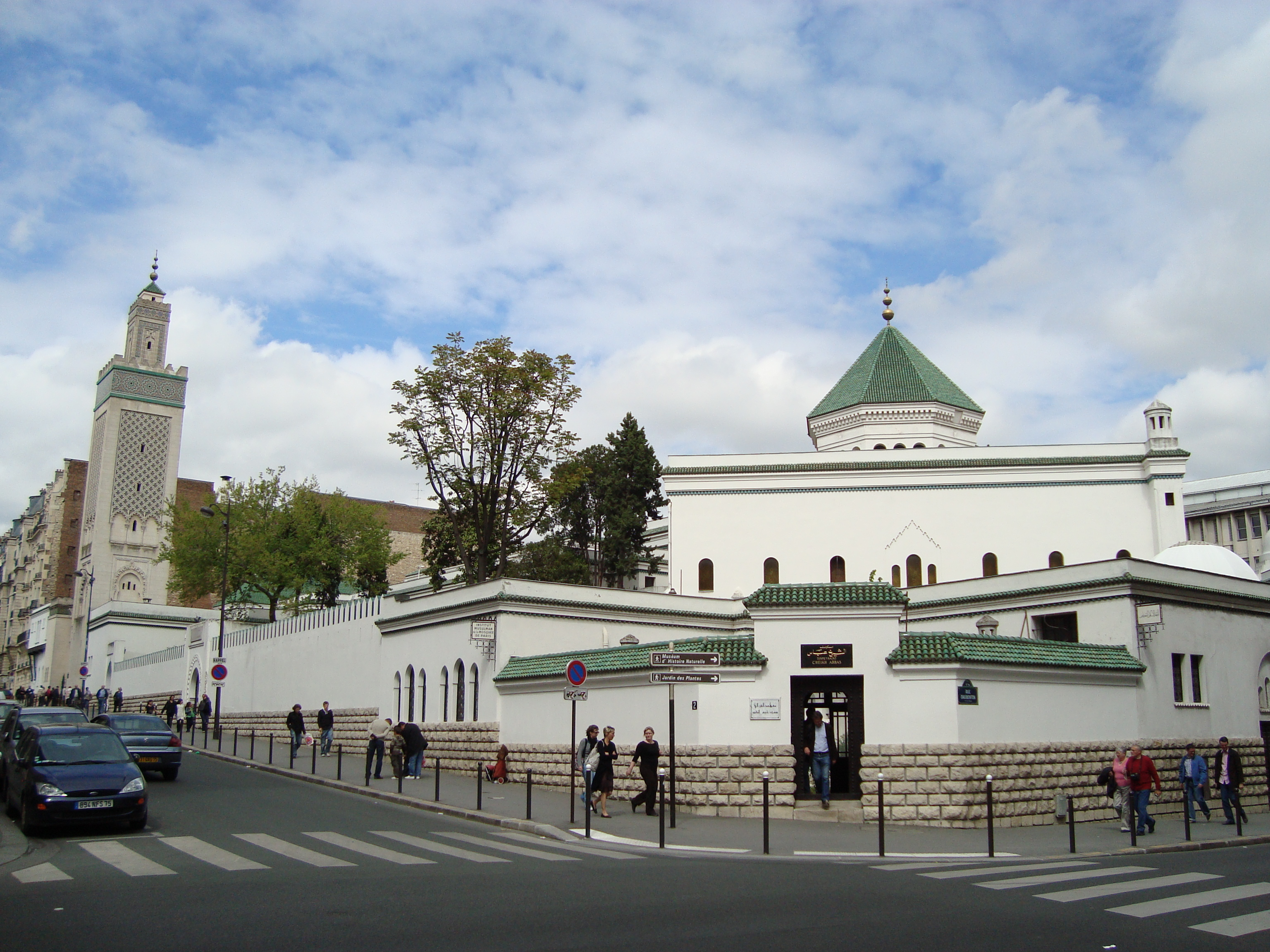
- The Paris Mosque, with its minaret on the left

- Location within Paris

Religion
- Affiliation: Sunni Islam
- Rite: Sufism
- Ecclesiastical or organisational status: Mosque
- Status: Active

Location
- Location: 5th arrondissement, Paris
- Country: France
- Coordinates: 48°50′31″N 2°21′18″E

Architecture
- Architect: Maurice Tranchant de Lunel
- Type: Mosque architecture
- Style: Moorish Revival
- Groundbreaking: 1922
- Completed: 1926

Specifications
- Capacity: 1,000 worshippers
- Interior area: 7,500 m^{2} (81,000 sq ft)
- Minaret: 1
- Minaret height: 33 m (108 ft)

Website
- grandemosqueedeparis.fr (in French)

The Grand Mosque of Paris (French: Grande mosquée de Paris, pronounced [ɡʁɑ̃d mɔske d(ə) paʁi]; Arabic: مسجد باريس الكبير), also known as the Great Mosque of Paris or simply the Paris Mosque, located in the 5th arrondissement of Paris, is one of the largest mosques in France. It comprises prayer rooms, an outdoor garden, a small library, a gift shop, along with a cafe and restaurant. In all, the mosque plays an important role in promoting the visibility of Islam and Muslims in France. Completed in 1926, is the oldest mosque in metropolitan France.

== History ==
=== Genesis of the project ===
The history of the Paris mosque is inextricably linked to France's colonization of large parts of the Muslim world over the course of the nineteenth and twentieth centuries. An early, if not the first, project for a mosque in Paris is recorded as desired to be "in the Baujon district in 1842, followed by a revival of similar intentions at the In 1846, the Société orientale (Eastern Society) proposed the construction "in Paris, then at Marseilles, of a cemetery, mosque, and a Muslim school (collège)." According to the historian Michel Renard, it was put forward "for philanthropic reasons, augmented by political reasons (the recent conquest and pacification of Algeria), but also religious since Muslims were judged to be closer to Roman Catholicism than the Jews." The negative reaction of the Ministry of Justice and Religions, which debated the matter with the National Assembly, shelved the project for ten years.

=== The First "Mosque" at Père-Lachaise ===
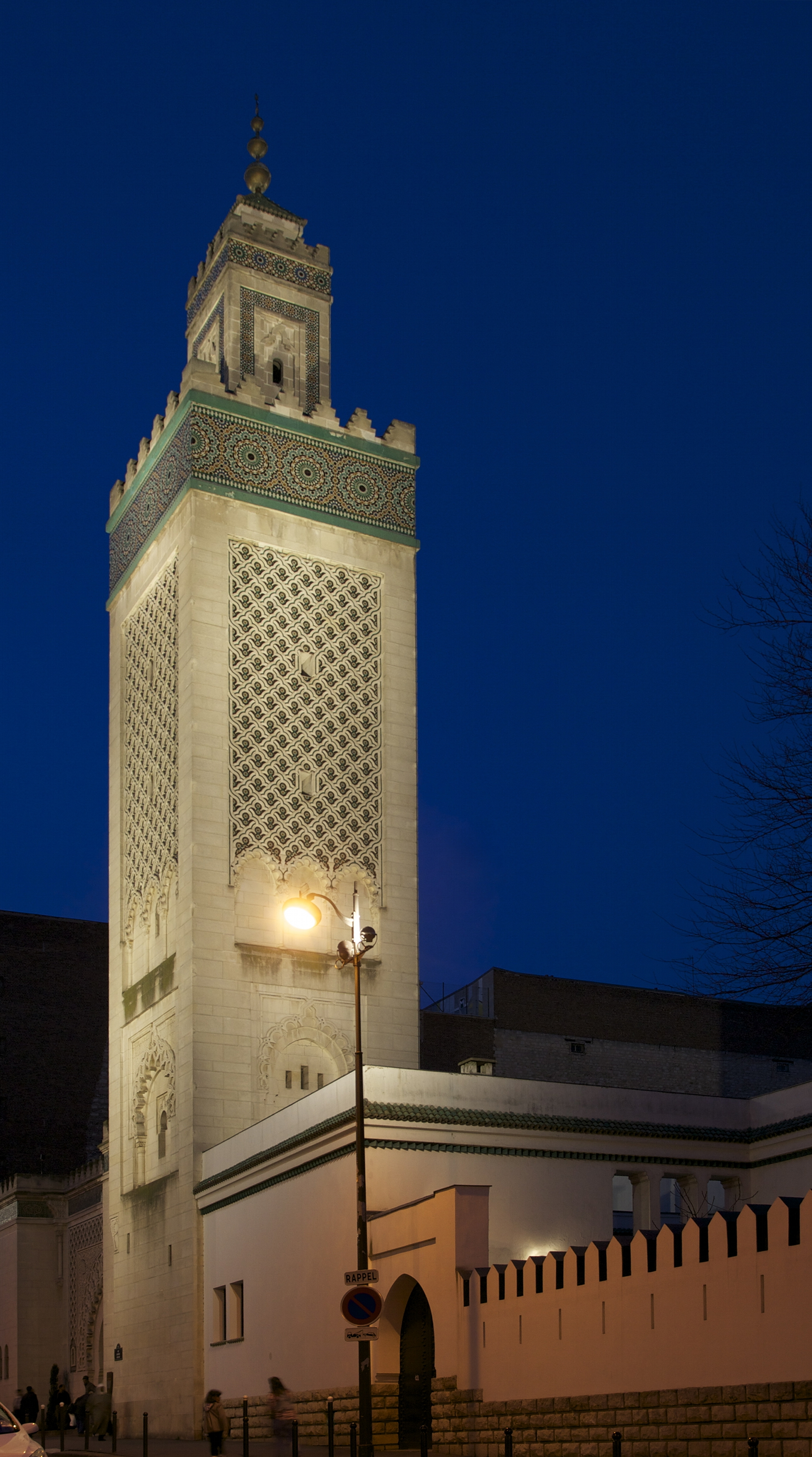
The minaret of the Great Mosque with its crenellated balustrade

A French Prefectorial decree of November 29, 1856 permitted the Ottoman Embassy in Paris to construct a special enclosure that was reserved for the burial of Muslims in the 85th division of the Parisian Cemetery of the East, called Père Lachaise. The enclosure measured about 800 square meters, and in it the Ottomans built a structure labeled as a 'Mosque,' in order to give shelter to funerary services and the prayers for the deceased. It was thus the first mosque constructed on Parisian territory. However, it was not the first in Western Europe since the disappearance of Muslims from the south of France in the ninth century, because there was an earlier mosque that had long been used in Marseille within the boundaries of the Cemetery of the Turks, but it had been destroyed during the French Revolution."

The cemetery covered the tombs of Ottomans who had died in France. Little used, in 1883 it was cut down in size, but soon the building fell into disrepair, so the Ottoman government decided to finance its reconstruction and extension. In 1914, an architectural design was put forward for a more prominent building with a dome and clear "Islamic" characteristics evident, but the First World War blocked the implementation of the project. In 1923, however, an inter-ministerial commission of Muslim affairs discussed the work for completing a Muslim cemetery in Père Lachaise. It concluded that it was not practical to build a mosque in the cemetery, as they were looking to build a mosque in the district of the Jardin des Plantes.

=== 1895 and 1915–16 projects ===
The first project for a true mosque in Paris was envisaged without success in 1895 by the Committee of French Africa set up by Théophile Delcassé, Jules Cambon, the Prince Bonaparte and the Prince d'Arenberg. An article in La Presse from January 12, 1896 was, however, optimistic about this project, specifically for a mosque to be constructed on the Quai d'Orsay, notably with the financial support of the Ottoman sultan, the Viceroy of Egypt, and the Sultan of Morocco.

The journalist Paul Bourdarie justified the construction of the Paris Mosque in the newspaper La Revue indigène:

Such a proposal cannot be forgotten and lost [to history]. It reflects too much the political outlook that France ought to follow towards her Muslim sons, and which should translate above all into acts of political and administrative equality and above all into gestures of sympathy and goodwill. From its foundation in 1906, La Revue indigène has put forward plans to resume this project from which the reforms which she proposes will be recommended and completed with success. The members of the Algerian Muslim delegation in Paris who came to Paris in 1912, Dr. Benthami, Dr. Moussa, the lawyer Mr. Mokhtar Hadj Saïd, etc., recall that the question was addressed at that moment in the course of the meetings which took place at the headquarters of La Revue indigène. In the meantime, Mr. Christian Cherfils, the Islamophile and author of a work on Napoléon and Islam, recommended the erection of a mosque in Paris. Others, without a doubt, view the same construction as both desirable and possible.

Bourdarie evoked, in his article, the contradiction between the alliance with England which worked to dominate the majority of countries in the Muslim world while the French interest was to remain "friends of the Turk according to the wishes of Francis I and Suleiman the Magnificent" and to continue "its role within Muslim Arab power." La Revue indigène believed that the project for the Parisian mosque was one that French citizens knew "to be in accordance with their spirit and their heart's love of their country and the respect of Islam." It was why Bourdarie did not stop lobbying for his project and undertook serious work to get the French government to listen to him.

As Bourdarie confided in his journal:

In May and June 1915, I began conferring with an architect, a student of [Charles] Girault, Mr. E. Tronquois. Our discussions frequently turned towards Islam and the role of French Muslims on the field of battle. Mr. Tronquois expressed the opinion that a mosque would be a veritable commemorative monument to their heroism and their sacrifices. I explained to Mr. Tronquois the facts and points of view previously expressed and we resolved also to get to work. And in the summer of 1916 a certain number of Muslims living in Paris and their friends met several times at the headquarters of La Revue indigène in order to examine and, if need be, critique the sketches of the architect. Among them I recall were the Emir Khaled, having come from the Front and passing through Paris; Dr. Benthami; the mufti Mokrani; Dr. Tamzali and his brother; Halil Bey; Ziane; the painter Dinet; the Countess d'Aubigny; Lavenarde; Christian Cherfils; the deputy A. Prat, etc. Following these meetings, a committee was formed, the presidency of which was offered to Mr. É[douard] Herriot, mayor of Lyon and a senator; the vice-presidencies to Mr. Lucien Hubert, Senator; Marin and Prat, members of the Chamber of Deputies; and A. Brisson, the director of Annales politiques et littéraires. The Interministerial Commission of Muslim Affairs, which knew of the project through Mr. Gout, had given its approval, and Mr. Pichon, former Minister of Foreign Affairs, offered his patronage, and so the project was brought directly to Mr. [Aristide] Briand, president of the Council which approved it.

Bourdarie was truly the father of the project for the Parisian mosque, and he worked tirelessly towards its completion. The first concept for the project was worked up by the architect Maurice Tranchant de Lunel, who was the Director of Fine Arts under Hubert Lyautey from 1912 onwards and a friend of Rudyard Kipling, C. Farrère, and Queen Elizabeth of Belgium.

=== First World War ===
In 1881, the French government established the indigénat in Algeria which enabled punishments, such as being stripped of land, and discrimination towards the colonials. This decree also restricted travel of Algerians internationally and in their own country by requiring permits to travel. In 1905, a strike among the French workforce had French officials look to Algerians to fill this role. The travel limitations were relaxed to allow Algerians to travel and immigrate to France to fill the voids in the labor force. In 1912, the French desire for workers grew as the country grew while also needing additional soldiers for the military. In response, the decree was softened allowing further immigration from Algeria. Shortly afterwards, during World War I France needed more resources to assist ongoing war. France saw large waves of migration of Algerians to France in order to serve in the military and to become laborers. The war saw casualties upwards of 100,000 Algerian soldiers serving the French and a new population of Algerian immigrants into France. As the war came to an end, the French became more accepting of the Muslim people and wanted to celebrate them for their efforts and sacrifices for France.

=== Construction and financing ===
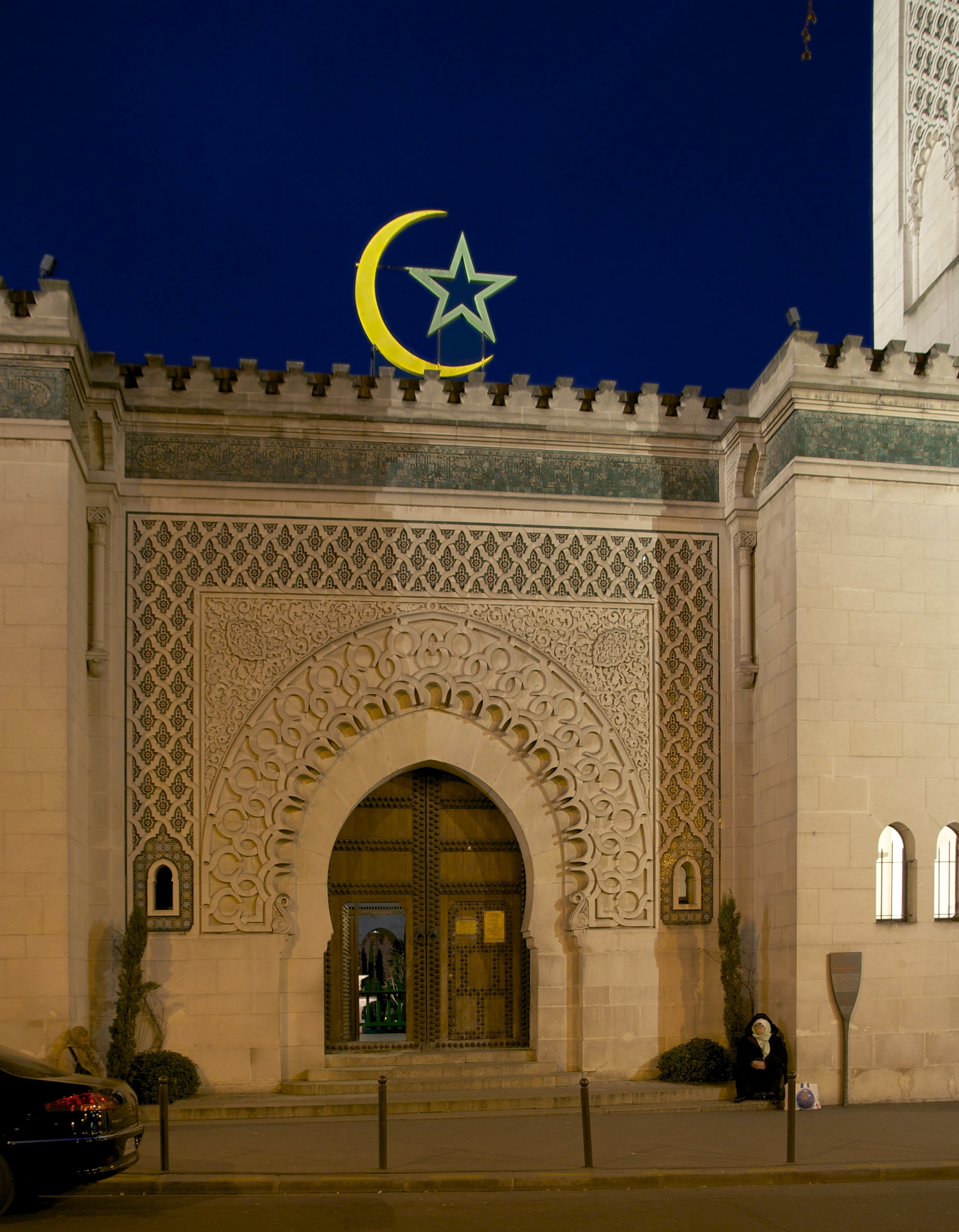
Entrance door of oak, with bronze hardware, surmounted by tracery in eucalyptus wood and a crescent with a star

The decision to construct the mosque resurfaced more precisely in the aftermath of the Battle of Verdun when the Société des Habous was charged with constructing the mosque. This association, created in 1917, had the goal of organizing an annual pilgrimage to Mecca for residents of North Africa and insuring that the pilgrims followed regulations of security and hygiene during their travel to the Hejaz.

The Great Mosque of Paris was funded by the French state as per the law of August 19, 1920, which accorded a subvention of 500,000 francs for the construction of a Muslim Institute composed of a mosque, a library, and a meeting and study room. The law of August 19, 1920 did, however, infringe upon the 1905 French law on the Separation of the Churches and the State promulgating the secular nature of the government, whose signatories had included Edouard Herriot and Aristide Briand themselves. The Great Mosque was built on the site of the former Charity Hospital (Pitié-Salpêtrière Hospital) and adjacent to the Jardin des plantes. The first stone was laid in 1922. The work was completed by Robert Fournez, Maurice Mantout and Charles Heubès based on plans by Maurice Tranchant de Lunel. The mosque was built following the Moorish Revival style, and its minaret is 33 metres (108 ft) high.

=== Inauguration ===
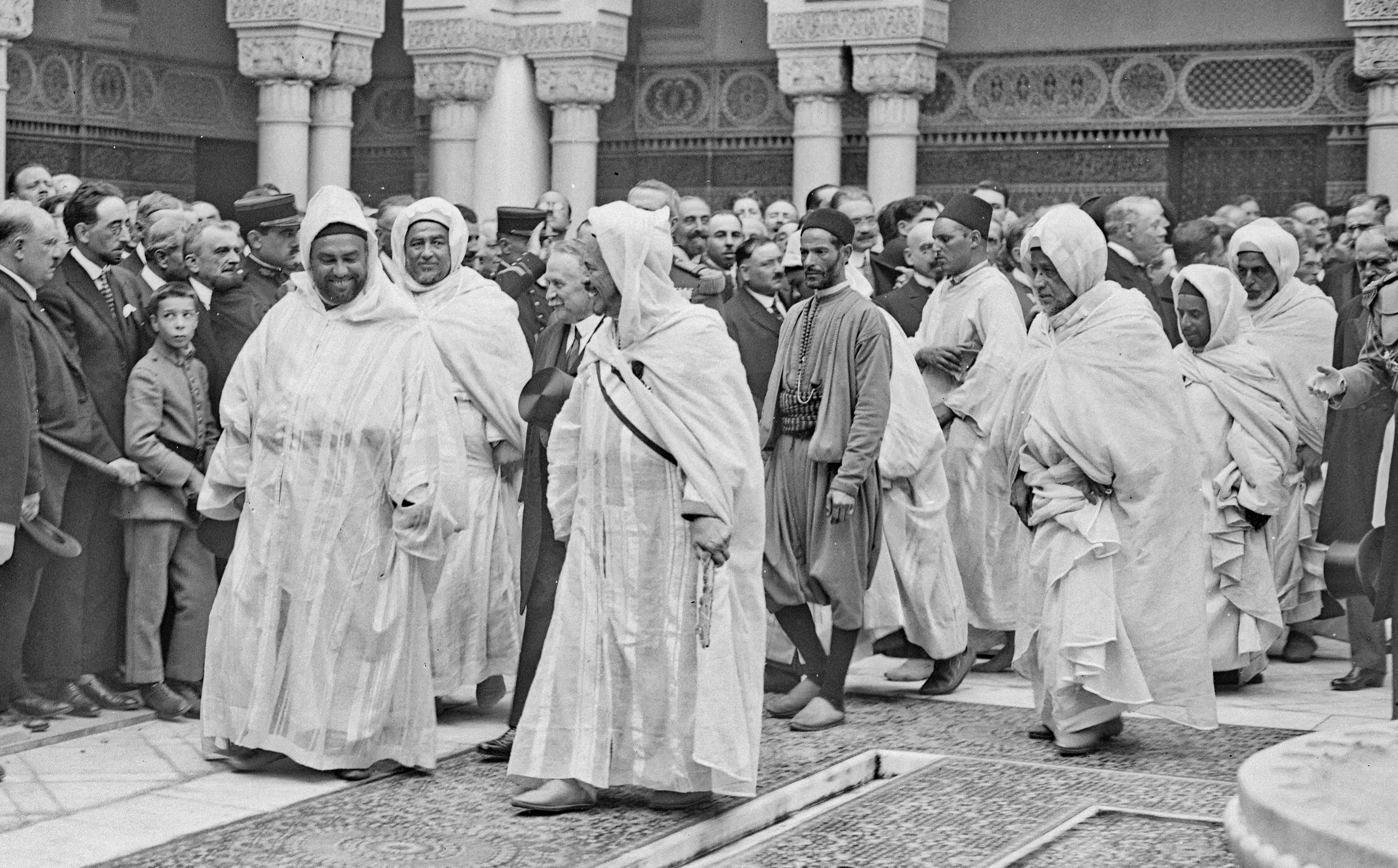
Sultan Yusef, Gaston Doumergue, Abdelqader Bin Ghabrit, Muhammad al-Muqri, and others in attendance at the mosque's inauguration in 1926

It was inaugurated on July 16, 1926, in the presence of French President Gaston Doumergue and Sultan Yusef of Morocco. Doumergue celebrated the Franco-Muslim friendship sealed by the bloodshed on the Western Front in World War I and affirmed that the Republic protected all beliefs. The Sufi Sheikh Ahmad al-Alawi led the first communal prayer to inaugurate the newly built mosque. On the eve of the inauguration, Messali Hadj held the first meeting of the Etoile nord-africaine (North African Star) and criticized the "mosque publicity stunt."

In 1929, King Fuad I of Egypt donated the mosque's minbar, which is still used today.

=== Second World War ===
In a 1991 documentary, director Derri Berkani reported that during the Second World War and the occupation of France by the Nazis, the Great Mosque of Paris served as a site of resistance for Muslims living in France. The Algerians of the Francs-Tireurs et Partisans (FTP; Partisan Snipers) made it their mission to secure and protect British parachutists and find them shelter. Built on caves, the Mosque permitted them to secretly reach the Bièvre, a tributary of the Seine. The FTP also helped Jewish families or families whom they knew or at the request of friends, relocate to the Mosque while waiting for transit papers for passage to the Free Zone or to cross the Mediterranean Sea to the Maghreb. Jewish refugees were given papers declaring that they were Muslim and members of the mosque in order to protect them from persecution. Doctor Albert Assouline recorded some 1600 ration cards (one per person) that had been furnished by the Great Mosque of Paris for the Jews who had found refuge there. This little-known history was recounted in Karen Gray Ruelle and Deborah Durland DeSaix's, The Grand Mosque of Paris: A Story of How Muslims Rescued Jews During the Holocaust, a book for ages 8–12, published in the U.S. in 2009 (also in French and Japanese editions).

Carte de déporté résistant (Deportee-Resistance fighter card) for Abdelkader Mesli, issued on July 18, 1950

The figures concerning the number of Jews housed and saved through the Paris Mosque during this period vary considerably according to various authors. Annie-Paule Derczansky, President of the Association des Bâtisseuses de Paix (Association of the Female Builders of Peace), reports that, according to Albert Assouline, who appears in Birkani's film, 1600 people were saved. On the other hand, according to Alain Boyer, former official working with religions for the French Ministry of the Interior, the number was closer to 500 people.

A call for witnesses to the circumstances of Jews saved by the Great Mosque of Paris between 1942 and 1944 was launched on April 3, 2005, at the same time as the Medal of Justice (médaille des Justes) was awarded by Yad Vashem to the descendants of the rector of the Mosque, Si Kaddour Benghabrit, who had saved the lives of a hundred Jews, including the singer Salim Halali, by giving them certificates of Muslim identity from the administrative personnel of the Mosque, thus allowing them to escape arrest and deportation.

Serge Klarsfeld, the President of the Association des filles et des fils de déportés juifs de France (Association of the Sons and Daughters of Jewish Deportees from France), is, however, more skeptical about the figure of 1500 Jews saved and states that "of the 2,500 members of our organization" there "is nobody who has ever heard of it." He considers, nonetheless, that the campaign to launch an appeal to witnesses undertaken by the Association des Bâtisseuses de Paix to be "positive."

The Franco-Moroccan director Ismaël Ferroukhi made a 2011 film entitled Les hommes libres (The Free Men), about the forgotten history of the Muslim resistance fighters during World War II, with Tahar Rahim and Michael Lonsdale as the leading actors. The film was criticized by the historians Michel Renard and Daniel Lefeuvre, who consider it not particularly serious.

=== Modern history ===
The Grand Mosque plays an important role in French social society, promoting the visibility of Islam and Muslims. The mosque was assigned to Algeria in 1957 by the French Foreign Minister. The Paris Mosque serves as the head mosque for French mosques and is currently led by mufti Dalil Boubakeur, who has served as rector since 1992. In 1993 the Institut Al-Ghazali was founded, a religious seminary for the training of imams and Muslim chaplains. In 1994, Charles Pasqua, then the Minister of the Interior in charge of Religion, gave the Grand Mosque the authority of certifying meat as halal.

On December 12, 2011, an official ceremony marked the start of the construction of a retractable roof covering the great patio facing the prayer hall of the Great Mosque. This important project, long-awaited for many years by its congregants in order to protect them during inclement weather, was an important feature of its original conception in 1922–26.

In November 2012, a prayer room was set up in Paris by a member of the group 'Homosexual Muslims of France' Ludovic-Mohamed Zahed. The opening has been condemned by the Grand Mosque of Paris.

In December 2013, the group Les Femmes dans la Mosquée (Women in the Mosque) demanded from the administration the right to pray in the same room as men, having been excluded from it and relegated to the entrance foyer. The spokesperson of the movement, Hanane Karimi, stated, "The previous policy reflects the organization of the Muslim community along certain conventions today, that women have no place there; they have become invisible."

During the administration of Bertrand Delanoë, some controversies have arisen, such as those who want to give an emphyteutic lease to the Société des Habous and sacred places of Islam. In 2013, the office of the mayor of Paris Anne Hidalgo refused permission of the construction of a second building for the Institut des cultures d'Islam (Institute of Muslim Cultures), citing the 1905 Law of the separation of Church and State.

The Grand Mosque has endured multiple Islamophobic attacks in recent years. In 2015, a man attempted to drive a truck into the mosque, but was stopped by barriers of police officials put outside by the government to prevent racist incidents. On another occasion in 2015 a man scrawled swastikas on the walls of the mosque.

On March 13, 2020, the Grand Mosque of Paris was forced to shut down due to the COVID-19 pandemic. In order to limit the spread of the disease, France banned any gatherings over 100 people. On June 2, 2020, the mosque reopened with requirements including social distancing, capacity, and face coverings. The mosque continued to cease and resume operations as the country entered and exited lockdown several more times.

The Mosque maintains a positive public relations campaign in attempt to dispel common Islamic stereotypes that exist in France. Dr. Dalil Boubakeur is the official face of Islam in France and does everything in his power to provide access to his beliefs through books, interview, and is even a prominent social justice figure.

In 2025 the Grand Mosque of Paris hosted an art exhibition titled "Mosques in Islam" by Algerian artist Dalil Saci, which depicted mosques in a variety of styles, such as Grotesque, Impressionistic, and more.

== Architecture ==
The mosque is inspired by the architecture of North African mosques. For example, the courtyard, horseshoe arches, and green-tiled roofs are inspired by the Qarawiyyin Mosque in Fez, Morocco, while the minaret was inspired by the Zaytuna Mosque in Tunis, Tunisia. The minaret is 33 metres (108 ft) tall. The decorative program of the mosque, in particular the zellij tilework, was entrusted to specialized craftsmen from North Africa using traditional materials. The main entrance portal is ornamented with stylized motifs in Islamic style.

The Great Mosque of Paris covers an area of 7,500 square metres (81,000 sq ft), and comprises:

- A prayer room whose decoration is inspired by many parts of the Muslim world
- A madrasa (school)
- A library
- A conference room
- North african's style gardens covering an area of 3,500 square meters
- Annexes including a restaurant, tea room, hammam, and shops

The mosque, along with the Islamic Center, are listed in the supplementary inventory of Historic Monuments by the decree of December 9, 1983. The edifice is filed under the label of "Twentieth Century Patrimony" (Patrimoine du XXe siècle).

The Great Mosque of Paris can accommodate up to 1,000 people, and authorizes access to women, and provides confessional rooms as well as access for handicapped persons.

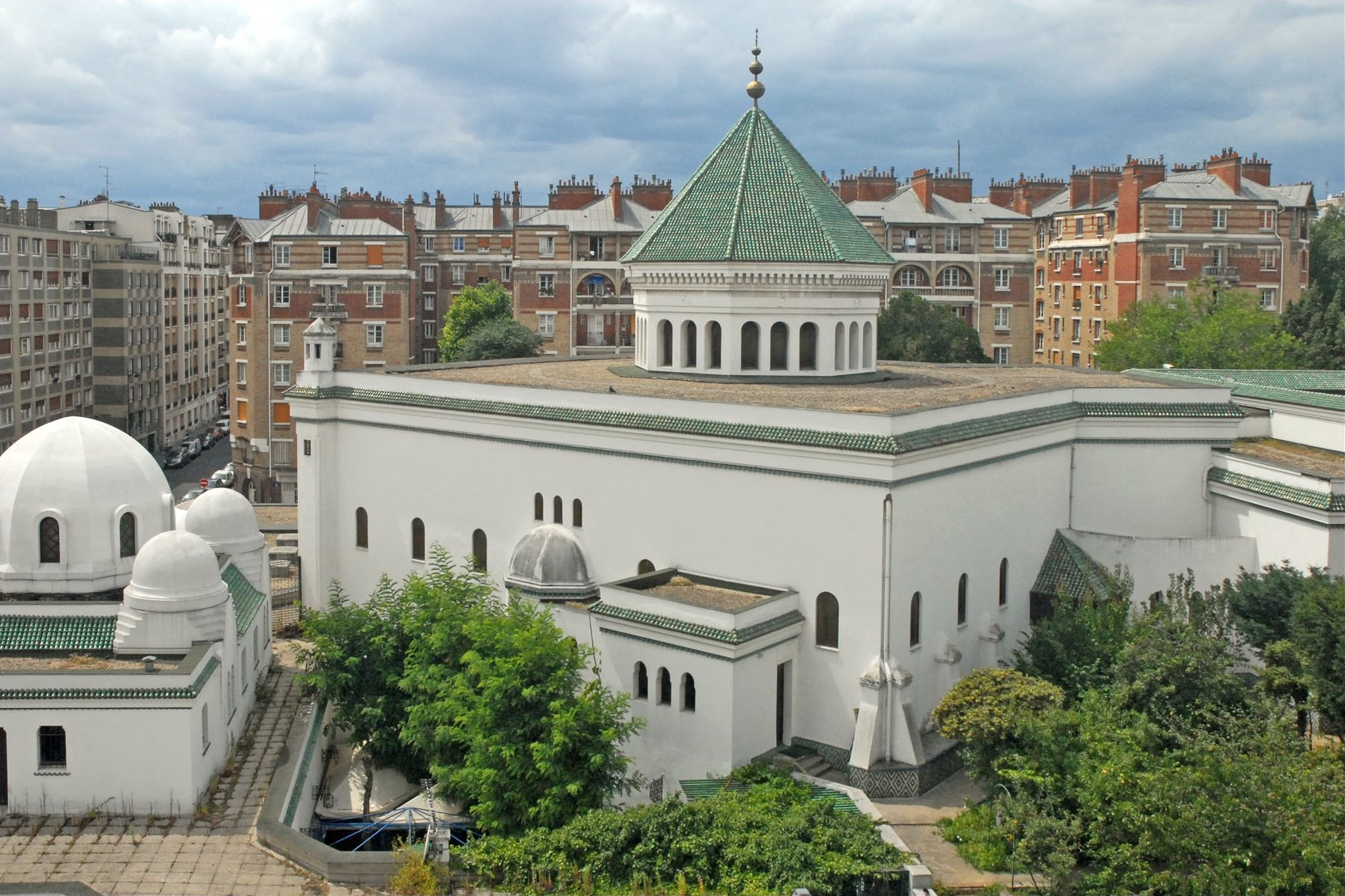
View of the mosque's exerior, with the prayer hall (centre right) and hammam (left)

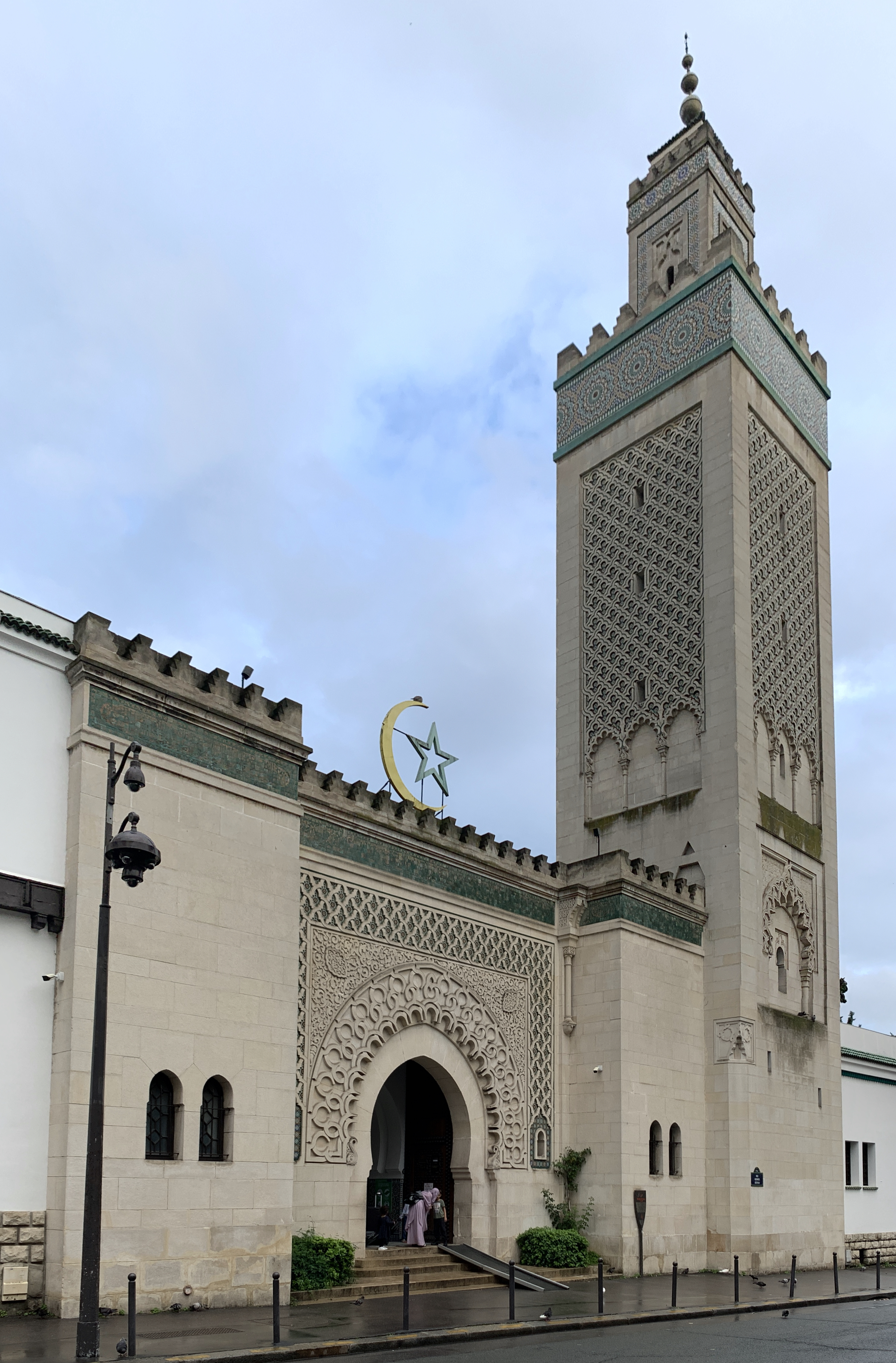
Main entrance and minaret, on the west side of the building

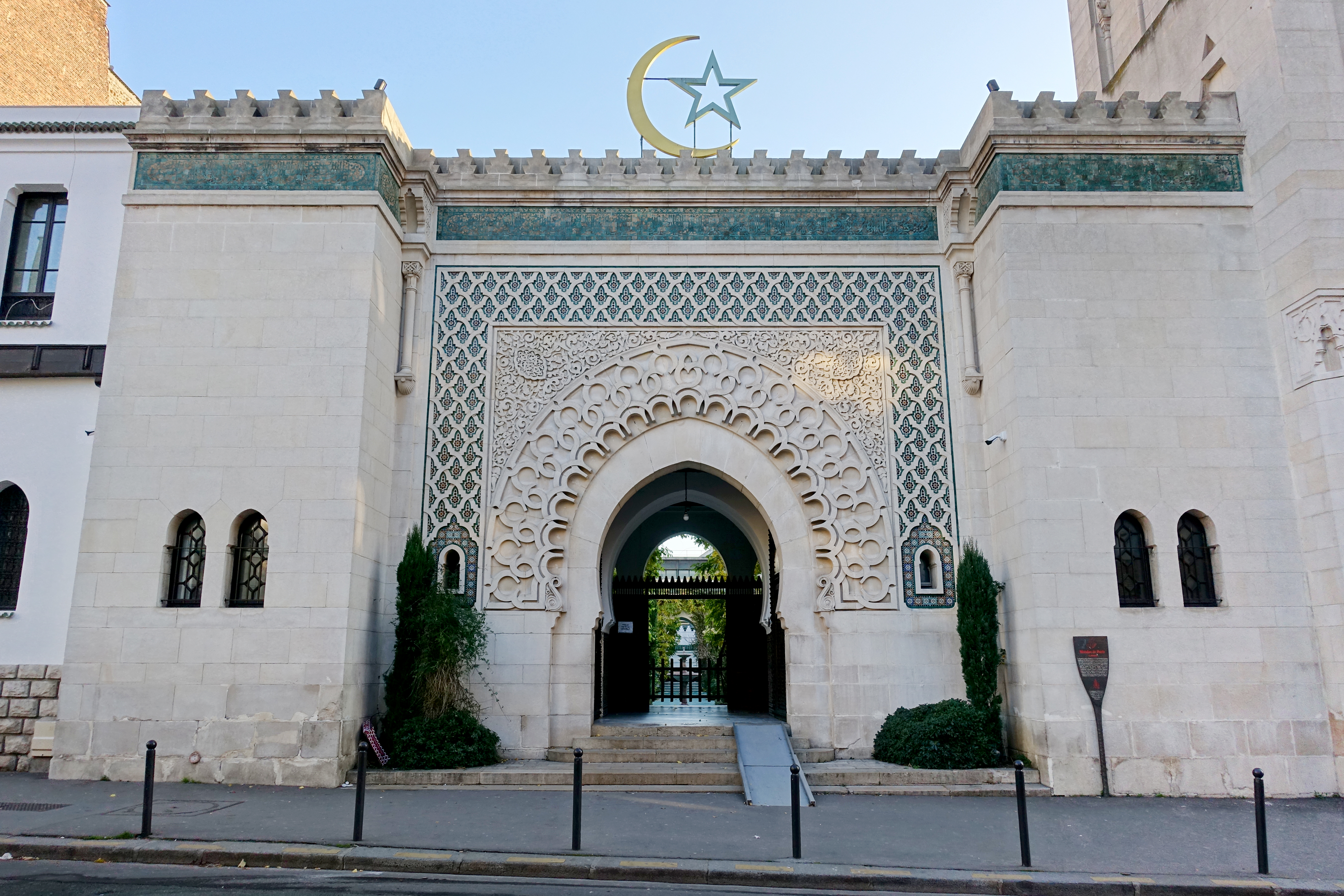
Main entrance portal

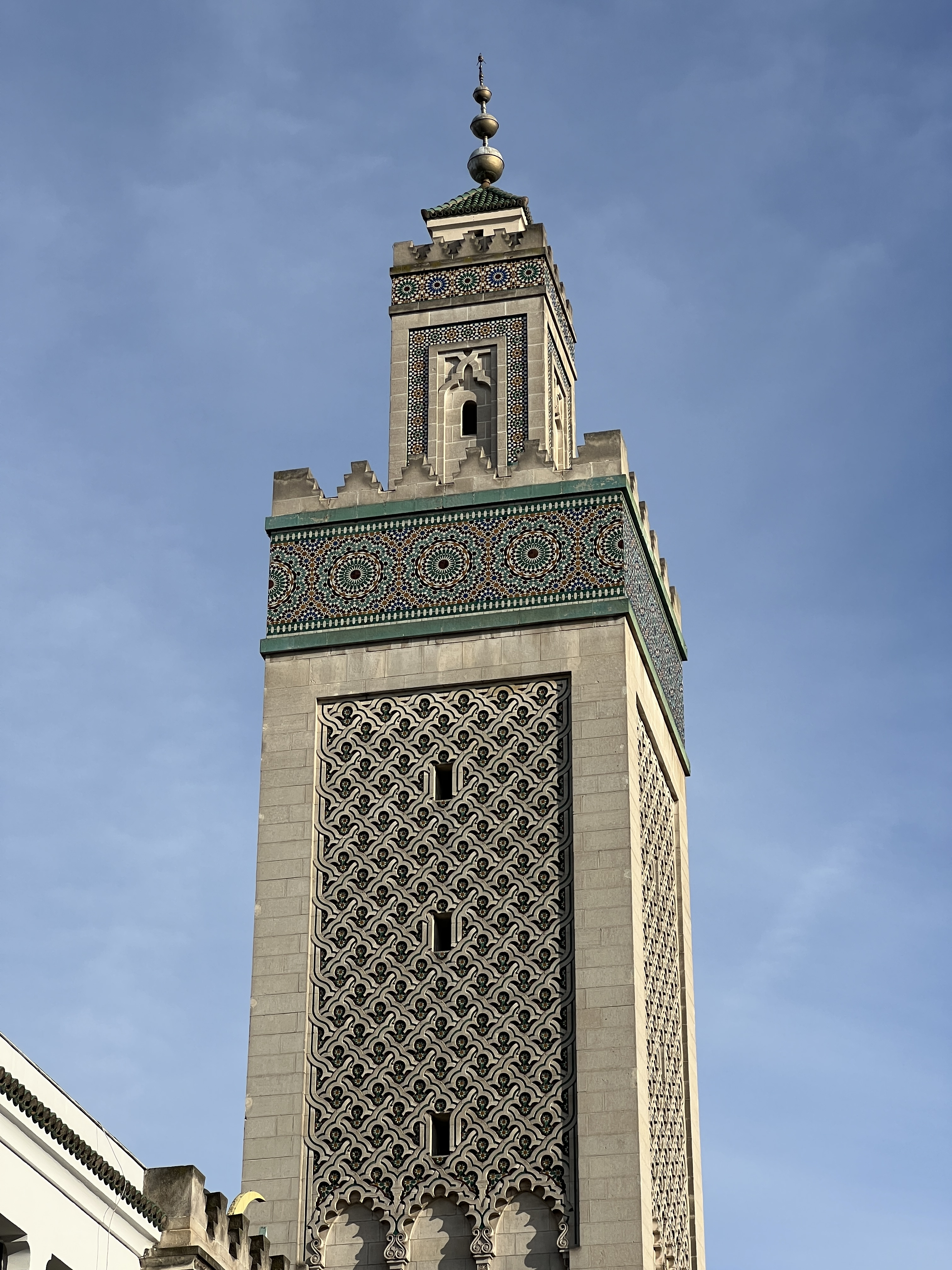
Minaret

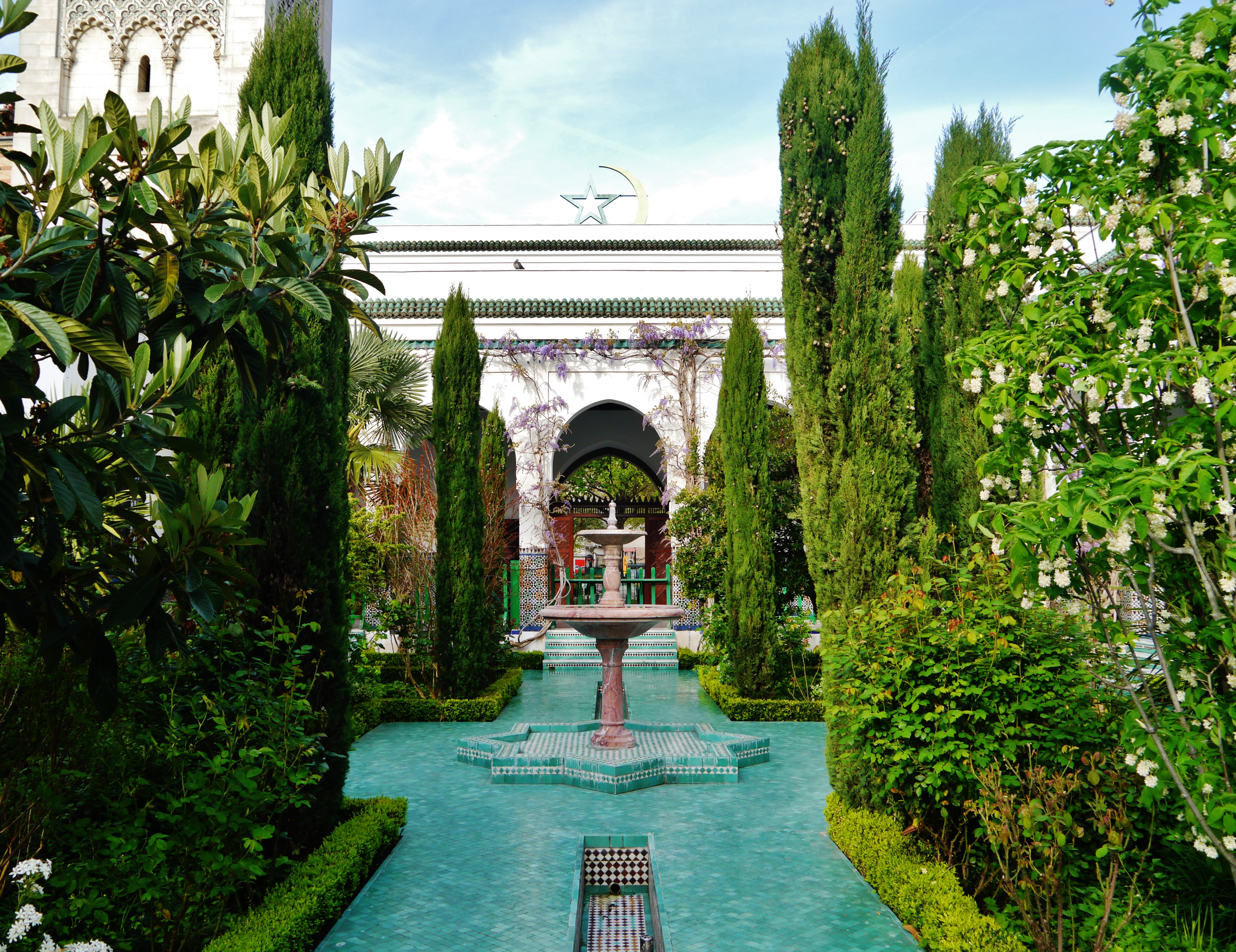
Main garden courtyard, looking west towards the main entrance

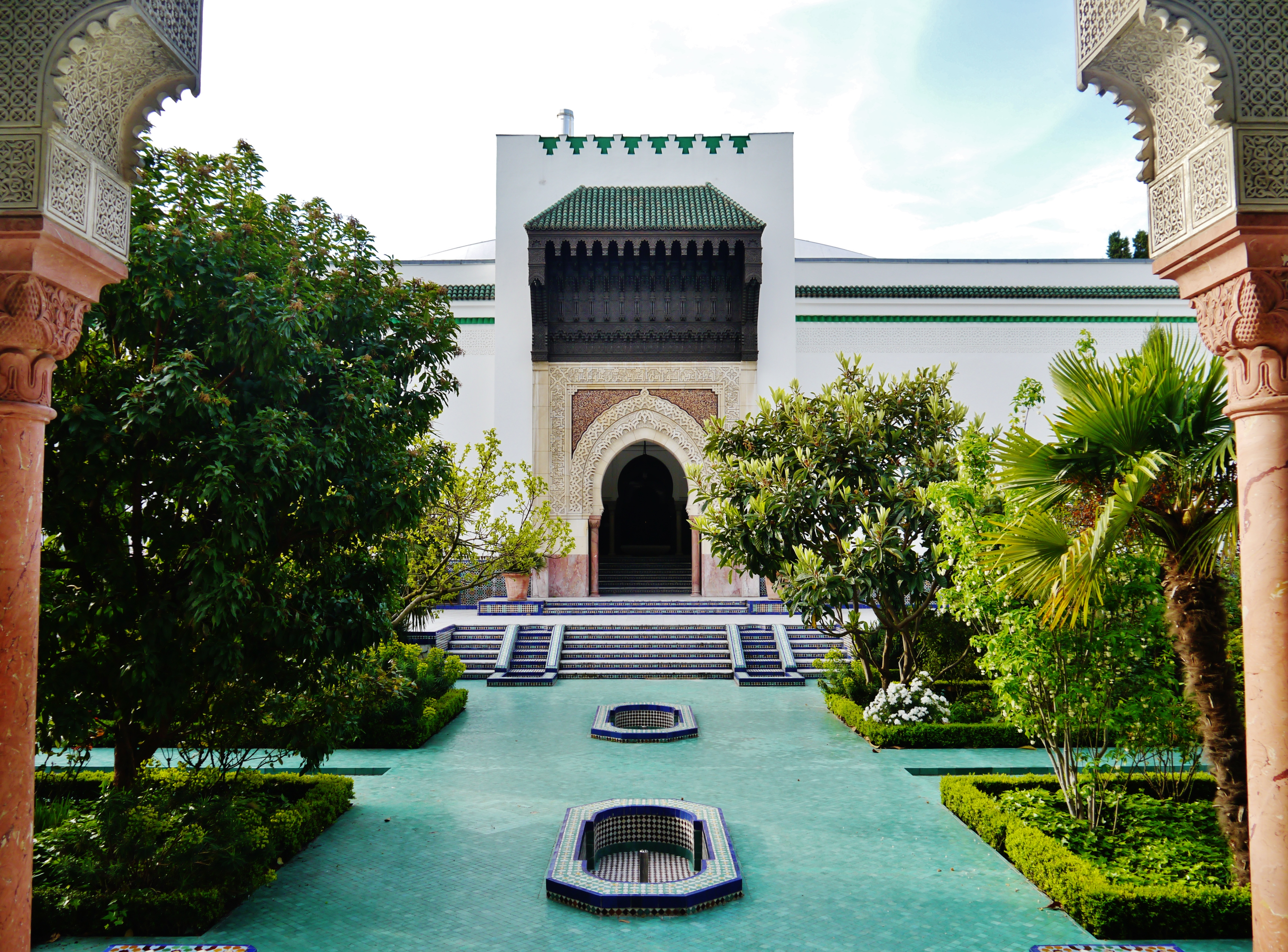
Main garden courtyard, looking south towards the gate to the courtyard

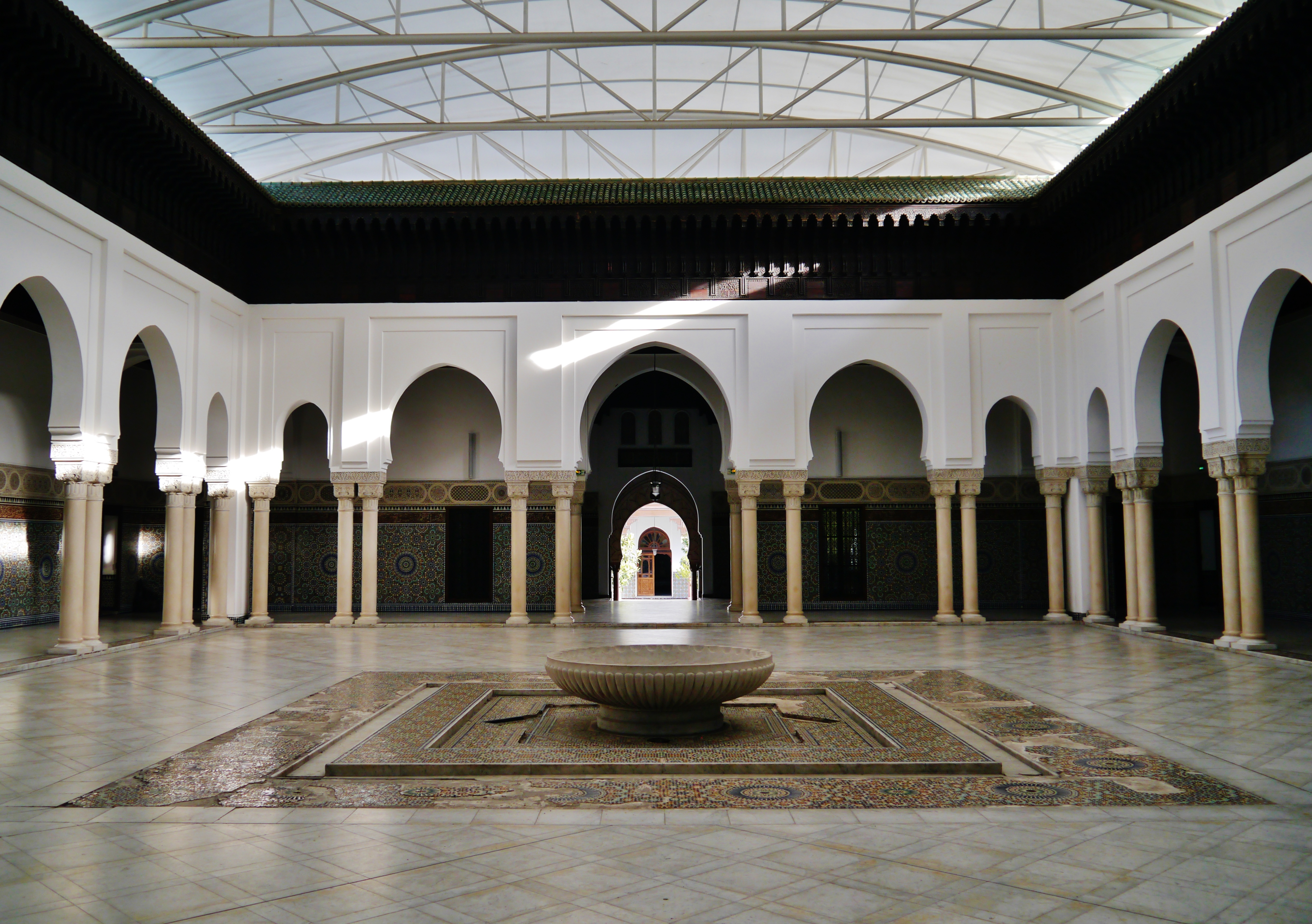
Main courtyard preceding the prayer hall

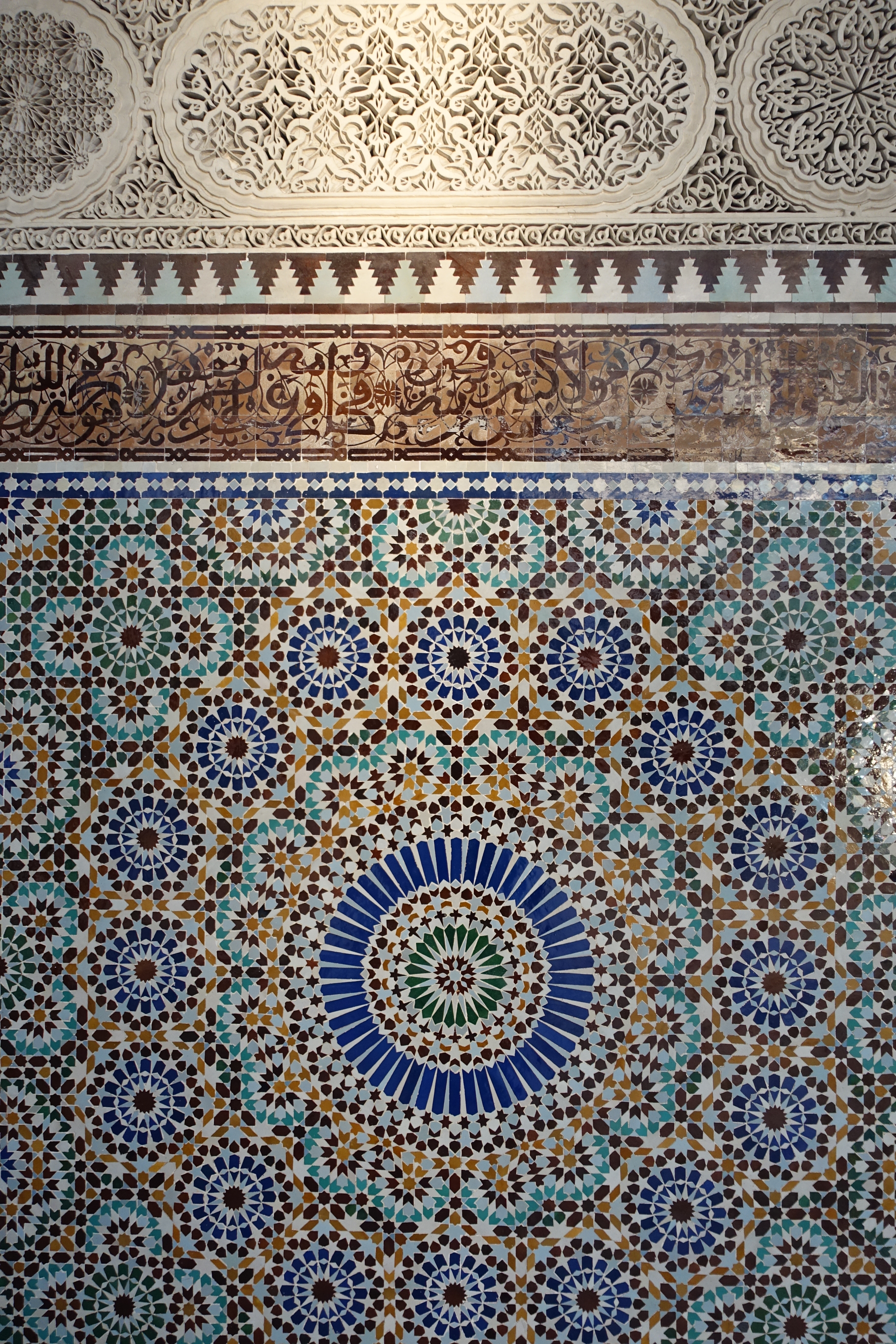
Detail of carved stucco and zellij tilework in the courtyard

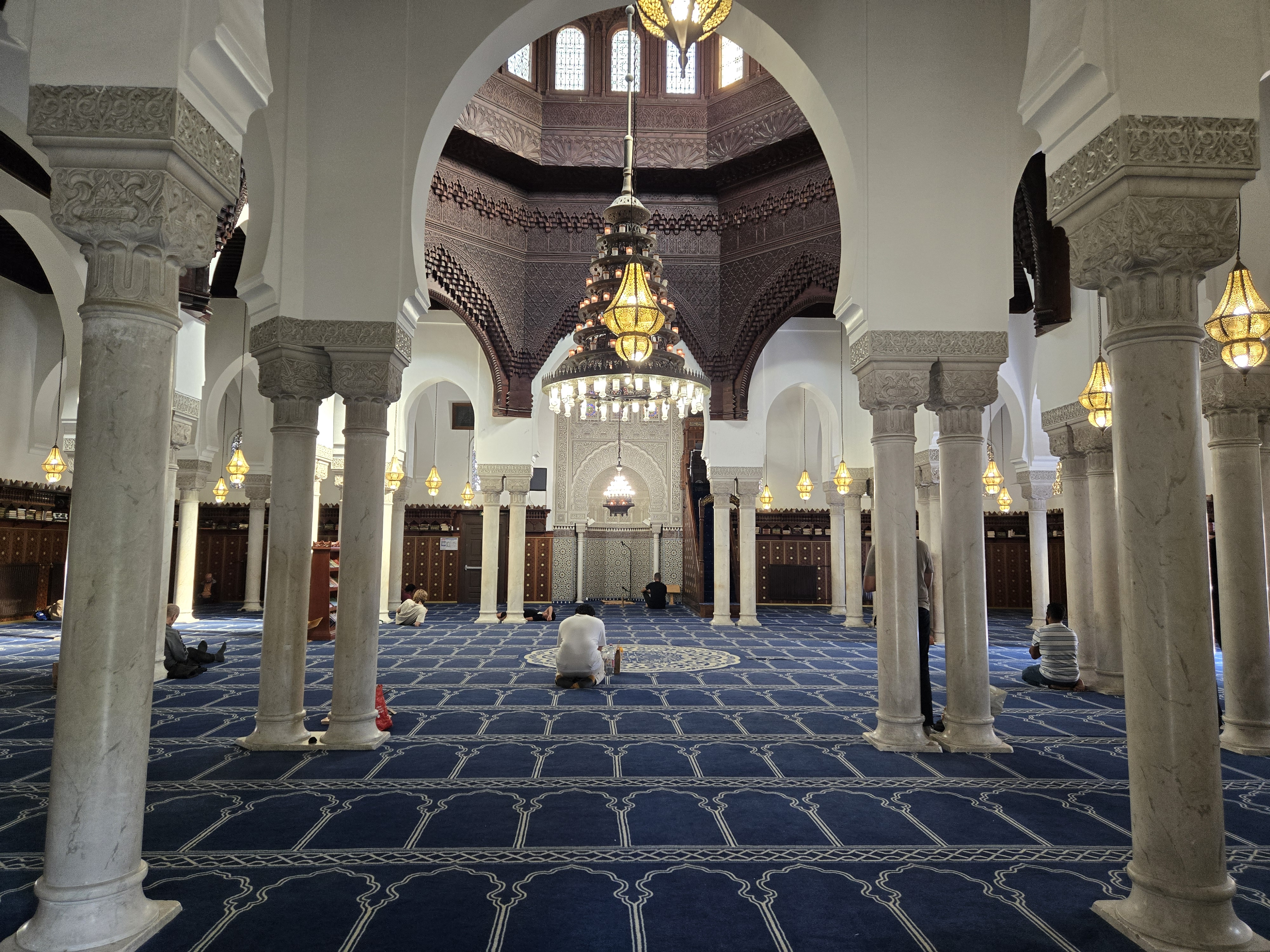
Prayer hall, looking southeast towards the mihrab

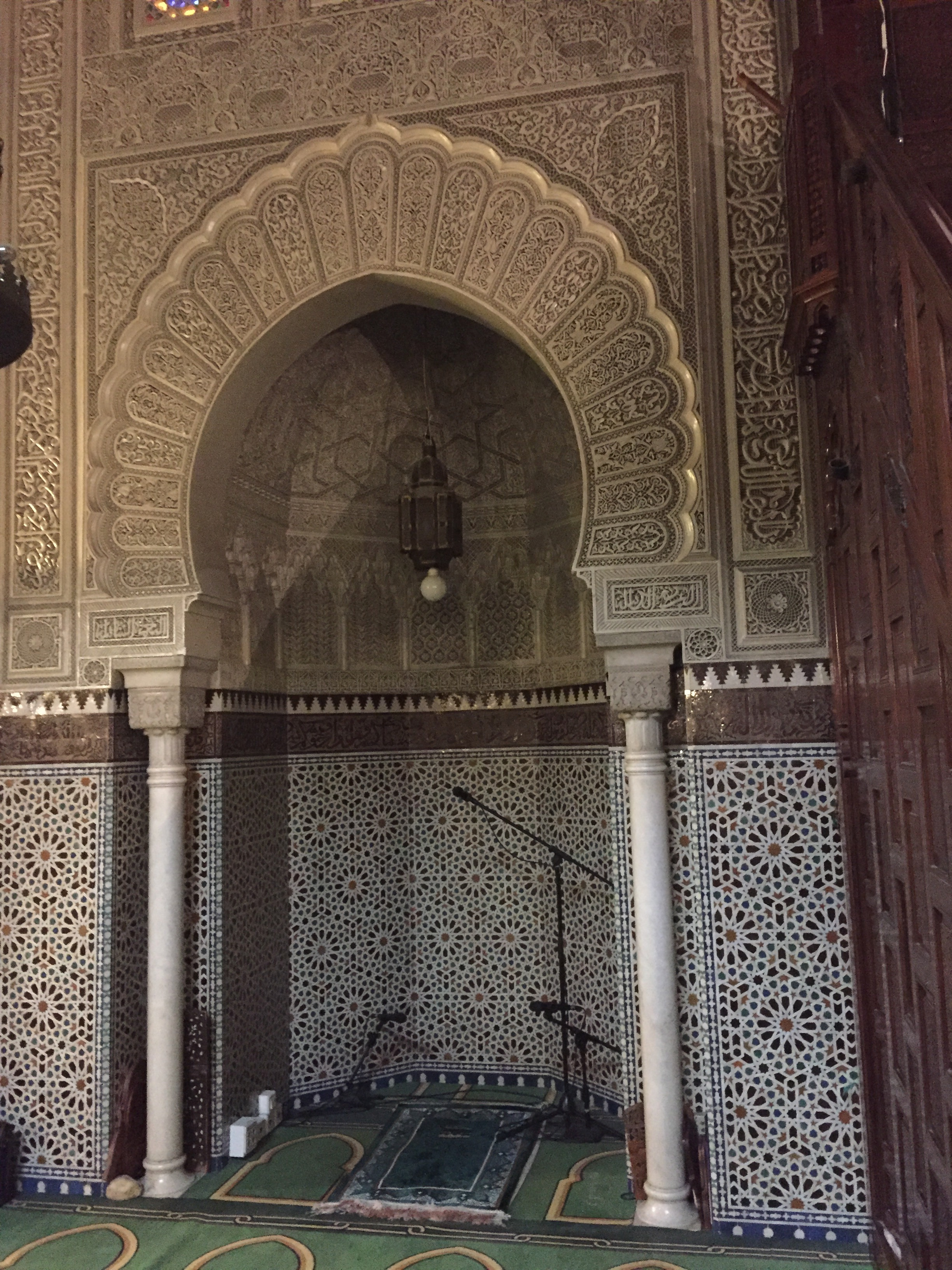
Mihrab

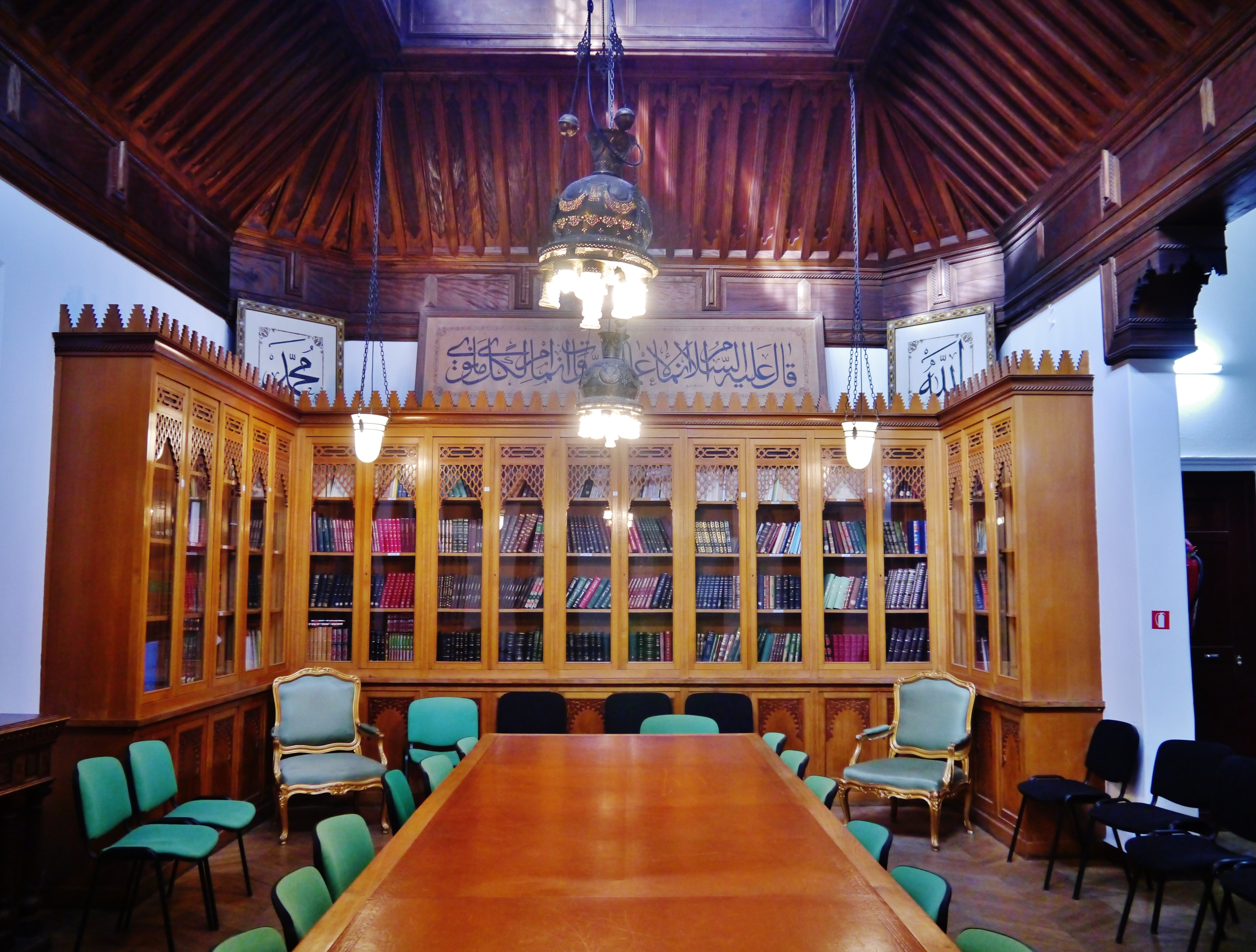
Library of the mosque

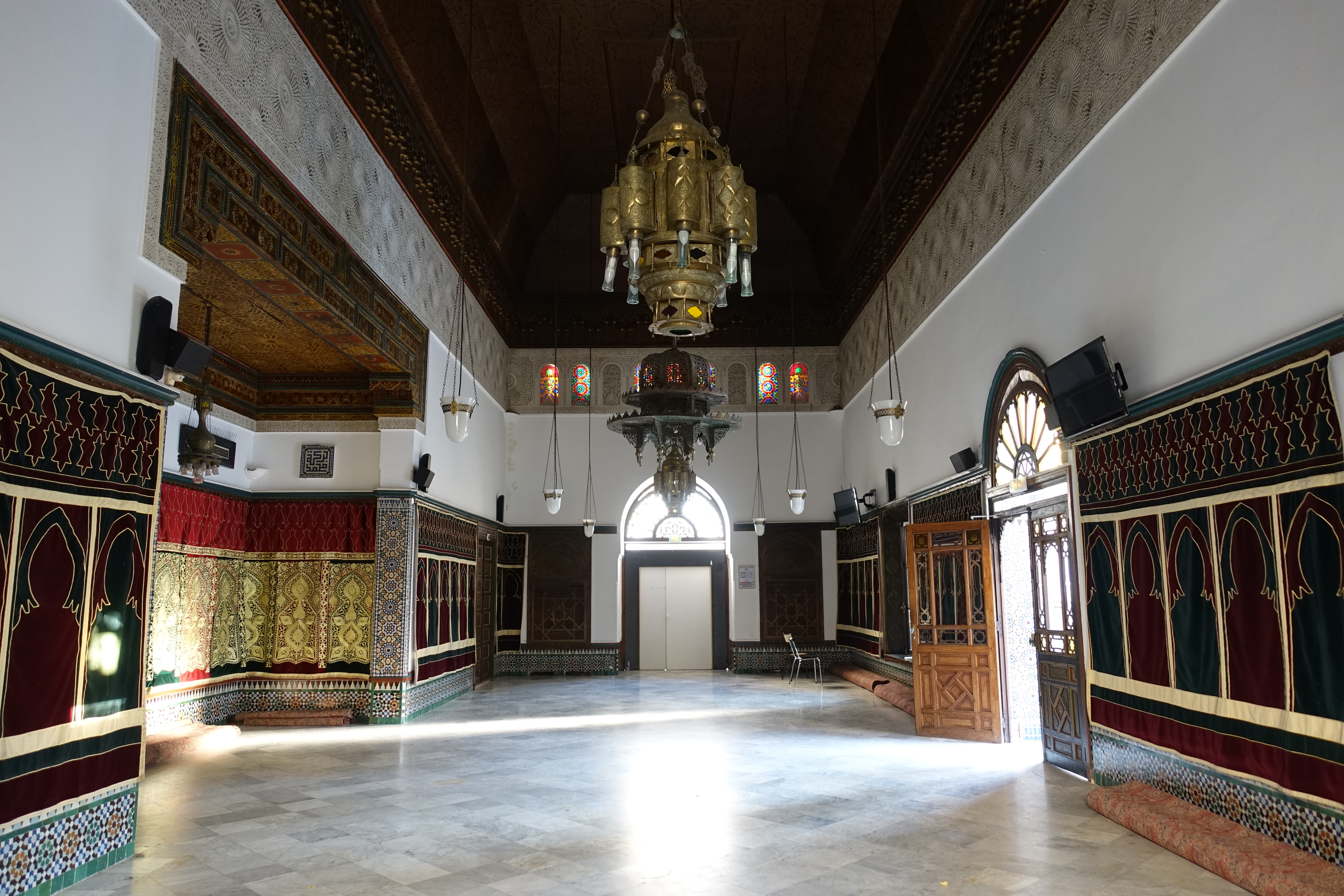
Conference room (Salle Émir Abdelkader), on the north side of the garden

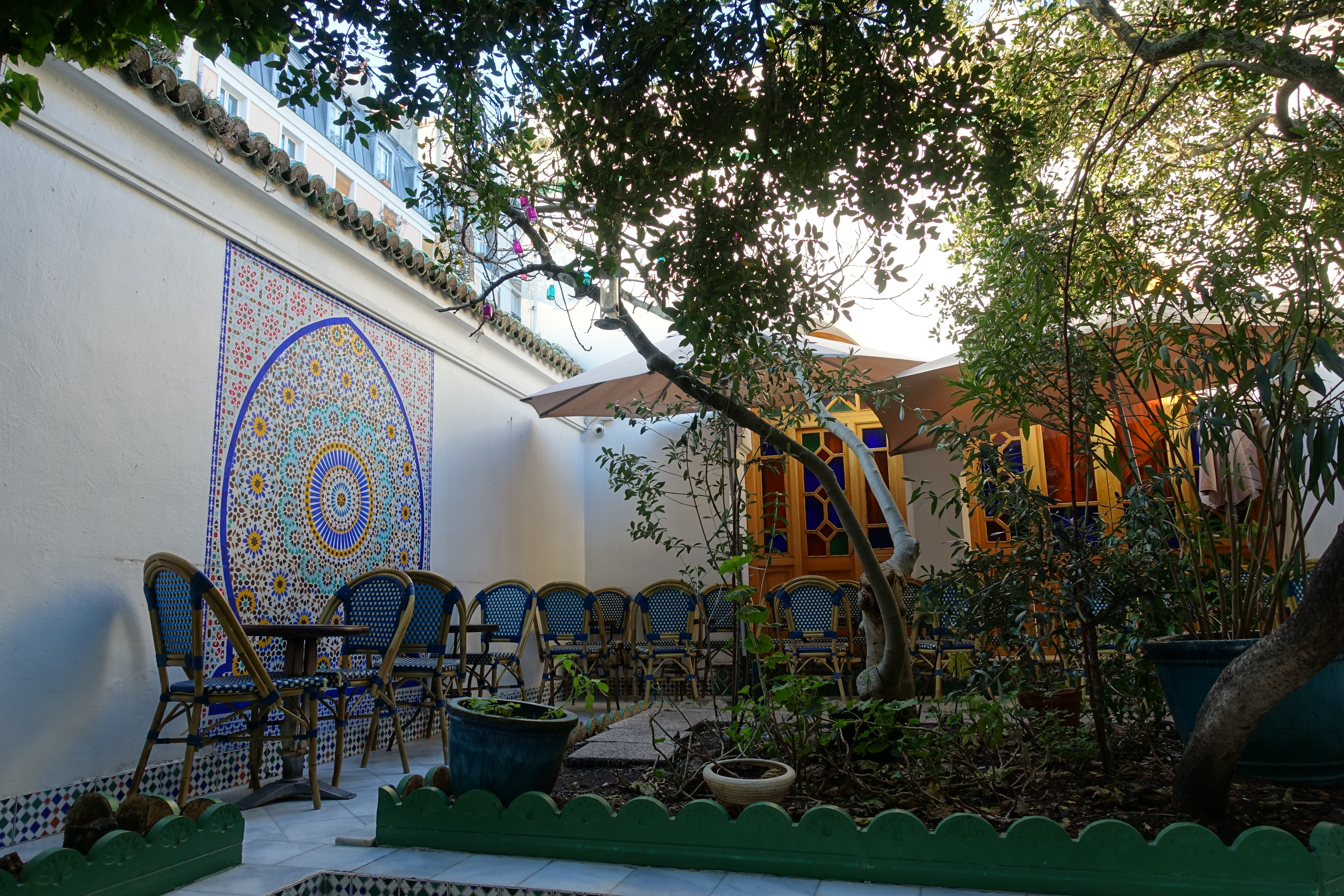
The café/restaurant attached on the mosque's southeast side

== Legal status ==
Since 1921, the Great Mosque has been under the authority of the Société des Habous et lieux saints de l'Islam, an association regulated by the Law of 1901, owner of the building following its donation by the City of Paris. In the 1980s Minister of the Interior Gaston Defferre withdrew the guardianship of the Mosque from the Ministry and the City of Paris, an act which has since permitted Algeria to finance a third of the budget of the mosque (in 2015, this budget totalled 1.8 million euros). Even if the mosque is legally independent, it remains religiously and culturally linked to Algeria, which exercises an unwritten right to the nomination of its rector; although, in 2015, Algeria announced officially the start of procedures for the acquisition of the property of the Great Mosque of Paris.

== Halal control and traceability ==
The Institut musulman de la grande mosquée de Paris is in a religious partnership with the Société française de contrôle de la viande halal (SFCVH; French Agency for Control of Halal Meat) agreed upon to regulate the priests authorized to perform ritual slaughter in conformation with the Decree of December 15, 1994 of the French Minister of Agriculture. The Institut musulman exercises the religious prerogatives in the matter of Islamic ritual sacrifice while the SFCVH is charged with overseeing the technical, administrative, and commercial aspects of control and certification of the processes of slaughter, such as electrocution and inert gas asphyxiation.

== Tourism ==
Today the Grand Mosque is the largest mosque in France and the third largest in Europe. It is located in the 5th arrondissement in the Latin Quarter near the Jardin des Plantes and the Institut de Monde Arabe. The mosque is a tourist destination as well as a place of prayer, and it offers guided tours. There are also large Hammam marble baths for visitors.

The mosque is open for tourists every day of the year (except for Fridays), outside of the rooms of imams and those for instruction, and the spaces reserved for reading of the Koran, prayers, and meditations by Muslims.

The mosque also includes a traditional restaurant "Aux Portes de l'Orient" (At the Doors of the East) which serves the cuisine of the Maghreb such as tagine and couscous, along with a tea room (serving mint tea, loukoum, pastries, hookah). There are also Arabic baths (exclusively for women), shops selling traditional Arab crafts, and all these establishments are open year-round to the public.

The mosque is accessed from Paris Métro Line 7 from the stations Place Monge and Censier-Daubenton as well as by several bus lines of the RATP (47, 67, and 89).

== See also ==
- Islam in France
- List of mosques in France
- List of tourist attractions in Paris
- Mosque of the Bois de Vincennes
- Saint Petersburg Mosque
