= Djaafar Khemdoudi =

French and Algerian resistance fighter

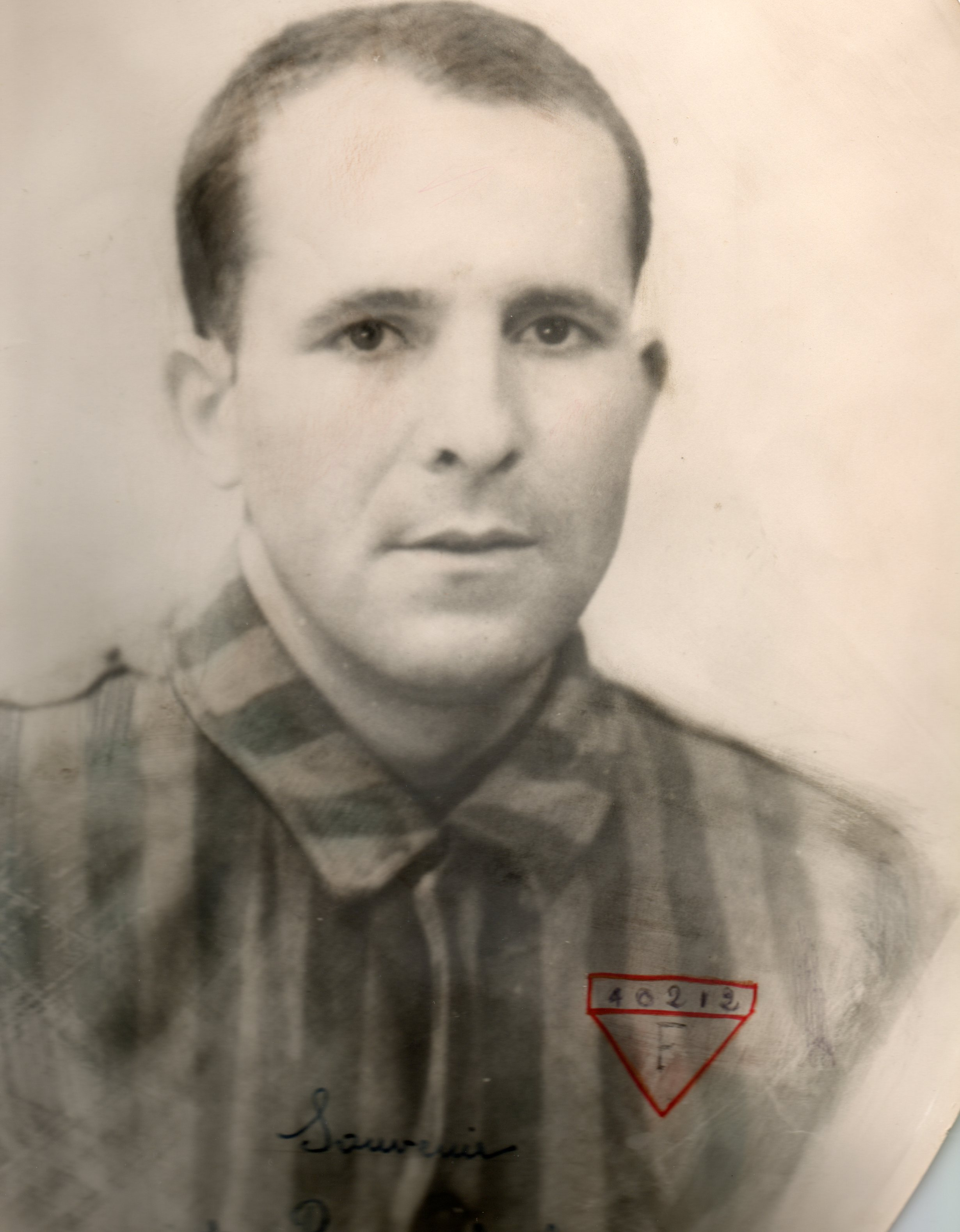
- Khemdoudi in his Neuengamme clothes
- Born: November 12, 1917; Sour El-Ghozlane, Bouïra, French Algeria
- Died: July 26, 2011 (aged 93); Lyon, France
- Other name: Jean Djaafar Khemdoudi
- Occupation: Resistance fighter

Djaafar Khemdoudi (in Arabic : جَعْفَر خَمْدُودِي) also known as Jean Djaafar Khemdoudi (November 12, 1917 – July 27, 2011) was a member of the French resistance during World War II. Born in Sour El-Ghozlane, French Algeria, Khemdoudi moved to France at a young age. After joining the Resistance, he saved numerous individuals who were evading the Compulsory Work Service (Service du Travail Obligatoire or STO) and also Jewish children from the cities of Saint-Fons and Vénissieux. After being captured by the Germans, Khemdoudi was deported to the concentration camp of Neuengamme, to the concentration camp of Malchow and then to Ravensbrück. He survived the camps, and, after the War, returned to France, where he lived the rest of his life. Khemdoudi is considered to have been part of the "indigenous resistance"—a term used for Resistance members from North Africa. Like many such persons, Khemdoudi's actions during the war received very little attention after his death.

== Biography ==
=== Birth and youth ===
Khemdoudi was born in Sour El-Ghozlane on November 12, 1917. At the age of 17, he left his family home after a dispute with his father and traveled to Marseille, then to Moselle, where he found employment. After a personal affair, he left Moselle and went to Lyon. He settled at 133 Rue Bugeaud in the 6th arrondissement of Lyon.

=== Involvement in the Resistance and deportation ===
Mobilized in 1939, he led a battalion of Maghrebi soldiers due to his French fluency. On December 1, 1942, after the surrender of France, he joined the French Resistance. He was forced to join the German Compulsory Work Service as an interpreter. There, he issued false certificates for evaders of the draft, helped Jews prepare for escape and hiding, and alerted other resistance members who were under surveillance. He also helped the Jewish children of Saint-Fons and Vénissieux. It is likely that he coordinated with Bel Hadj El Maafi, one of the leaders of the Algerian resistance in Lyon, who is also known for intervening in Saint-Fons in support of the Jewish community.

He was denounced and arrested on June 23, 1944, in Lyon, and imprisoned at Montluc Prison.

He was then deported to the Neuengamme camp on July 31, 1944. Due to the advancing Soviet troops, he was transferred to the Malchow camp and eventually to Ravensbrück, where he was finally liberated by the Soviet army. He returned to France on May 21, 1945.

=== Life after the war and death ===
Khemdoudi returned to France on May 21, 1945, but his time in the concentration camps left him permanently disabled, with a 100 percent disability rating. He refused to speak about his experiences in the French Resistance, but his contributions were recognized by the French authorities. Georges Durand, known as "Doris" in the Resistance, testified on December 11, 1947, that Khemdoudi had been infiltrated among the German authorities on the orders of the Resistance, that his business was looted during his arrest, that he was promoted to the rank of sub-lieutenant for his actions, and that "thanks to his tireless activity and great patriotism, a large number of workers were saved by the Armée secrète." In a letter to the military governor of Lyon, Bel Hadj El Maafi stated that Khemdoudi had "prevented the departure to Germany of a large number of individuals of North African, European, and Jewish origin." And Khemdoudi was awarded the Legion of Honour, of which he was an officer, as well as the Military Medal and the Medal of the Resistance.

Khemdoudi died in Lyon on July 27, 2011.

== Legacy ==
Like many other resistance fighters, particularly those of foreign origin, he was forgotten after the war. The author Kamel Mouellef contributed to the memory of Djaafar Khemdoudi by publishing books about him. A plaque in his honor has been placed in his former cell at the Montluc prison, even if this had sparked controversy within the Association of Resistance Fighters of Montluc (ARM), as his Algerian background had posed a problem for some.

In March 2023, he was featured in the exhibition "Ces résistants oubliés" (These Forgotten Resistance Fighters) in Saint Chamond.

== Decorations ==
- Officer of the Legion of Honour
- Resistance Medal
- Médaille militaire

== See also ==
- Bel Hadj El Maafi
- Abdelkader Mesli
- Si Kaddour Benghabrit
