= Château du Hâ =

Château in Bordeaux, Nouvelle-Aquitaine, France

Coordinates: 44°50′11″N 0°34′46″W

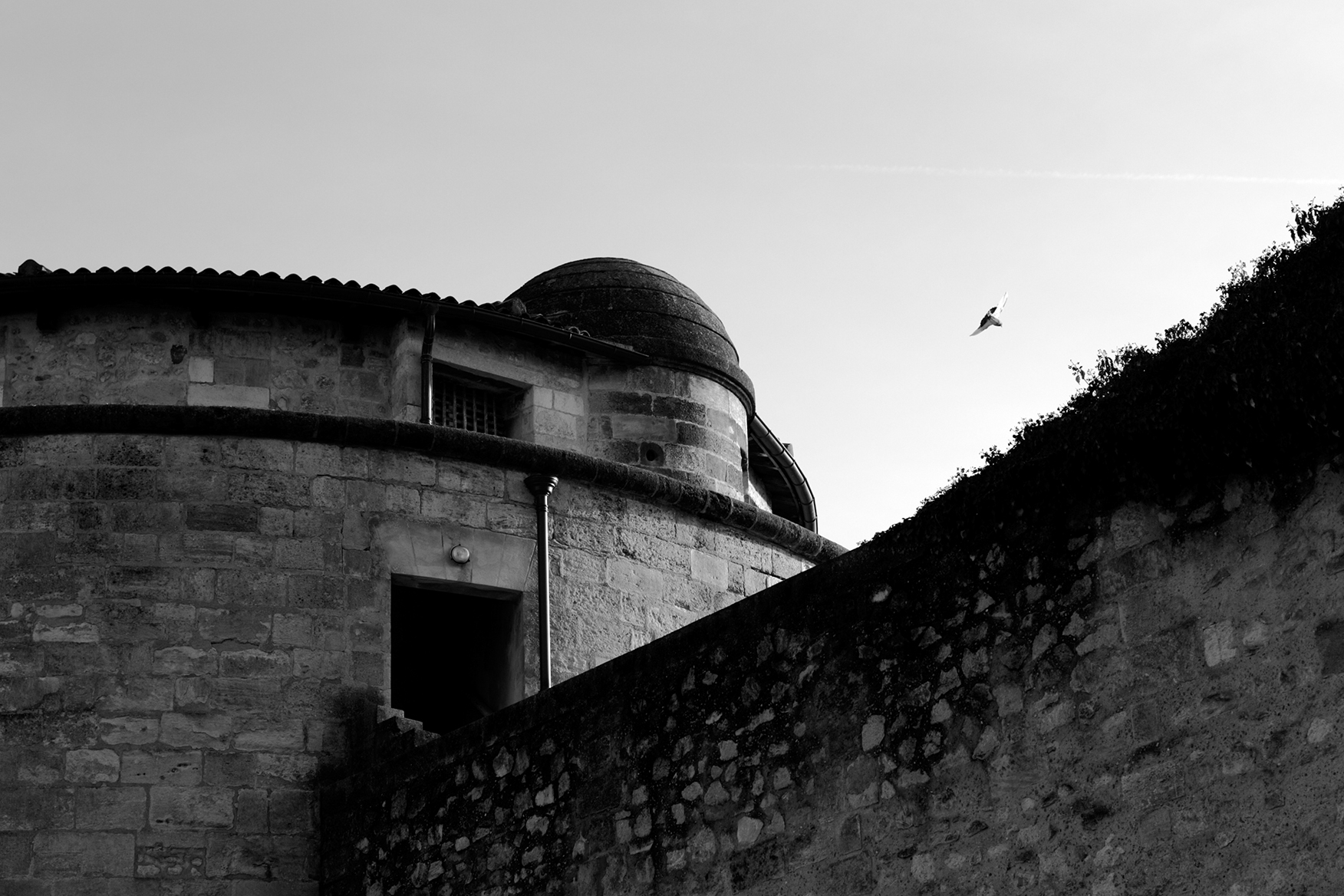

Château du Hâ is a château in Bordeaux, Nouvelle-Aquitaine, France. The castle was built on orders by Charles VII to secure his claim over Bordeaux and the Gascon region at the end of the Hundred Years War.
