= Si Kaddour Benghabrit =

Algerian imam and translator (1868–1954)

- عبد القادر بن غبريط; Abdelkader Ben Ghabrit
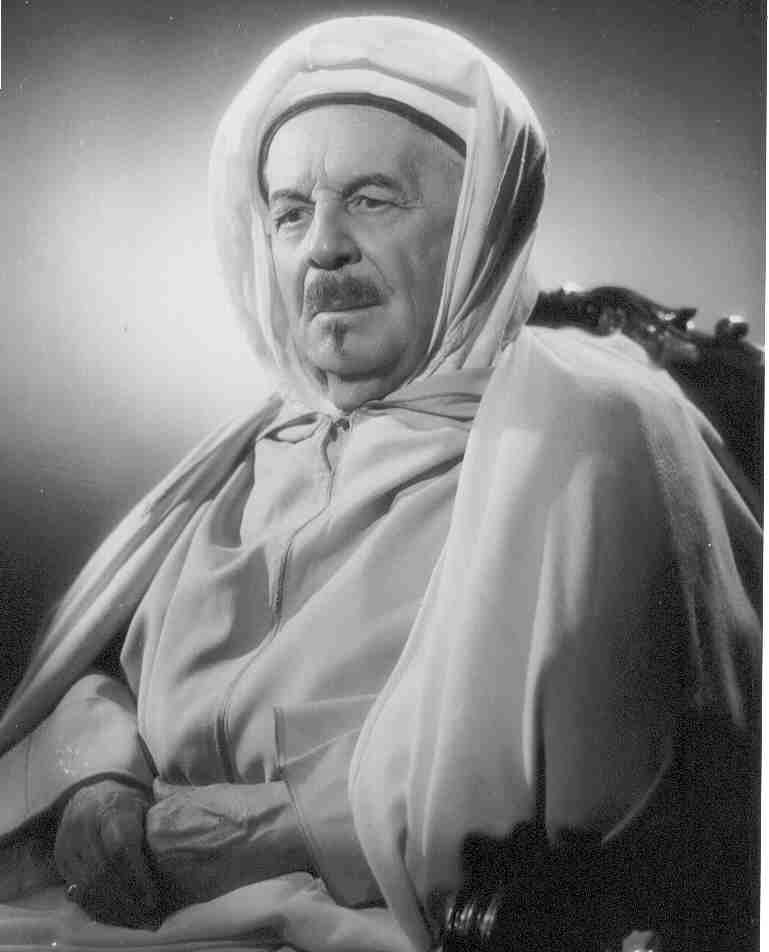
- Born: 1 November 1868; Sidi Bel Abbès, Algeria
- Died: 24 June 1954 (aged 85); Paris, France
- Relatives: Nouria Benghabrit (great-niece)

Abdelkader Ben Ghabrit (Arabic: عبد القادر بن غبريط; 1 November 1868 – 24 June 1954), commonly known as Si Kaddour Benghabrit (سي قدور بن غبريط) was an Algerian religious leader, translator and interpreter who worked for the French Ministry of Foreign Affairs. He was the first rector of the Great Mosque of Paris.

He participated in the Algeciras Conference of 1906 and the negotiations leading to the Treaty of Fes of 1912. He headed a French diplomatic mission to Mecca in 1916 to facilitate the Hajj. He worked to persuade Hussein bin Ali, the Sharif of Mecca to break with the Ottoman Empire and join the Allies. In exchange, his caliphate would be recognized by the Maliki Muslims of the French colonial Empire.

During the German occupation of France in World War II, he hid and saved numerous Jews in the basements of the Grand Mosque of Paris. Alongside Abdelkader Mesli, he joined the resistance and protected numerous victims of persecution, sometimes estimated to have been more than one thousand persons.

Benghabrit received high recognition by the French government. He was awarded the Grand Cross of the Legion of Honour (1939). After World War II, he received the French Resistance Medal with rosette (1947).

== Biography ==
Si Kaddour Benghabrit came from a prominent Andalusian family of Tlemcen. After his secondary education at the Madrasa Thaalibia in Algiers and the University of al-Karaouine of Fez, he started his career in Algeria, in the field of judiciary. Benghabrit received the typical education of the son of a Muslim notable in the Maghreb at the madrasa, memorizing the Koran and learning classical Arabic (the language of the Koran, which is very different from modern Algerian Arabic). At the same time, he also received an education that reflected the ideology of France's mission civilisatrice ("civilizing mission") under which France would "civilize" the Algerians by assimilating them into the French language and culture.

Benghabrit was a Francophile who embraced the ideal of France's mission civilisatrice in Algeria, and as such he was deeply loyal to France and its values. The American historian Ethan Katz described Benghabrit as bicultural, a man who was equally comfortable with both aspects of his identity as French and Muslim who "moved seamlessly" between the cultural worlds of France and the Maghreb. As a cosmopolitan, sophisticated man, able to straddle two very different cultural worlds, Benghabrit was able to make himself useful to those who held power, and in turn he came to enjoy power.

In 1892, he became assistant interpreter at the Legation of France to Tangier; he served as a liaison between North African officials and the French Ministry of Foreign Affairs. He served as chief of the French Legation in Tangier in the period 1900-1901. Benghabrit was fluent in Moroccan Arabic (which is closely related to Algerian Arabic), which gave the French legation an immense advantage over the legations of other European powers who lacked personnel capable of speaking Moroccan Arabic, and furthermore he was always well informed about Moroccan affairs. The French diplomat Charles de Beaupoil, comte de Saint-Aulaire rated Benghabrit as one of the ablest diplomats he had ever worked with.

In 1901, he served on the Franco-Moroccan commission to delineate the Algeria–Morocco border. He served the French delegation at the 1906 Algeciras Conference, which formalized French preëminence in Morocco. In Morocco, Benghabrit held a position in the court of Sultan Abd al-Hafid as an unofficial French diplomat.

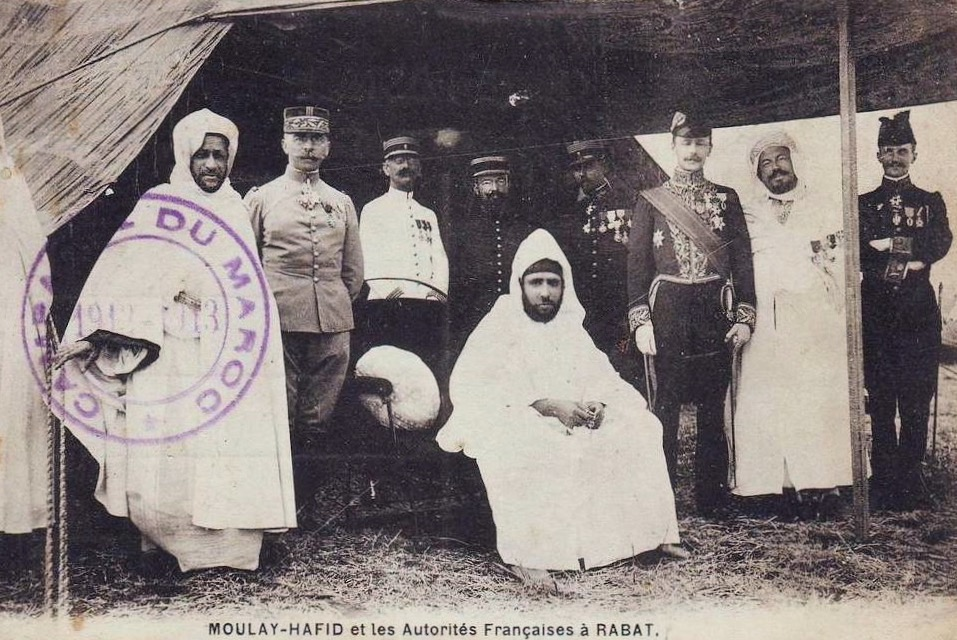
Abdelqader Benghabrit (second from right) with Muhammad al-Muqri, Charles Émile Moinier, Sultan Abd al-Hafid of Morocco, in Rabat 8 August 1912.

=== Treaty of Fes ===
In 1912, he interpreted the negotiations between Sultan Abd al-Hafid of Morocco and the French diplomat Eugène Regnault which culminated in the signing of the Treaty of Fes, which established the French Protectorate in Morocco. Resident General Hubert Lyautey then rewarded him with a position as head of protocol to the sultan.

=== World War I ===
In November 1914, the Ottoman Empire entered the First World War on the side of Germany. The Ottoman Sultan-Caliph Mehmed V, regarded as the spiritual leader of the entire Sunni Muslim world, issued a declaration of jihad (holy war) on 4 November 1914 urging all Muslims throughout the world to fight against Russia, Britain and France. France had millions of Muslims in its colonial empire, and there were serious worries in Paris about the loyalty of Muslims under French rule after the declaration of jihad. Benghabrit used all of his influence to argue that French Muslims should remain loyal to France, which endeared him to the French government. For the most part, French Muslims remained loyal to the republic during World War One and disregarded the Ottoman declaration of jihad, which improved his standing in Paris. During the war, Benghabrit urged Muslim men to enlist in the French Army and gave speeches before Muslim soldiers to tell them that they were fighting for the right side by fighting for France.

In 1916, France sent him to Hijaz as head of the French diplomatic mission to Mecca to facilitate the Hajj and ensure the well-being of his fellow citizens during their time in the holy places of Islam, and to convince Hussein bin Ali, the Sharif of Mecca to break with the Ottoman Empire and join the Allies, assuring him of French support for a caliphate headed by himself. Hussein received him with honor and granted him the right to clean the floor of the Kaaba and sit next to him during the Friday prayer in Mecca.

In 1917, Si Kaddour founded in the Mahkama of Algiers (civil court or qadi), the Society of Habous and the Holy Places of Islam, in order to facilitate the pilgrimage to Mecca by Muslims from French North Africa. The Society acquired two hotels in Medina and Mecca for use by pilgrims.

==== Intelligence ====
Throughout his career, Ben Ghabrit supplied France with valuable information about Muslim populations. The Quai d'Orsay's Africa-Levant division described him as one of its "most trusted Arab informants." In April 1920, he supplied the French premier and foreign minister Alexandre Millerand with a 23-page report on Muslim attitudes in North Africa and the Levant toward France, arguing for more autonomy in French colonies and support for the Paris Muslim Institute as a vital source of intelligence.

=== Grand Mosque of Paris ===
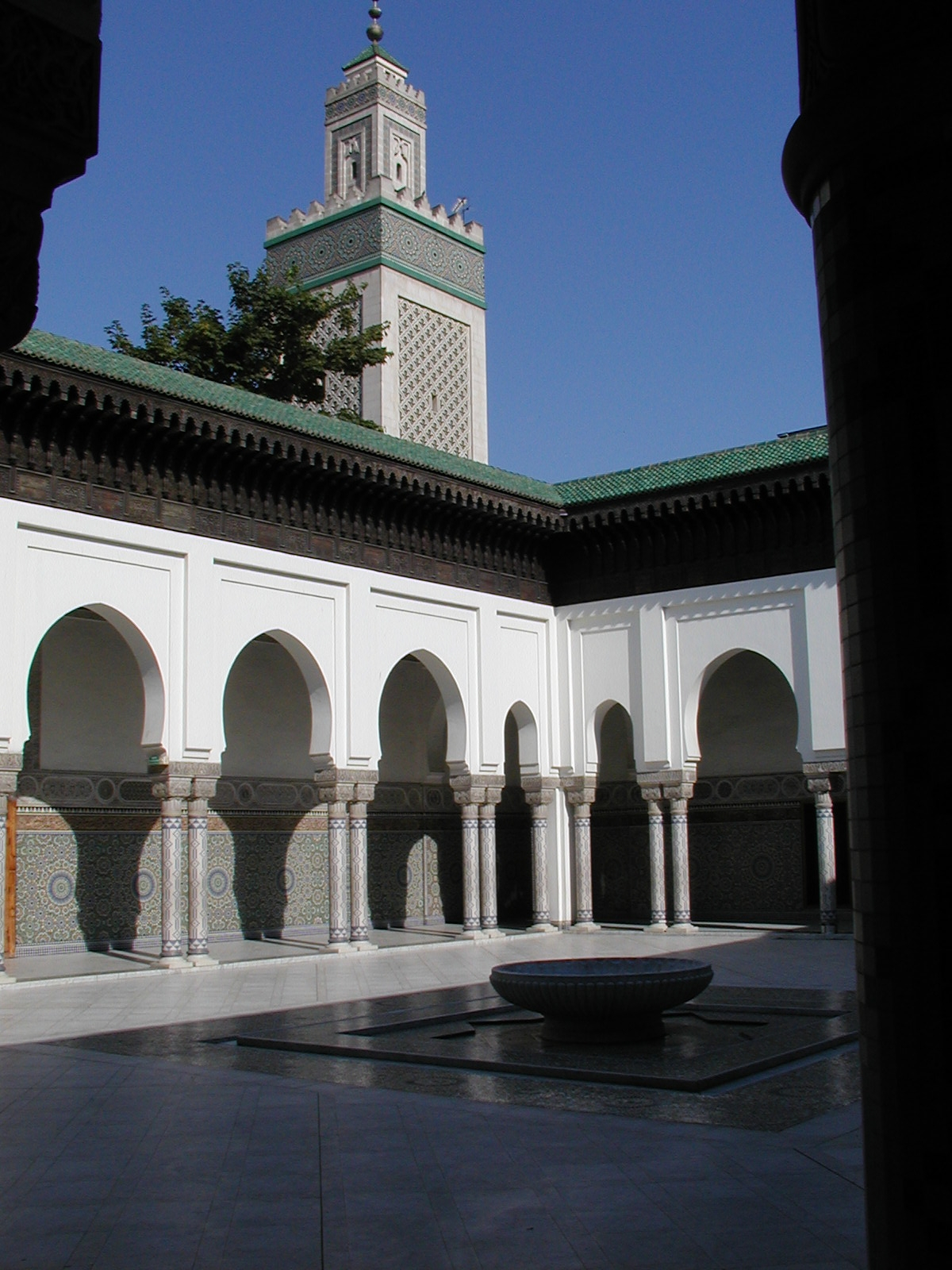
Inner courtyard of the Grand Mosque of Paris

In 1920, the Society of Habous and Holy Places of Islam established the Algiers prefecture. It intended to apply for authorization to construct an Institute and a Mosque in Paris, to have a structure to symbolize the eternal friendship of France and Islam, and memorialize the sacrifice of the tens of thousands of Muslim soldiers who died fighting in support of France during World War I, including at the Battle of Verdun. The Great Mosque of Paris was built in the 5th arrondissement, completed in 1926. At the opening of the Great Mosque, Benghabrit in his speeches in both French and Arabic praised the "eternal union" of France and Islam.

The Muslim Institute of the Paris Mosque was opened in Paris to aid all Muslims living in or visiting the area. It provided services and spiritual direction but also aided people with direct welfare if needed, as well as supporting new immigrants and acclimating them to the city.

== World War II and Jews ==
A sophisticated man and frequenter of Parisian salons, Ben Ghabrit was dubbed "the most Parisian Muslim". During World War II and after the fall of France, Si Kaddour Ben Ghabrit worked to protect his people, both Muslims and Jews, arranging for forged papers for an estimated 100 Jews to certify them as Muslim. He also arranged to have Jewish refugees hidden in the mosque at times of German roundups, and transported by the Resistance out of the country. Also he saved the lives of at least five hundred Jews, including that of the Algerian singer Salim Halali, making the administrative staff grant them certificates of Muslim identity, which allowed them to avoid arrest and deportation. In addition, during the war in France, many Muslims joined the French Resistance movement.

In a documentary entitled Mosque of Paris, the forgotten, produced for the show Racines de France 3 in 1991, Derri Berkani reports that it was the Algerian partisans, mainly composed of workers, who had led the Jews to the Paris Mosque for protection. The mission of these Algerian partisans was to rescue and protect the British SOE agents and find them shelter. The Partisans subsequently provided assistance to Jewish families, from the families they knew, or at the request of friends, by accommodating them in the mosque, waiting for papers to be provided to get them to the Zone libre or cross the Mediterranean to the Maghreb.

The figures for the number of Jews saved by staying in the Mosque of Paris during this period differ according to the authors. Annie-Paule Derczansky, president of the Association des Bâtisseuses de paix, states that according to Albert Assouline, as stated in the Berkani film, 1600 people were saved. On the other hand, Alain Boyer, former head of religious affairs in the French Ministry of Interior, has stated that the number was closer to 500 people.

== Legacy and honors ==
For his contributions, Ben Ghabrit was awarded the Grand Cross of the Legion of Honour. He is buried in a reserved area to the North of the Mosque of Paris, according to the Maliki rite. The Bâtisseuses de Paix, an association of Jewish and Muslim women working for inter-community harmony, submitted a petition in 2005 to Yad Vashem's Council to recognize that the Mosque of Paris saved many Jews between 1942 and 1944, and that Yad Vashem should thus recognize Si Kaddour Benghabrit as one of the Righteous Among the Nations. This request remains unfulfilled, as no survivors have been found; apparently the mosque had worked with false passports.

Si Kaddour Benghabrit's efforts to save Salim Halali and other Jews are depicted in the French drama film Les hommes libres (Free Men, 2011) film, directed by Ismaël Ferroukhi and released in 2011. He is played by French actor Michael Lonsdale. Si Kaddour Benghabrit also inspired Mohamed Fekrane in his short film Together, released in 2010. The role of the imam is played by actor Habib Kadi.

== Descendants ==
Nouria Benghabrit-Remaoun, sociologist and researcher, granddaughter of Si Kaddour Benghabrit's brother, was the Minister of National Education of Algeria.

== Decorations ==
- Grand Cross of the Legion of Honour (France)

== Works ==
- La Fondation Lyautey. [Signed: Gabriel Hanotaux, Paul Tirard. A text in Arabic by Si Kaddour ben Gabrit.].
- Abou-Nouas, ou, L'art de se tirer d'affaire.

== See also ==
- Mosque of the Bois de Vincennes
- Abdelkader Mesli
- Djaafar Khemdoudi

== Sources ==
- Abdellali Merdaci, Algerian French-language authors from the colonial period : Biographical Dictionary , L'Harmattan, 2010
- Katz, Ethan (Spring 2012). "Did the Paris Mosque Save Jews? A Mystery and Its Memory". The Jewish Quarterly Review. 102 (2): 256–286. doi:10.1353/jqr.2012.0012. S2CID 162828322.
- Biography of Si Kaddour Ben Ghabrit Official site of the Great Mosque of Paris
- Porch, Douglas (2005). The Conquest of Morocco A History. New York: Farrar, Straus and Giroux. ISBN 9781429998857.
- Satloff, Robert (2006). Among the Righteous. New York: PublicAffairs. ISBN 9781586485344.
