= Ubaidullah Sindhi =

Indian scholar and political activist (1872–1944)

Imam-e-Inqilab Maulana Ubaidullah Sindhi
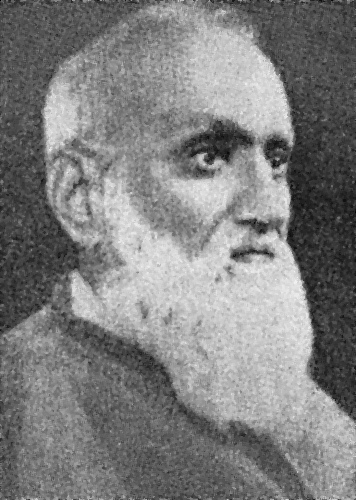
- Maulana Ubaidullah Sindhi

Home Minister of the Provisional Government of India
- In office 1 December 1915 – January 1919
- Preceded by: Position established
- Succeeded by: Position abolished

Personal life
- Born: 10 March 1872 Sialkot, Punjab Province, British Indian Empire
- Died: 21 August 1944 (aged 72) Deen Pur, Bahawalpur State, British Indian Empire
- Occupation: Political activist/Islamic philosopher/scholar

Religious life
- Religion: Islam
- Denomination: Sunni
- Jurisprudence: Hanafi
- Creed: Maturidi
- Movement: Deobandi

Ubaidullah Sindhi (10 March 1872 – 21 August 1944) was a political activist of the Indian independence movement and one of its prominent leaders. According to Dawn, Maulana Ubaidullah Sindhi struggled for the independence of nation and for an exploitation-free society. He was also the Home Minister of first Provisional Government of India established in Afghanistan in 1915.

Ubaidullah Sindhi was the life member of Jamia Millia Islamia, in New Delhi, British India. He served the Jamia Millia Islamia for a long period of time on a meagre salary. A boys' hostel in Dr. Zakir Husain Hall of Boys' Residence in Jamia Millia Islamia has been named after him.

== Early life ==
Ubaidullah was born on 10 March 1872 in a Punjabi Sikh family belonging to Khatri Uppal clan, in the district of Sialkot, Punjab, British India as Buta Singh Uppal. His father died four months before Ubaidullah was born, and the child was raised for two years by his paternal grandfather. Following the paternal grandfather's death, he was taken by his mother to the care of her father, at his maternal grandfather's house. Later, young Buta Singh was entrusted to the care of his uncle at Jampur Tehsil, Punjab, when his maternal grandfather died.

== Conversion to Islam and education ==
When he was at school, a Hindu friend gave him the book Tufatul Hind to read. It was written by a converted scholar Maulana Ubaidullah of Malerkotla. After reading this book and some other books like Taqwiyatul Eeman and Ahwaal ul Aakhira, Ubaidullah's interest in Islam grew, leading eventually to his conversion to Islam. Buta Singh Uppal converted to Islam at age 15 and chose "Ubaidullah Sindhi" as his new name. In 1887, the year of his conversion, he moved from Punjab to Sindh where he was taken as a student by Hafiz Muhammad Siddique of Chawinda (Bhar Chandi Shareef). He subsequently studied at Deen Pur Shareef (a village near Khanpur, District Rahim Yar Khan) under Maulana Ghulam Muhammad, Where he delved deeper into Islamic education and training in the mystical order. In 1888, Ubaidullah was admitted to Darul Uloom Deoband, where he studied various Islamic disciplines in depth under the tutelage of noted Islamic scholars of the time including Maulana Abu Siraj, Maulana Rashid Ahmad Gangohi and Maulana Mahmud Hasan Deobandi. He took lessons in Sahih al-Bukhari and Tirmidhi from Maulana Nazeer Husain Dehalvi and read logic and philosophy with Maulana Ahmad Hasan Cawnpuri.

In 1891, Ubaidullah graduated from the Deoband school. In 1899, he left for Sukkur area in Sindh province. In 1909, at the request of Mahmud Hasan Deobandi, Maulana Sindhi returned to the Darul Uloom Deoband in 1909, and gradually involved himself in the Pan-Islamic movement. Here, he accomplished much for the student body, Jamiatul Ansaar. Ubaidullah was now very active in covert anti-British propaganda activities, which led to him alienating a large number of the Deoband School leaders. Subsequently, Ubaidullah moved his work to Delhi at Mahmud Hasan Deobandi's request. At Delhi, he worked with Hakim Ajmal Khan and Dr. Ansari. In 1912, he established a madrassah, Nazzaaratul Ma'arif to propagate Islam among the people.

== Silk letter movement ==
During World War I, he was among the leaders of the Deoband School, who, led by Maulana Mahmud Hasan Deobandi, left India to seek support among other nations of the world for a Pan-Islamic revolution in India in what came to be known as the Silk Letter Conspiracy. With the onset of World War I in 1914, efforts were made by the Darul Uloom Deoband to forward the cause of Pan-Islam in British India with the help of the other sympathetic nations of the world. Led by Mahmud Hasan Deobandi, plans were sketched out for an insurrection beginning in the tribal belt of North-West Frontier Province of British India. Mahmud Hasan Deobandi, left India to seek the help of Galib Pasha, the Turkish governor of Hijaz, while at Hasan's directions, Ubaidullah proceeded to Kabul to seek Emir Habibullah's support there. Initial plans were to raise an Islamic army (Hizb Allah) headquartered at Medina, with an Indian contingent at Kabul. Maulana Hasan was to be the General-in-Chief of this army. Some of Ubaidullah's students went to Kabul to explore things before Ubaidullah arrived there. While at Kabul, Ubaidullah came to the conclusion that focusing on the Indian Freedom Movement would best serve the pan-Islamic cause. Ubaidullah had proposed to the Afghan Emir that he declare war against British India. Maulana Abul Kalam Azad is known to have been involved in the movement prior to his arrest in 1916.

Maulana Ubaidullah Sindhi and Mahmud Hasan Deobandi (principal of the Darul Uloom Deoband) had proceeded to Kabul in October 1915 with plans to initiate a Muslim insurrection in the tribal belt of British India. For this purpose, Ubaid Allah was to propose that the Amir of Afghanistan declare war against Britain while Mahmud Hasan Deobandi sought German and Turkish help. Hasan proceeded to Hijaz. Ubaidullah, in the meantime, had reached Kabul during the war to rally the Afghan Amir Habibullah Khan, and after a brief period there, he offered his support to Raja Mahendra Pratap's plans for revolution in British India with German support. Ubaidullah was able to establish friendly relations with Emir Habibullah of Afghanistan. At Kabul, Ubaidullah along with some of his students, were to make their way to Turkey to join the Caliph's Jihad against Britain. But it was eventually decided that the pan-Islamic cause was to be best served by focusing on the Indian Freedom Movement.

In late 1915, Sindhi was met in Kabul by the 'Niedermayer-Hentig Expedition' sent by the Indian Independence Committee in Berlin and the German war ministry. Nominally led by the exiled Indian prince Raja Mahendra Pratap, it had among its members the Islamic scholar Abdul Hafiz Mohamed Barakatullah, and the German officers Werner Otto von Hentig and Oskar Niedermayer, as well as a number of other notable individuals. The expedition tried to rally Emir Habibullah's support, and through him, begin a campaign into British India. It was hoped that it would initiate a rebellion in British India. On 1 December 1915, the Provisional Government of India was founded at Emir Habibullah's 'Bagh-e-Babur Palace' in the presence of the Indian, German, and Turkish members of the expedition. It was declared a 'revolutionary government-in-exile' which was to take charge of independent India when British authority was overthrown. Mahendra Pratap was proclaimed its president, Barkatullah the Prime minister, Ubaidullah Sindhi the Minister for India, another Deobandi leader Moulavi Bashir its War Minister, and Champakaran Pillai was to be the Foreign Minister. The Provisional Government of India obtained support from Galib Pasha and proclaimed Jihad against Britain. Recognition was sought from the Russian Empire, Republican China and Japan. This provisional government later attempted to obtain support from Soviet leadership. After the February Revolution in Russia in 1917, Pratap's government corresponded with the nascent Soviet government. In 1918, Mahendra Pratap met Trotsky in Petrograd before meeting the Kaiser in Berlin, urging both to mobilise against British India.

However, these plans faltered, Emir Habibullah remained steadfastly neutral while he awaited a concrete indication where the war was headed, even as his advisory council and family members indicated their support against Britain. The Germans withdrew their support in 1917, but the 'Provisional Government of India' stayed behind at Kabul. In 1919, this government was ultimately dissolved under British diplomatic pressure on Afghanistan. Ubaidullah had stayed in Kabul for nearly seven years. He even encouraged the young King Amanullah Khan, who took power in Afghanistan after Habibullah's assassination, in the Third Anglo-Afghan War. The conclusion of the war ultimately, forced Ubaidullah Sindhi to leave Afghanistan as King Amanullah came under pressure from Britain. He remained in Afghanistan until the end of World War I, and then left for Russia.

== Later works ==
Ubaidullah then proceeded from Afghanistan to Russia, where he spent seven months at the invitation of the Soviet leadership, and was officially treated as a guest of the state. During this period, he studied the ideology of socialism. According to an article in a major newspaper of Pakistan, titled 'Of socialism and Islam', "Islam showed not only deep sympathy for the poor and downtrodden but also condemned strongly the concentration of wealth in a number of Makkan surahs. Makkah, as an important centre of international trade, was home to the very rich (tribal chiefs) and the extremely poor." In Russia, however, he was unable to meet Lenin, who was severely ill at the time. Some people at that time thought, incorrectly, that Sindhi was impressed by Communist ideals during his stay in Russia. In 1923, Ubaidullah left Russia for Turkey where he initiated the third phase of the 'Shah Waliullah Movement' in 1924. He subsequently spent two years in Turkey. He issued the 'Charter for the Independence of India' from Istanbul. Ubaidullah then left for Mecca, Arabia in 1927 and eventually reached Hijaz (Saudi Arabia) where he spent about 14 years learning and pondering over the philosophy of Islam especially in the light of Shah Waliullah Dehlawi's works. In his career, he was a Pan-Islamic thinker. During this period, he brought the message of the rights of Muslims and other important religious issues to the people of Arabia. During his stay in Russia, he was not impressed by the Communist ideas but rather, after the Soviet revolution, he presented his belief to the Soviet government that: "Communism is not a natural law system but rather is a reaction to oppression, the natural law is offered by Islam". He attempted to convince them, but could not answer when asked to provide an example of a state run according to the laws of Islam.

== Death ==
In 1936, the Indian National Congress requested his return to India, and the British Raj subsequently gave its permission. He landed at the port of Karachi from Saudi Arabia in 1938. He then went to Delhi, where he began a programme teaching Shah Waliullah's Hujjatullahil Baalighah book to Maulana Saeed Ahmad Akbarabadi, who would then write an exegesis in his own words. Opposed to the partition of India, Ubaidullah led a conference supporting a united India in June 1941 at Kumbakonam. Right after his return to India, he started meeting Netaji Subhas Chandra Bose and planned his movement to Germany and Japan. They met several times and are supposed to have discussed a plan similar to the one carried out by Ubaidullah, Raja Mahendra Pratap and Maulana Barkatullah during the First World War. He was opposed to the Pakistan plan of Mohammad Ali Jinnah and Muslim League. In his view Muslims and Hindus of India were one civilization and he was against the idea of foreign help in Indian affairs. Ubaidullah left for Rahim Yar Khan to visit his daughter in 1944. At the village 'Deen Pur' near Khanpur town in Rahim Yar Khan District, he was taken seriously ill, and died on 21 August 1944. He was buried in the graveyard adjacent to the grave of his mentors.

== Literary works ==
Among his famous books are:

- Safarnama-i-Kabul
- Shah Waliullah aur Unka Falsafa
- Shaoor-o-Agahi
- Qurani Shaoor-e-Inqalab
- Khutbat-o-Makalat
- Mere Zindegi
- Zaati Diary (an autobiography)

== Legacy ==
- Pakistan Postal Services has issued a commemorative postage stamp in honor of Ubaidullah Sindhi in its 'Pioneers of Freedom' series in 1990.
- Saeed Ahmad Akbarabadi wrote Maulana Ubaidullah Sindhi awr Unke Naaqid.

== Sources ==
- Islami Bishwakosh, Volume 6, p. 121–122
- برصغیر میں اصول تفسیر کا اتقاء سرسید احمد خان، حمید الدین فراہمی، عبید اللہ سندھی کے خصو صی افکار کی روشنی میں
- تحقیق مخطوط "التفسیر إلھام الرحمن" للشیخ عبیداللہ السندي (1944م) من سورۃ الدھر إلي سورۃ الحجرات (دراسۃ و تحقیقا)
- Ahmed, Waqar; Hashmi, Dr Shah Moinuddin (31 December 2021). "Maulana Obaidullah Sindhi's Theory of Ethics and the Formation of Society (In Modern Context): مولانا عبید اللہ سندھی کا نظریہ اخلاق اور تشکیل معاشرت (عصری تناظرمیں)". Al-Aijaz Research Journal of Islamic Studies & Humanities. 5 (4): 167–180. doi:10.53575/u14.v5.04(21)167-180. ISSN 2707-1219.
- Rahman, Mujibur (2007). Comparative analysis of Syed Jamaluddin Afghani and Maulana Obaidullah Sindhi's concept of revolution (PhD) (in Urdu). Pakistan: Bahauddin Zakariya University.
- Hayee, Abdul; Afser, Qari Taj (2020). "Commentary of Sūrah al-Aḥzāb from the Manuscript "Ilhām al-Raḥmān" by ʻUbaidullāh al-Sindhī: Study and Annotation". Al-Qamar (in Arabic). 3 (2): 31–46. ISSN 2664-4398.
- Mawlana Ubayd Allah Sindhi's Mission to Afghanistan and Soviet Russia
- Ansari, K.H. (1986), Pan-Islam and the Making of the Early Indian Muslim Socialist. Modern Asian Studies, Vol. 20, No. 3. (1986), pp. 509-537, Cambridge University Press.
- Seidt, Hans-Ulrich (2001), "From Palestine to the Caucasus-Oskar Niedermayer and Germany's Middle Eastern Strategy in 1918. German Studies Review, Vol. 24, No. 1. (Feb., 2001), pp. 1-18", German Studies Review, German Studies Association, doi:10.2307/1433153, ISSN 0149-7952, JSTOR 1433153.
- Sims-Williams, Ursula (1980), "The Afghan Newspaper Siraj al-Akhbar. Bulletin (British Society for Middle Eastern Studies), Vol. 7, No. 2. (1980), pp. 118-122", Bulletin, London, Taylor & Francis Ltd, ISSN 0305-6139.
- Engineer, Ashgar A (2005), They too fought for India's freedom: The Role of Minorities., Hope India Publications., ISBN 81-7871-091-9.
- Sarwar, Muḥammad (1976), Mawlānā ʻUbayd Allāh Sindhī : ʻālāt-i zandagī, taʻlīmāt awr siyāsī afkār, Lahore
- Sindhī, ʻUbaidullāh; Sarwar, Muḥammad (1970), Khutbāt o maqālāt-i Maulānā ʻUbaidullāh Sindhī. murattib Muḥammad Sarvar, Lāhaur, Sindh Sāgar Ikādamī
- Maulana Ubaydullah Sindhi Deobandi in the Sight of Sheikh Muhammad Ikram
- An Analysis of the Work of Mulana Ubaid Ullah Sindhi
