= Raja Mahendra Pratap Singh University =

Public state university in Aligarth, India

- Type: State University
- Established: 2021; 5 years ago
- Accreditation: NAAC
- Vice-Chancellor: Prof. N. B. Singh
- Visitor: President of India
- Location: Aligarh, Uttar Pradesh, India; 27.9116500°N 77.9640289°E
- Campus: Urban; 92.27 acres
- Website: https://rmpssu.ac.in/

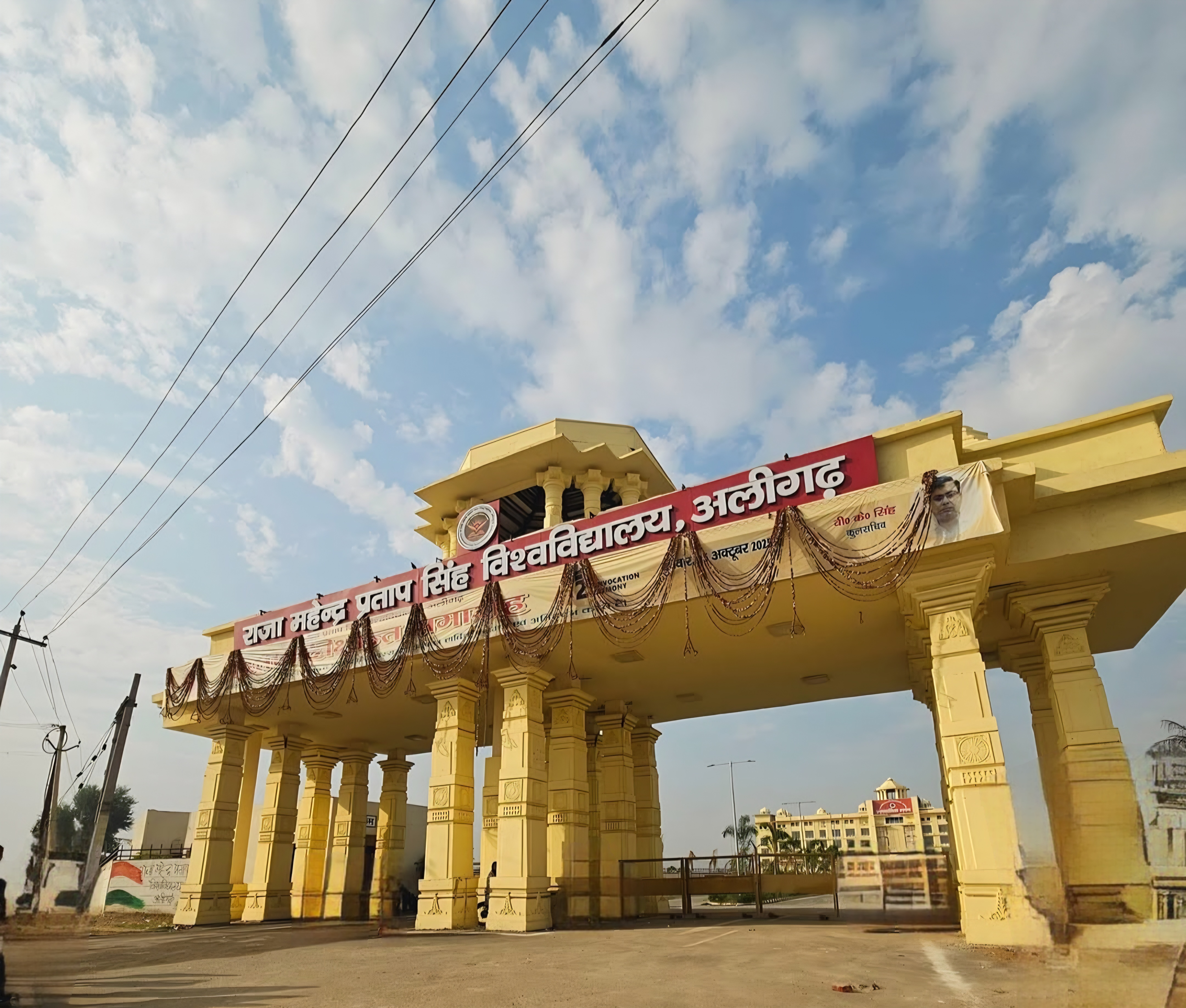
Main entrance of the university.

Raja Mahendra Pratap Singh University (abbreviated as RMPSU), also known as Raja Mahendra Pratap Singh State University, is a public state university located in the Aligarh district of Uttar Pradesh, India. Established in 2021 by the Government of Uttar Pradesh, it is a residential-cum-affiliating university recognised by the University Grants Commission (UGC). The university is named after the Indian freedom fighter, educationist and social reformer Raja Mahendra Pratap Singh.

The university was established to expand access to higher education in the Aligarh region and to provide a dedicated centre for higher education and research. According to university's official website, it currently has 381 associated colleges.

== History ==
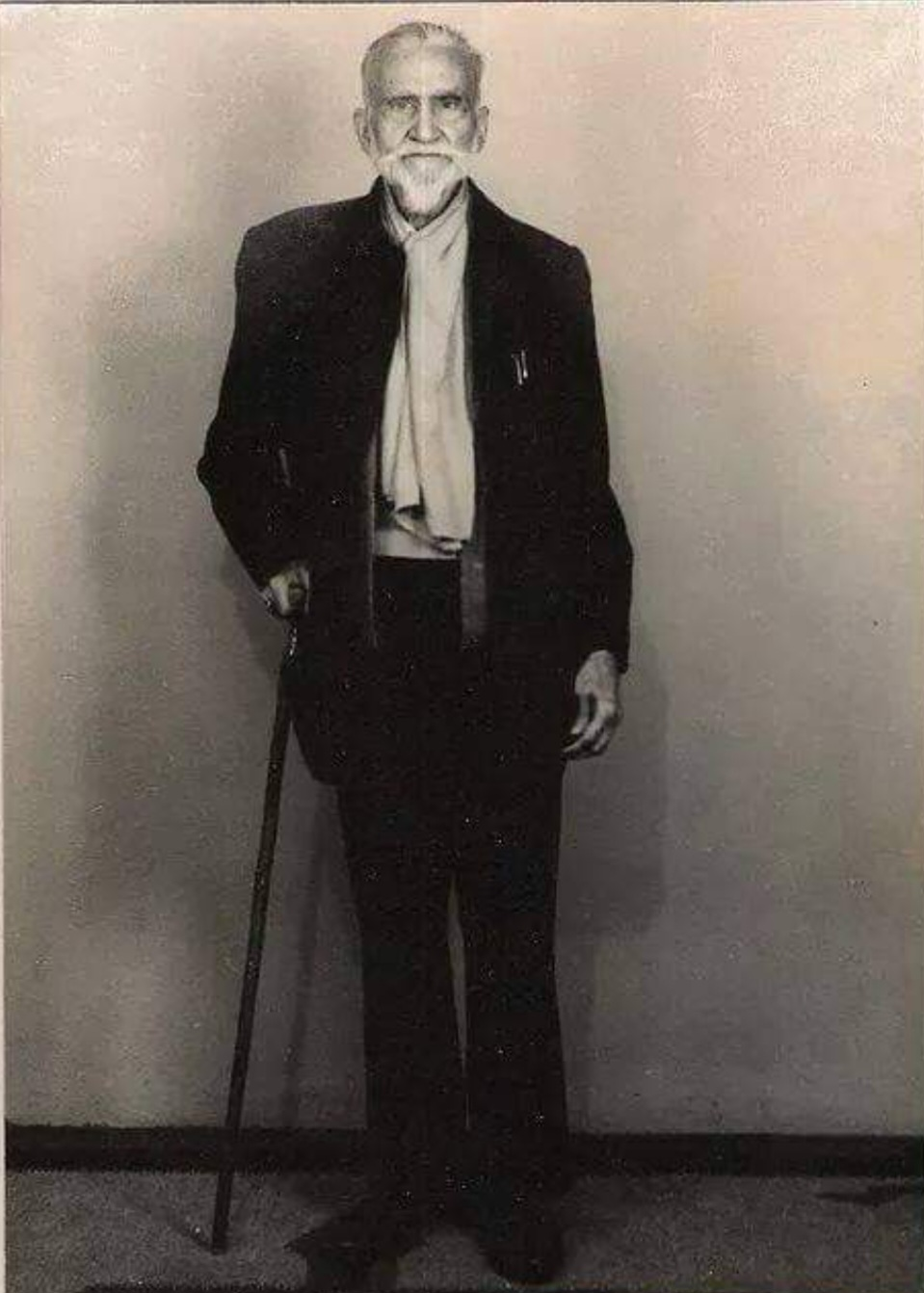
Raja Mahendra Pratap Singh, Indian independence activist, writer, journalist, nobel peace prize nominee, former president of provisional government of India and former ruler of Hathras and Mursan princely states.

The establishment of the university was announced in 2019, after which the necessary legal procedures were completed for its formation. On 14 September 2021, the foundation stone of the university was laid by Prime Minister Narendra Modi. The university was named in honour of Raja Mahendra Pratap Singh, an Indian freedom fighter, educationist and social reformer. He played a significant role in India's freedom struggle and was associated with the establishment of the Provisional Government of India in Kabul in 1915. He also contributed to the promotion of education and social reform.

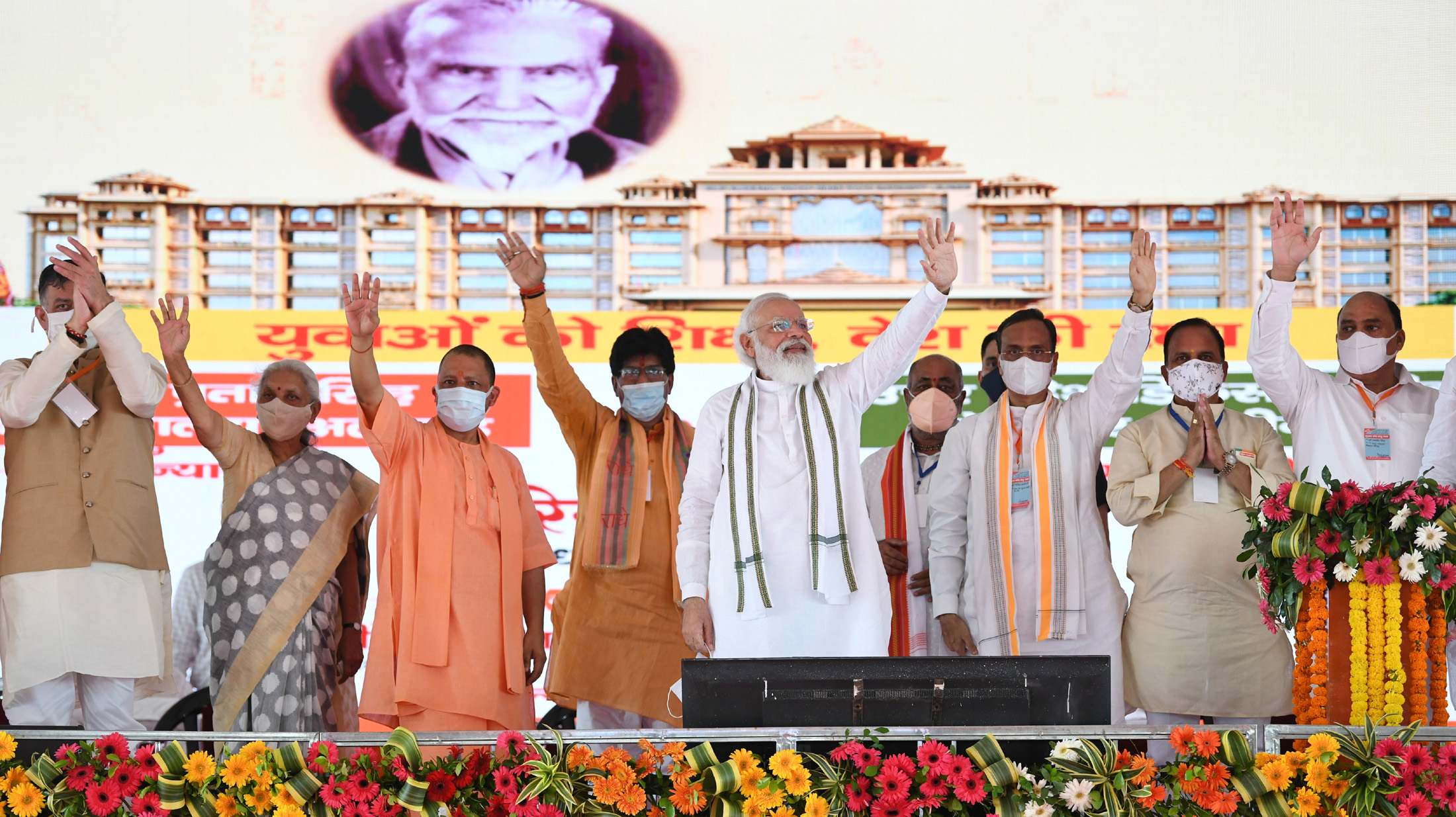
The Prime Minister, Shri Narendra Modi at the foundation stone laying ceremony of Raja Mahendra Pratap Singh University with Chief Minister Yogi Adityanath

== Campus ==
The university's campus is spread across an area of 92 acres, and is described by the institution as a vibrant and safe environment designed to support academic, professional and personal development of students.

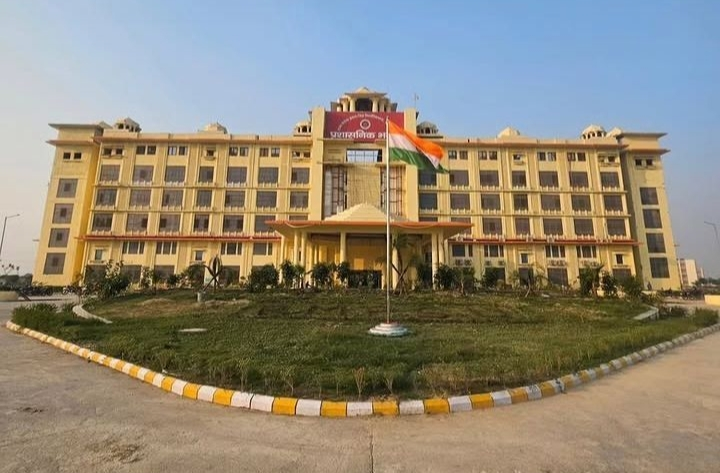
Image showing academic block of Raja Mahendra Pratap Singh University

The university provides infrastructure and facilities intended to support teaching, learning and research activities. According to university, these include modern library, a Wi-Fi-enabled campus and advance research facilities. The university also aims to provide opportunities for career development and to promote creative talent and scientific temperament among its students.

== Organization and administration ==
=== Administration ===
The university's administrative functions are supported by Registrar and other university officers and authorities. The registrar is responsible for overseeing various administrative activities and ensuring the implementation of university policies and regulations. Shri Pabuddh Singh is serving as the registrar of the university.

=== Faculties ===
Raja Mahendra Pratap Singh University offers academic programmes through various faculties. These faculties are listed below along with courses which they offers:

=== Faculty of Arts ===
- Economics
- English
- Geography
- Hindi
- Home Science
- Political Science
- Sociology
- Sanskrit
- History
- Psychology
- Defence and Strategic studies

=== Faculty of Science ===
- Biotechnology
- Zoology
- Botany
- Chemistry
- Physics
- Mathematics
- Environmental Science
- Computer Science

The university also offers programmes in Agriculture, Commerce and Law.

== See also ==
- Aligarh Muslim University
- Banaras Hindu University
- University of Allahabad
