= Harit Pradesh =

Harit Pradesh Haritanchal
- Proposed state
- Location of Harit Pradesh in India
- Country: India
- Region: Northern India
- Proposed capital: Meerut
- Proposed Divisions: List: Meerut division; Moradabad division; Agra division; Saharanpur division; Aligarh division; Bareilly division
- Language: Braj Bhasha and Khadiboli

Harit Pradesh is a proposed new state of India comprising the western parts of the state of Uttar Pradesh. The etymology derives from harit, meaning 'green', and pradesh, meaning 'state'. Other proposed names include Braj Pradesh, GurjarLand (which would include only parts of this region), Haritanchal and Paschim Pradesh. It consists of an area of 71,231 km^{2}, which is 29.27% of UP and a population of 6.67 crore, which is roughly 34% of UP.

The region has some demographic, economic and cultural patterns that are distinct from other parts of Uttar Pradesh, and more closely resemble those of Haryana, Punjab and North Rajasthan areas. For instance, dialects of Hindi spoken here (Khadiboli ,Gurjari and Braj Bhasha) are distinct from Bhojpuri spoken in Purvanchal and Awadhi in Central UP. Similarly, some of the festivals like Chhath puja are also significantly more popular in Purvanchal compared to Western Uttar Pradesh.

== Proposed capital ==
Meerut has been constantly proposed as the capital of this state by many leaders, including Dr. B.R Ambedkar, former Chief Minister Mayawati, and Union Minister Sanjeev Balyan. However, possibility of making a Tricity type of capital near Agra is also there. When the reorganisation happens, some other city may also emerge as the capital of state. Due to industrialisation and presence of infrastructure there are plenty of good candidates for a state capital in this region.

== History ==
In his 1955 critique of the proposed States Reorganisation Act, Thoughts on Linguistic States, Dr. B. R. Ambedkar had advocated the division of Uttar Pradesh into three states – Western, Central, and Eastern, with capitals at Agra, Kanpur and Prayagraj, respectively – in order to prevent excessively large states from dominating politics at the national level.

Later, socialists like Ram Manohar Lohia, Jayaprakash Narayan and Acharya Kripalani favoured a re-drawing of the administrative map of India. However, Jawaharlal Nehru, the prime minister at the time, supported the States Reorganisation Commission's (SRC) recommendation of re-forming states on a linguistic basis. K.M. Panikkar, in his dissenting note to the SRC report, however, opposed linguistic states and preferred the formation of a state of western Uttar Pradesh.

In 1972, fourteen MLAs in the Uttar Pradesh state assembly supported an unsuccessful resolution to divide the state into three units (Braj Pradesh, Awadh Pradesh and Purvi Pradesh). A similar resolution, however, was successfully passed from the state assembly in 2011 under then Chief Minister Mayawati.

== Regional disparities ==
Western UP alone accounts for more than 50% of the Gross State Domestic Product (GSDP) of Uttar Pradesh. By comparison, Bundelkhand contributes just 5.2%, Central UP 17.52% and Eastern UP 28%. Out of top 10 districts that contribute the most to state GSDP, 7 are from Western UP. In terms of Per Capita Gross District Domestic Product (GDDP) as well, 7 out of top 10 districts in the state are from Western UP. These include (in descending order):

Top districts by contribution to GSDP	Top districts by per capita GDDP
Gautam Buddha Nagar	Gautam Buddha Nagar
Agra	Meerut
Meerut	Etah
Ghaziabad	Agra
Bareilly	Amroha
Bijnor	Ghaziabad
Bulandshahar	Hapur

In FY 21–22, the total GDDP of Western UP region on market prices was 9.44 lakh crores while that of entire UP was 19.17 lakh crores. Constant GDDP of Western UP during the same period was 5.89 lakh crores, and for entire UP it was 11.81 lakh crores. Based on these figures, the per capita GDDP of Western UP turns out 79,425.47 INR, much higher than that of all UP at around 59,065 INR.

Western UP is also ahead of the rest of UP in terms of infrastructure, industrialisation, urbanisation, and overall quality of life. Some of its cities (i.e. Noida and Greater Noida) are on par with largest metro cities of the country. Even among smaller cities the quality of life is better compared to the rest of UP, as most of them are Tier-2 cities. Nine out of 15 tier-2 cities in the state are in Western UP.

Additionally, Western UP also accounts for almost 54% of all court cases reaching Allahabad High Court, which is on average around 500 km away from the cities of this proposed state and requires travelling all day for a simple hearing. Residents of western Uttar Pradesh have been demanding a high court bench in Meerut from a long time, but so far it hasn't been heard.

These huge economic disparities give people in Western UP a sense of having to pay up for the economic backwardness of other regions in their state. Additionally, the prospect of being clubbed with economically backward state of Bihar in general conversation with terms like "UP-Bihar", despite having a far more developed and advanced economy than Bihar, also doesn't go down well with the people in this region. These feelings, when combined with cultural differences and other incidents, such as having to struggle for a high court bench for decades, and allegations of lower allocations in state budget, further increase the discontent among politically aware people of the state, thus fuelling the demand for statehood of this region.

== Proponents and opponents ==
=== Political parties and leaders ===
Among the most prominent advocates for the creation of the new state in recent days have been BSP Supremo Mayawati and Late Chaudhary Ajit Singh, the son of former Prime Minister Chaudhary Charan Singh and leader of the Rashtriya Lok Dal (RLD).

After coming to power, Mayawati wrote letters to the prime minister three times in 2007, March 2008, and December 2009 regarding partitioning of Uttar Pradesh. In November 2011, Mayawati's cabinet also passed a resolution in State assembly to partition the state into four different states—Harit Pradesh, Awadh Pradesh, Bundelkhand and Purvanchal—for better administration and governance. However, since creating states is the domain of Central Government and the proposal wasn't actively taken by the UPA Government of that time, it couldn't be implemented.

Similarly, RLD also pushed for the statehood of Harit Pradesh in 2011. Pushpendra Singh, former General Secretary of Youth wing of RLD, even launched a political party called Harit Pradesh Party to demand the creation of a separate state of Western Uttar Pradesh. In 2011, Chaudhary Ajit Singh of RLD said:

"Western UP contributes to a large chunk – nearly 72% – of the state's total income. In turn, what western UP gets is not enough. Just 18% of the state's budget is spent on developing west UP. This anomaly, understandably, makes the people of this area dissatisfied".

He also alleged that in most years, funds allocated to west Uttar Pradesh were never spent.

Other Gurjar leaders, such as Ram Chandra vikal , Manmohan bhadana and kartar singh bhadana in Haryana, the leaders have also made efforts to involve themselves in the politics of creating a separate state.

Of the other main political forces in Uttar Pradesh, the Samajwadi Party has opposed the proposal, while the Indian National Congress and BJP have adopted a non-committal stance. Individual leaders of both Congress as well as BJP, however, have time and again spoken in favour of the statehood for Harit Pradesh. For instance:

- After the Congress working committee passed a resolution to recommend the creation of Telangana on 31 July 2013, Jairam Ramesh suggested that Uttar Pradesh's reorganisation was necessary as it is difficult to run such a big state effectively. He said:

"From an administrative point of view, a state of over 200 million people, 75 districts, over 800 blocks ... It's just not governable. It is my personal view...Its politics is a separate issue."

- Similarly, BJP leader Sanjeev Balyan also said while attending a university event in Meerut that Harit Pradesh should be a separate state with Meerut as its capital. He clarified though that this is his personal opinion and not the official party line.

In April 2024, while campaigning for Lok Sabha elections Mayawati again raised the issue of statehood for Western Uttar Pradesh, promising to take "concrete steps" for the same if her government came to power.

=== Communities ===
The creation of three new states in 2000 (Jharkhand from the division of Bihar, Uttarakhand from the division of Uttar Pradesh, and Chhattisgarh from the division of Madhya Pradesh) gave new impetus to the demand for Harit Pradesh among communities. The support further increased after formation of Telangana out of Andhra Pradesh in 2013. The Jats of this region, who are a dominant political and agricultural community spread across Pakistan, Punjab, Haryana, Rajasthan and Uttar Pradesh, have found themselves in a "politically disadvantageous position" in western Uttar Pradesh. Therefore, they are largely in support of statehood for Harit Pradesh

Major caste are : Gurjar , Bramhan , Jaat, Rajput and dalit .

Also, since the Muslim population in western Uttar Pradesh (27%, according to 2011 census) is higher than in Uttar Pradesh as a whole (20%), the proposal has found support from Muslim organisations as well.

== Geography ==
=== Soil conditions ===
Western Uttar Pradesh's soil and relief has marked differences from that of the eastern part of the state. The soil tends to be lighter-textured loam with some occurrences of sandy soil. Some loess soil is continuously deposited by winds blowing eastwards from Rajasthan's Thar Desert.

=== Precipitation ===
Harit Pradesh receives rain through the monsoon and western disturbances. The monsoon carries moisture northwards from the Indian Ocean, occurs in late summer and is important to the Kharif or autumn harvest. Western disturbances carry moisture eastwards from the Mediterranean Sea, the Caspian Sea, and the Atlantic Ocean. They primarily occur during the winter season and are important for the main staple of the region, wheat, which is classified as a rabi crop.

== Demographics ==
=== People of Harit Pradesh ===
Religions in Harit Pradesh
Religion	Percent
Hindus	71.32%
Muslims	27.00%
Sikhs	0.63%
Others	1.05%
Others Includes Christians, Buddhists, Jains.

According to the 2011 census of India, the total population of Western Uttar Pradesh is 67,766,583 people. Hindu population in this region is 48,331,625 (71.32%), Muslim population is 18,297,717 (27.00%) and Sikh Population is 426,929 (0.63%).The population of Harit Pradesh is composed of a varied set of communities and tribes, including Gurjars, Meos, Rajputs, jats Kayasthas, Tyagis, Ahir (Yadavs), Bhar (Rajbhars), Brahmins, Kachhi, Kahar (Kashyaps), Gadaria, Kumhar, Bania, Khatik, Lodhis, Valmikis, Nai, Jatav, Kurmis and Saini.

== District-wise population data (Census 2011) ==
=== Saharanpur division ===
District	Total Population	Hindu Population	Hindu %	Muslim Population	Muslim %
Saharanpur	3,466,382	1,966,894	56.74%	1,454,052	41.95%
Muzaffarnagar	2,869,934	1,649,938	57.49%	1,179,943	41.11%
Shamli	1,273,578	682,028	53.55%	531,510	41.73%
Saharanpur Division Totals	7,609,894	4,298,860	56.49%	3,165,505	41.60%

=== Moradabad division ===
District	Total Population	Hindu Population	Hindu %	Muslim Population	Muslim %
Moradabad	3,126,507	1,472,304	47.09%	1,588,297	50.80%
Bijnor	3,682,713	2,032,081	55.18%	1,585,210	43.04%
Rampur	2,335,819	1,073,890	45.97%	1,181,337	50.57%
Amroha (Jyotiba Phule Nagar)	1,840,221	1,075,440	58.44%	750,368	40.78%
Sambhal	2,199,774	1,435,210	65.24%	723,236	32.88%
Moradabad Division Totals	13,185,034	7,088,925	53.76%	5,828,448	44.21%

=== Bareilly division ===
District	Total Population	Hindu Population	Hindu %	Muslim Population	Muslim %
Bareilly	4,448,359	2,830,768	63.64%	1,536,534	34.54%
Budaun	3,127,621	2,361,210	75.50%	727,374	23.26%
Pilibhit	2,031,007	1,449,399	71.36%	489,686	24.11%
Shahjahanpur	3,006,538	2,410,454	80.17%	527,581	17.55%
Bareilly Division Totals	12,613,525	9,051,831	71.76%	3,281,175	26.01%

=== Meerut division ===
District	Total Population	Hindu Population	Hindu %	Muslim Population	Muslim %
Meerut	3,443,689	2,183,255	63.40%	1,185,643	34.43%
Bulandshahr	3,499,171	2,710,676	77.47%	777,407	22.22%
Gautam Buddha Nagar	1,648,115	1,395,088	84.65%	215,500	13.08%
Ghaziabad	3,343,334	2,528,110	75.62%	753,341	22.53%
Hapur	1,338,311	891,210	66.59%	433,435	32.39%
Baghpat	1,303,048	914,845	70.21%	364,583	27.98%
Meerut Division Totals	14,575,668	10,623,184	72.88%	3,729,909	25.59%

=== Aligarh division ===
District	Total Population	Hindu Population	Hindu %	Muslim Population	Muslim %
Aligarh	3,673,889	2,902,870	79.01%	729,283	19.85%
Hathras	1,564,708	1,413,858	90.36%	159,448	10.19%
Kasganj (Kanshiram Nagar)	1,436,719	1,217,318	84.73%	213,822	14.88%
Etah	1,774,480	1,611,104	90.79%	146,346	8.25%
Aligarh Division Totals	8,449,796	7,145,150	84.56%	1,248,899	14.78%

=== Agra Division ===
District	Total Population	Hindu Population	Hindu %	Muslim Population	Muslim %
Agra	4,418,797	3,922,718	88.77%	411,313	9.31%
Mathura	2,547,184	2,310,690	90.72%	216,933	8.52%
Firozabad	2,498,156	2,143,618	85.81%	314,812	12.60%
Mainpuri	1,868,529	1,746,649	93.48%	100,723	5.39%
Agra Division Totals	11,332,666	10,123,675	89.33%	1,043,781	9.21%

== Administrative divisions ==
Divisions which form part of Harit Pradesh are numbered as 1, 2, 3, 8, 9, 10

Western Uttar Pradesh includes 26 districts in six divisions:

1. Saharanpur division: Saharanpur, Muzaffarnagar, Shamli districts
2. Moradabad division: Moradabad, Bijnor, Rampur, Amroha, Sambhal districts
3. Bareilly division: Bareilly, Badaun, Pilibhit, Shahjahanpur districts
4. Meerut division: Meerut (Proposed Capital), Bulandshahr, Gautam Buddha Nagar, Ghaziabad, Hapur, Baghpat districts
5. Aligarh division: Aligarh, Hathras, Kasganj, Etah districts
6. Agra division: Agra, Mathura, Firozabad, Mainpuri districts

== Special economic zones ==
- Noida
- Greater Noida
- Meerut
- Bareilly
- Bulandshahr
- Moradabad

== Transport networks ==
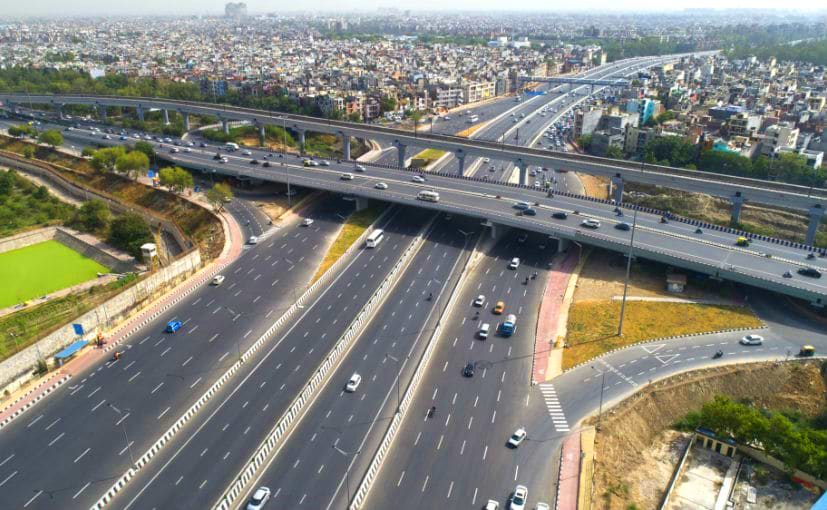
Delhi Meerut Expressway

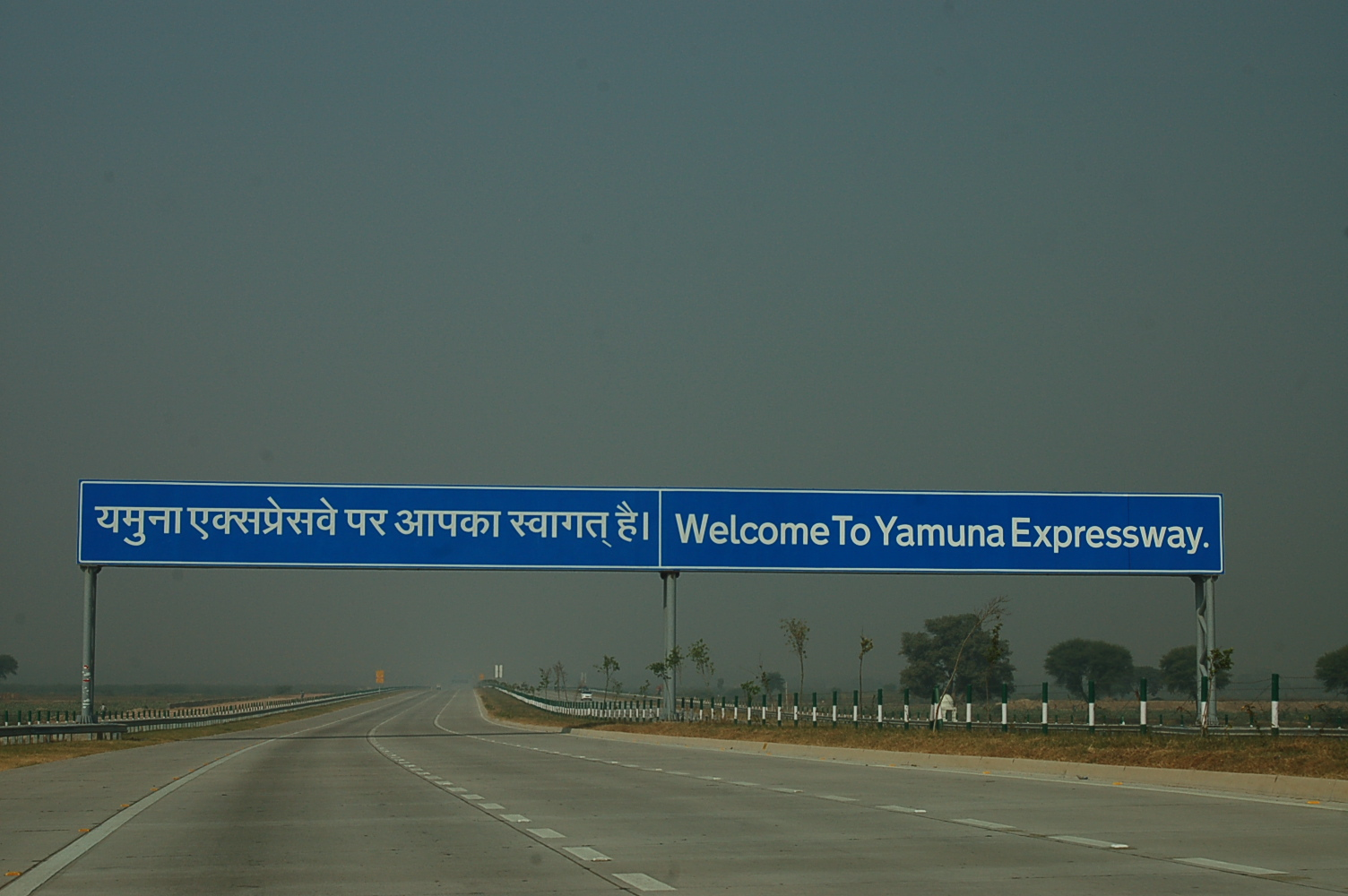
Yamuna Expressway

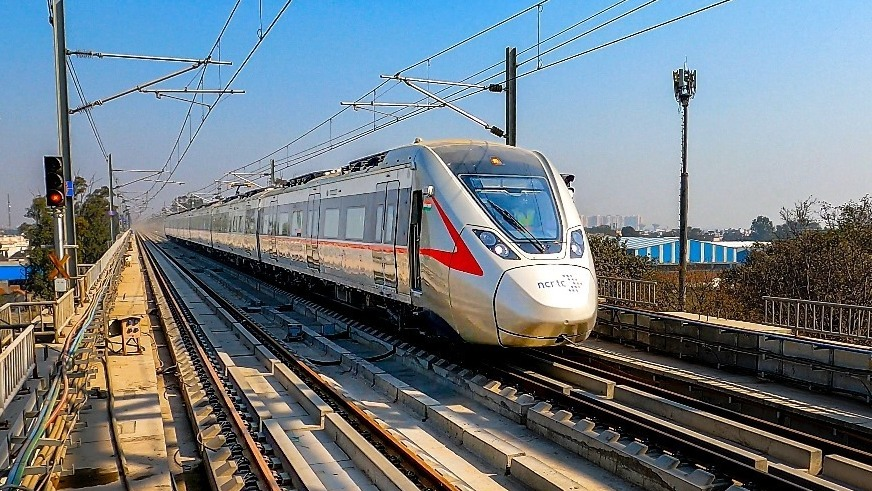
Delhi Meerut RRTS

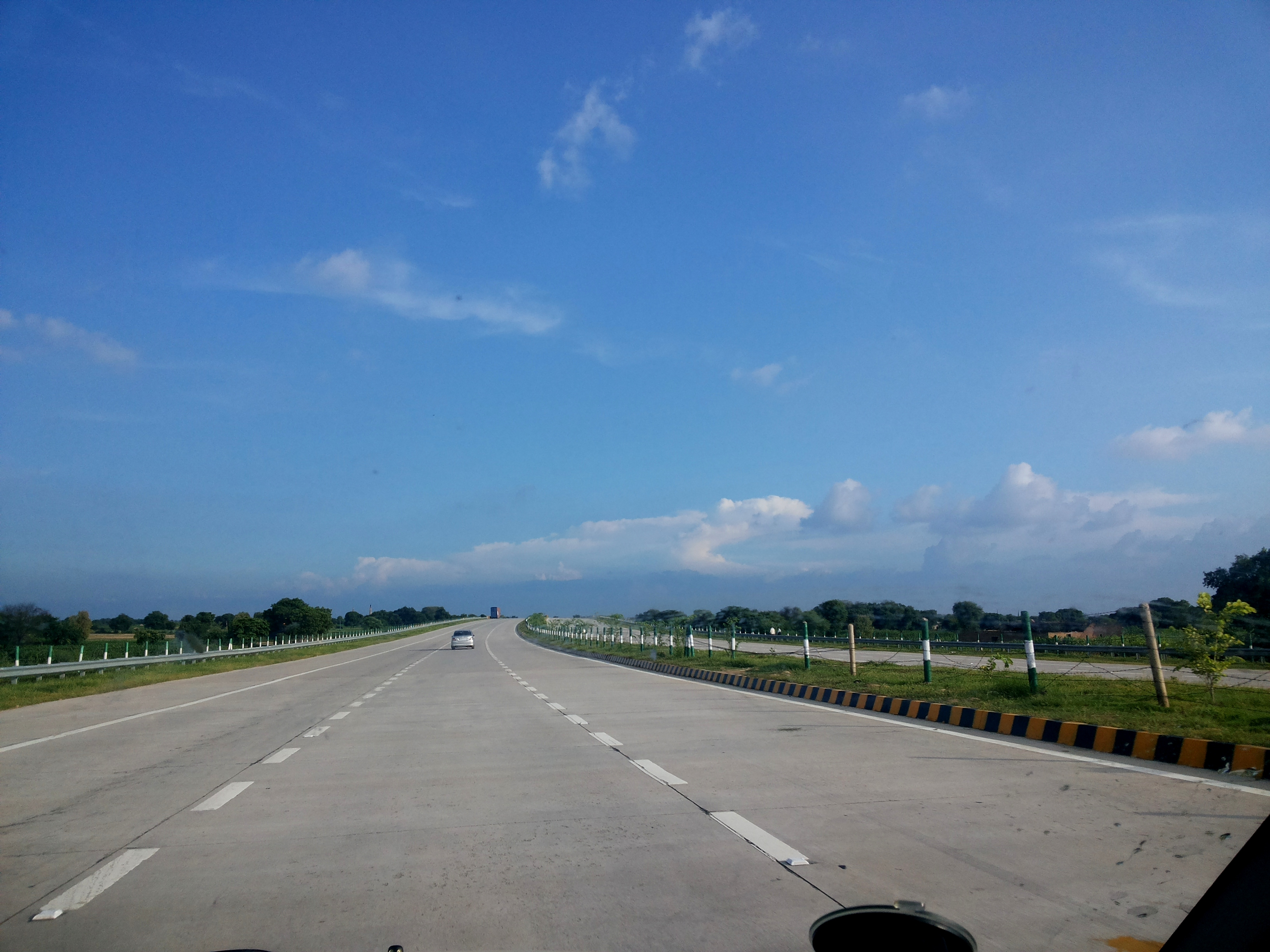
NH-58 in Meerut

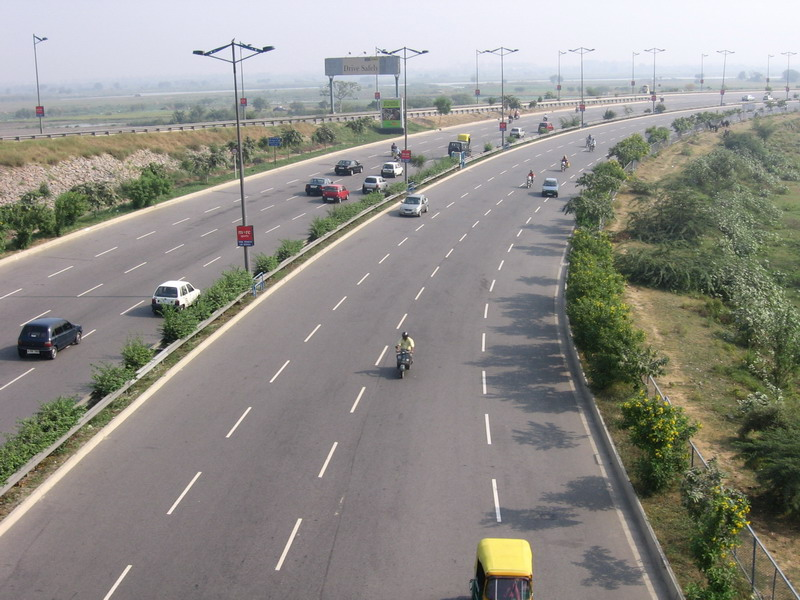
DND flyway in Noida

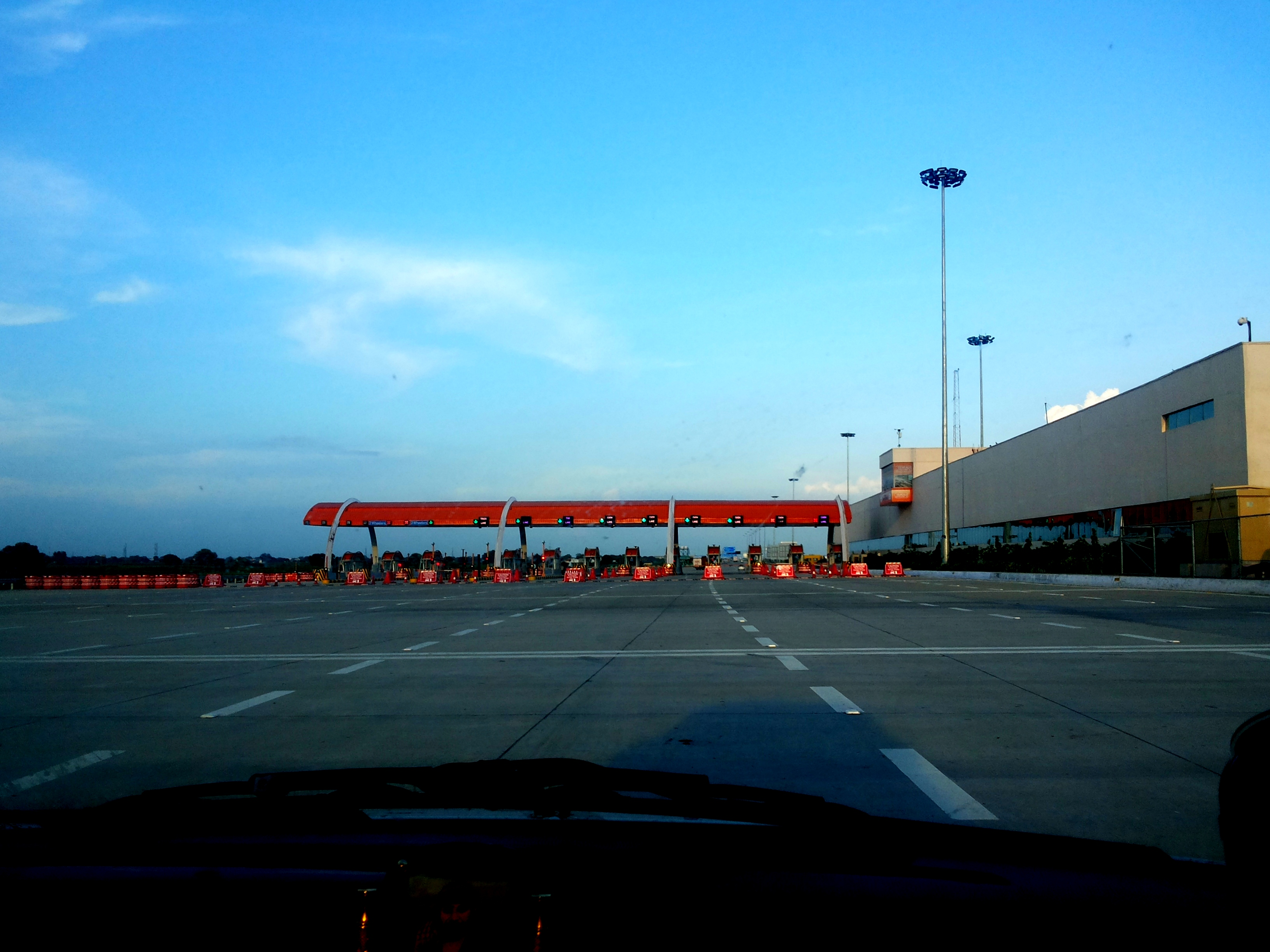
Toll Plaza at Mathura

Major state and national highways and other public transport systems in the proposed area include:

- DND Flyway
- Noida Greater Noida Expressway
- Delhi Meerut Expressway
- Delhi Meerut RRTS
- Ganga Expressway
- Yamuna Expressway
- Noida Metro
- Meerut Metro
- Agra Metro
- Bareilly Metro

The major highways running through the intrastate region include:

- NH-58
- NH-24
- NH-2
- NH 87
- NH 73
- NH 74
- NH 3
- NH 93

== Top 10 most populous cities (Census 2011) ==
Rank	City / Urban Agglomeration	Division	Population (2011)
1	Ghaziabad	Meerut Division	1,648,643
2	Agra	Agra Division	1,585,704
3	Meerut	Meerut Division	1,305,429
4	Bareilly	Bareilly Division	904,797
5	Moradabad	Moradabad Division	887,891
6	Aligarh	Aligarh Division	874,414
7	Saharanpur	Saharanpur Division	705,478
8	Noida	Meerut Division	637,272
9	Firozabad	Agra Division	604,214
10	Muzaffarnagar	Saharanpur Division	495,529

Source: Census of India 2011[44]

== Education ==
School	Location	Established	Comment	Ref.
Aligarh Muslim University	Aligarh	1920	Aligarh Muslim University is a public university funded by the Government of India. It was originally established by Sir Syed Ahmad Khan as Mohammedan Anglo-Oriental College in 1877.	
Chaudhary Charan Singh University	Meerut	1965	The university is named after Chaudhary Charan Singh, the fifth Prime Minister of India.	
Dr B. R. Ambedkar University	Agra	1927	This university was formed as Agra University and renamed in 1996.	
Gautam Buddha University	Greater Noida	2002		
M. J. P. Rohilkhand University	Bareilly	1975	M.J.P. Rohilkhand University was established in 1975 as an affiliating University. The senior faculty members of different disciplines in Humanities, Science and Technology are running research projects funded by various agencies and so far 49 projects funded by UGC, AICTE, DST, CST, ICAR, ICHR, MIF have been completed.	
Sardar Vallabhbhai Patel University of Agriculture and Technology	Meerut	2004		
Teerthanker Mahaveer University	Moradabad	2008	Teerthanker Mahaveer University is a private university in Moradabad, Uttar Pradesh.	
Glocal University	Saharanpur	2012	Glocal University is a private and coeducational institution located in Saharanpur, Uttar Pradesh, India. It is situated in the foothills of Shivalik mountains.	
Invertis University	Bareilly	2010		
Raja Mahendra Pratap Singh University	Aligarh	2021		
Maa Shakumbhari University	Saharanpur	2021		
Guru Jambheshwar University	Moradabad	2024		

== In pop culture ==
In 2022, a social comedy film titled Dasvi showed protagonist Abhishek Bachchan as the Chief Minister of Harit Pradesh. The film was premiered on Netflix and JioCinema.

== See also ==
- Delhi
- Haryana
- Rajasthan
- Uttar Pradesh
- Uttarakhand
- Western Uttar Pradesh
