= Avraham Abba Etz-Hadar =

Israeli spy

Avraham Abba Sheinbaum
- אברהם אבא שֶיינבאום
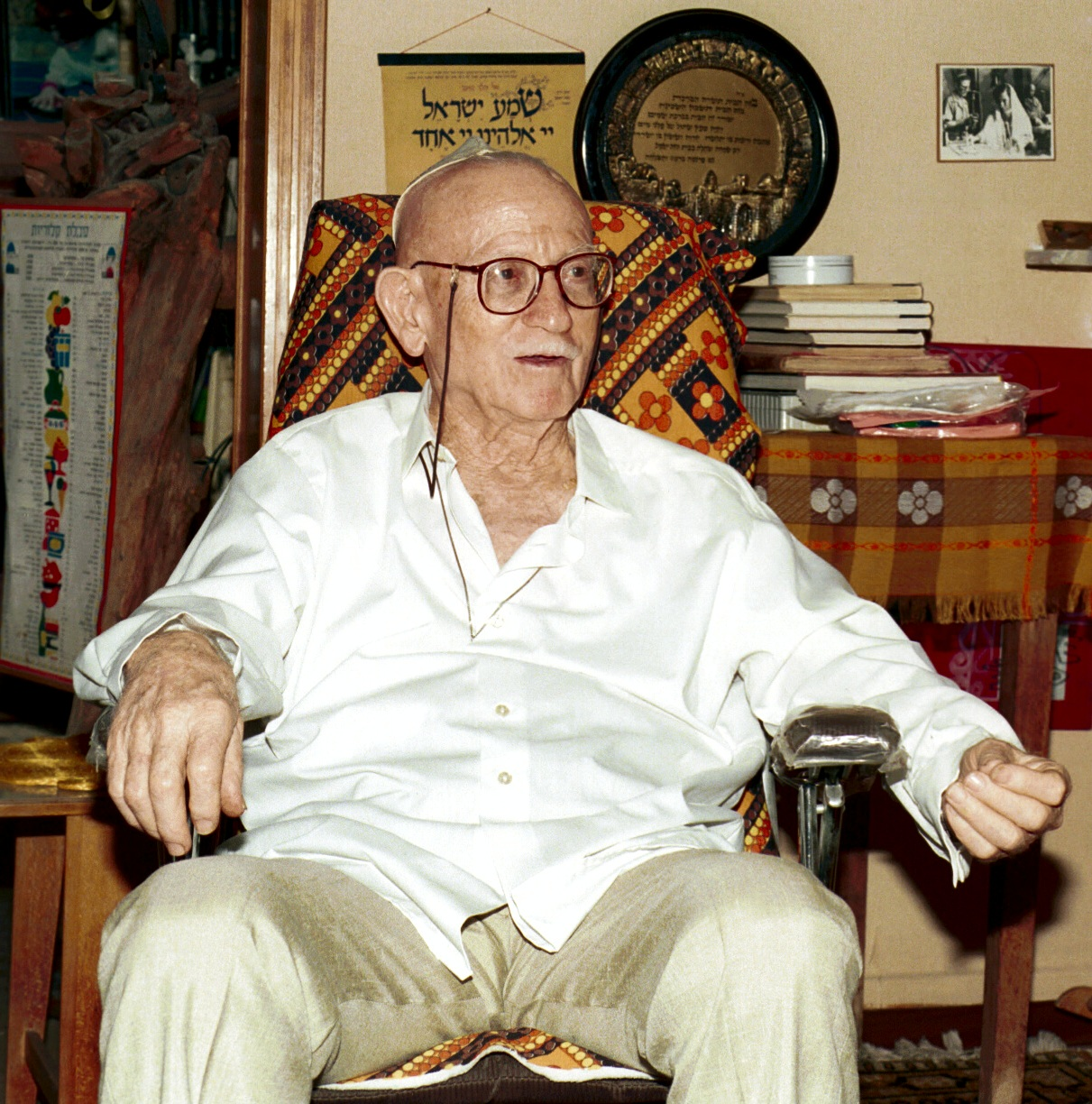
- Avraham Etz Hadar in his home, 1994
- Born: January 9, 1909; Jerusalem, Ottoman Syria
- Died: December 8, 1996 (aged 87)
- Military career
- Allegiance: Israel
- Branch: Haganah
- Nickname: Etz-Hadar
- Unit: Shai
- Known for: Incorporating pigeons in the Shai

Avraham Abba Etz-Hadar (Sheinbaum) (Hebrew: אברהם אבא עץ-הדר (שֶיינבאום); January 9, 1909 - December 8, 1996) was one of the founders of the Shai (Military Intelligence of the Haganah), the father of pigeon contact and pigeons in the Haganah service.

== Biography ==
Sheinbaum was born in Jerusalem. His great-great-grandfather, R. Meir son of Rabbi Yitzchak Sheinbaum, walked from Bohemia, Czech Republic to Israel. His paternal grandfather was Rabbi Michal Leib Katz, who founded many colonies and neighborhoods in Israel; Rabbi Kolel Ungrin Asher Anshil Neiman.

In 1927 Scheinbaum joined the Haganah, and two years later completed a commanders course. In 1930, he was in charge of the Jerusalem Hish (boys and girls who transmitted encrypted messages).

His preoccupation with ciphers led him to establish the code department of the Shai, at the same time being the commander of the Old City.

Etz-Hadar believed in pigeons as a means of quality communication, studied the subject, guided youth and published articles in the agricultural press of the locality. In 1938 he began to interest the defense leaders in pigeons, but did not receive a sympathetic response. In order to persuade the heads of the organization, he and Yisrael Galili sent a pigeon, from the head of the Histadrut House in Tel Aviv, to Jerusalem on June 7, 1939.

With the help of Eliezer Livneh, he managed to reach David Ben-Gurion, who agreed to allocate 75 pounds. Etz-Hadar traveled to Belgium, raised additional funds from local Jews and purchased 144 pigeons of a good breed. He established the first nest in the Rehavia neighborhood, in the yard of Rachel Yanait Ben-Zvi's home, then established sheds in the Tel Arza neighborhood, in Tel Aviv, in Givat Brenner, in Kiryat Haim, in Kfar Menachem, in Yagur, in Gedera and in other places.

After the establishment of the state, he worked in the absorption department of the Ministry of Education and was an educational consultant in the IDF.

In the 1970s, Etz-Hadar returned to the public consciousness, when he waged a public struggle with the Transcendental Meditation sect. He published a book on the subject and letters to the newspaper editors and confronted the cult representative on the TV show "Petals."
