= Taraknath Das =

Indian revolutionary (1884–1958)

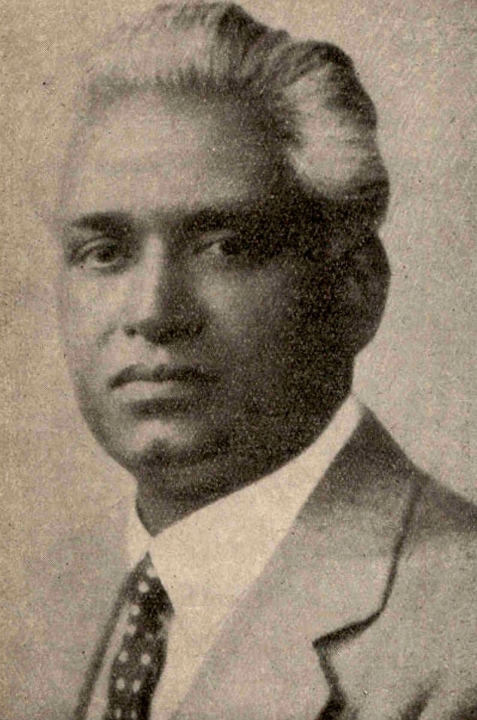
- Das, photographed in 1937
- Born: 15 June 1884; Kanchrapara, 24 Parganas, Bengal Presidency, British India
- Died: 22 December 1958 (aged 74); New York City, United States
- Occupation: Revolutionary
- Organization: Jugantar
- Spouse: Mary Keatinge Morse

Taraknath Das (or Tarak Nath Das; 15 June 1884 – 22 December 1958) was an Indian revolutionary and internationalist scholar. He was a pioneering immigrant in the west coast of North America and discussed his plans with Tolstoy, while organising the Asian Indian immigrants in favour of the Indian independence movement. He was a professor of political science at Columbia University and a visiting faculty member in several other universities.

== Early life ==
Taraknath was born at Majupara, near Kanchrapara, in the 24 Parganas district of West Bengal. Coming from a lower-middle-class family, his father Kalimohan was a clerk at the Central Telegraph Office in Calcutta. Noticing the flair of this brilliant student with the pen, his headmaster encouraged him to appear in an essay contest on the theme of patriotism. Impressed by the quality of the paper by a school boy of sixteen years, one of the judges, the Barrister P. Mitter, founder of the Anushilan Samiti, asked his associate Satish Chandra Basu to recruit the boy. On passing his Entrance Examination with very high marks, in 1901, Taraknath went to Calcutta and got himself admitted to the well-known General Assembly's Institution (now Scottish Church College) for university studies. In his secret patriotic activity, he found full support from his elder sister Girija.

== Genesis of a mission ==
To stir Bengali enthusiasm, commemoration of the achievements of Raja Sitaram Ray, one of the greatest Bengali Hindu heroes, was introduced as a festival, in addition to Shivaji. In the early months of 1906, Bagha Jatin or Jatindra Nath Mukherjee was accompanied by Taraknath when the former was invited to preside over the Sitaram Festival at Mohammadpur in Jessore, the ancient capital of Bengal. On this occasion, during a closeted meeting around Jatin were present, in addition to Tarak, Shrish Chandra Sen, Satyendra Sen and Adhar Chandra Laskar: all the four, one after the other, were to leave for higher studies abroad. Nothing was known about the object of this meeting till in 1952 when, during a conversation, Taraknath spoke of it. Along with specific higher education, they were to acquire military training and knowledge of explosives. They were especially urged to create a climate of sympathy among people of the free Western countries in favour of India's decision to win freedom. In 1931, following a visit to Italy, he wrote "fascism stands for liberty with responsibility and it is opposed to all forms of license. It gives precedence to Duty and Strength, as one finds in the teachings of the Bhagvad Gita."

== Life in North America ==
A photograph of Das, unknown year

Disguised as a monk under the name of Taraknath Brahmachari, he left for Madras on a lecture tour. After Swami Vivekananda and Bipin Chandra Pal he was the first person in the region who raised such a passion by his patriotic speeches. Among young revolutionaries he particularly inspired Nilakantha Brahmachari, Subrahmania Shiva and Chidambaram Pillai. In 1905, he went to Japan to escape persecution by British authorities. However, the Meiji government started cracking down on liberation movements after they renewed a treaty with the British. On 16 July 1907, Taraknath reached Seattle. After earning his livelihood as a farm-worker, he was appointed at the laboratory of the University of California, Berkeley, before enrolling himself as a student. Simultaneously, qualifying as translator and interpreter of the American Civil Administration, he entered the Department of Immigration, Vancouver, in January 1908. There he witnessed the arrival of William C. Hopkinson (1878–1914) of the Calcutta Police Information Service, appointed as Immigration Inspector and interpreter for Hindi, Punjabi and Gurumukhi. During seven long years, until his assassination (by a Sikh), Hopkinson was required to send detailed and regular reports to the Government of India about the presence of such student radicals as Tarak, and monitor a group of pro-British Sikh informants headed by Bela Singh.

With Pandurang Khankhoje (B.G. Tilak's emissary), Taraknath founded the Indian Independence League. Adhar Laskar arrived from Calcutta with funds sent by Jatin Mukherjee (also known as Bagha Jatin), permitting Taraknath to start his journal Free Hindustan in English, as well as its Gurumukhi edition, Swadesh Sevak ('Servants of the Motherland') by Guran Ditt Kumar who came from Calcutta on 31 October 1907. Free Hindustan has been claimed by Constance Brissenden as "the first South Asian publication in Canada, and one of the first in North America." They were assisted by Professor Surendra Mohan Bose, who was an expert in explosives. Through regular correspondence, personalities like Leo Tolstoy, Henry Hyndman, Shyamji Krishnavarma, and Madame Cama encouraged Taraknath in his venture. Described as "community spokesman", he had established Hindustani Association in Vancouver in 1907.

Fully conversant with existing laws, Taraknath served the needs of his compatriots, most of whom were illiterate migrants from the Punjab region. In Millside, near New Westminster, he founded the Swadesh Sevak Home, a boarding school for the children of the Asian Indian immigrants. Apart from that, this school also held evening classes on English and mathematics, and thus helped the immigrants to write letters to their families or to their employers. This also helped them in fostering greater awareness of their duties towards India and their rights in their adopted homeland. There were about two thousand Indians, mostly Sikh, on the west coast of Canada and North America. The majority worked in agriculture and construction. After an initial setbacks, these Indian farmers succeeded in obtaining a bumper crop of rice in California in the early 1910s, and a good number of them worked on the building of the Western Pacific Railway in California, along with indentured immigrants from China, Japan, Korea, Norway and Italy. Radicals like Taraknath mobilised the Indian community to retaliate against anti-Indian violence and politics of exclusion.

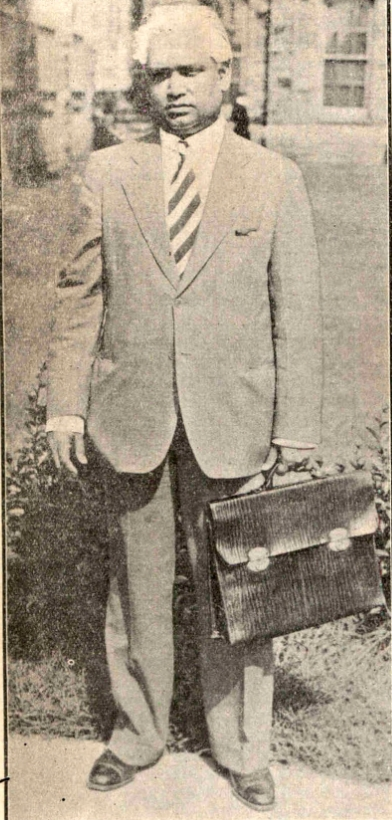
Das pictured in Washington D.C.; featured in Calcutta's 1934 Modern Review

Being a suspect of extracting bribes from the Asian Indian immigrants, Hopkinson used his influence to make Taraknath a scapegoat and eventually got him expelled from Canada by the middle of 1908. Leaving Bose, Kumar and Chagan Khairaj Varma (also known as Husain Rahim) in charge of the compatriots' fate, Taraknath left Vancouver to better concentrate on the areas from Seattle to San Francisco. On reaching Seattle, since its July 1908 issue, Free Hindustan became a more overtly anti-British organ, with a motto from Tarak: "To protest against all tyranny is a service to humanity and the duty of civilization." The Irish revolutionary George Freeman of the NYC-based Gaelic American newspaper was looked upon as the real leader of the anti-British movement, closely connected with two Indians, Samuel L. Joshi and Barakatullah. Invited by Fitzgerald, Taraknath issued the August and the succeeding numbers of Free Hindustan from New York. In 1908, Taraknath joined the Norwich University, Northfield, Vermont, "a high-class engineering and military establishment, in order to receive military training. He also applied for enlistment (…) in the Vermont National Guard…" Despite his popularity among the students of all ethnic origins, he was rusticated from that institution due to his anti-British activities (such as editing Free Hindustan). By the end of 1909, he returned to Seattle.

== Founding the Ghadar Party ==
"A direct appeal to the Sikhs" appeared in the September–October 1909 issue of the Free Hindustan, reproduced by the Swadesh Sevak; the article ended with : "Coming in contact with free people and institutions of free nations, some of the Sikhs, though laborers in the North American Continent, have assimilated the idea of liberty and trampled the medals of slavery…" In March 1912 a letter published in The Punjabee' asked for a leader to come and help organise Indians in the area in view of the rising revolutionary spirit. Originally they discussed inviting Kumar and then Sardar Ajit Singh. However, when Taraknath arrived he suggested inviting Lala Hardayal, whom he knew from his days at Stanford University. Hardayal agreed to work with him setting up the Hindi Association of the Pacific Ocean, which provided the first basis for the Ghadar Party. "Many of the leaders were of other parties and from different parts of India, Hardayal, Ras Bihari Bose, Barakatulah, Seth Husain Rahim, Tarak Nath Das and Vishnu Ganesh Pingley… The Ghadar was the first organized violent bid for freedom after the rising of 1857. Many hundreds paid the price with their lives," wrote Khushwant Singh.

== From Berlin to Kabul ==
In 1914, he was admitted as a Research Fellow at the University of California at Berkeley. Taraknath passed his M.A. examination and started his PhD dissertation on International Relationship and International Law, while joining the teaching staff of that university. He later earned his PhD degree from the University of Washington in political science. To have a greater freedom of action, in that year he also acquired American citizenship. With the help of professors like Robert Morss Lovett, Upham Pope, Arthur Rider at UC Berkeley and David Starr Jordan and Stuart of Palo Alto (of Stanford University), Taraknath established the East India Association. He was invited by the International Students' Association as a delegate of the American universities. He had already been informed about the Indo-German Plan and in January 1915, met Virendranath Chattopadhyay in Berlin. For that meeting, Barakatullah and Hardayal also arrived in Berlin. They all formed a close group to accompany Raja Mahendra Pratap in his Kabul expedition.

In April 1916 the Shiraz-ul-Akhbar of Kabul reproduced a speech by Taraknath from a Constantinople paper : it praised the work of the German officers busy training the Ottoman army and the intrepidity and bravery of the Turks. He pointed out that it was Germany and Austria who declared war and not the Allies, and that their reason for doing so was to purify the earth of the brutal atrocities practised on mankind by their enemies, and to save the unfortunate inhabitants of India, Egypt, Persia, Morocco and Africa from the English, French and Russians who had forcibly seized their countries and had reduced them to slavery. Taraknath stressed the point that Turkey entered the war not only to defend her own country and to maintain her liberty, but also to put new life into 300 million Muslims, and to establish the Afghan state on a firmer basis, one that would act as a link with 350 million Indians, both Hindus and Muslims, as its supporters and helpers. (Political, p. 304)

Taraknath returned to California in July 1916. After that he set out for Japan with the project of a vast study on Japanese Expansion and its Significance in World Politics. This study appeared as a book in 1917 with the title, Is Japan a menace to Asia ?. The foreword of this book was written by the former Chinese Prime Minister Tang Shaoyi. In collaboration with Rash Behari Bose and Herambalal Gupta, he was about to leave on a mission to Moscow, when Taraknath was called back to appear in the infamous Hindu German Conspiracy Trial. The all-white jury accused him as "the most dangerous criminal" and it was proposed to withdraw his American citizenship and surrender him to the British police. On 30 April 1918, he was sentenced to twenty-two months in prison, which he served at Leavenworth Penitentiary. Efforts by the British government to have him deported to India were rejected.

== Academic career ==
After his release in 1920, Taraknath married his long-time friend and benefactress Mary Keatinge Morse. She was a founding member of the National Association for the Advancement of Colored People and the National Woman's Party. With her, he went on an extended tour of Europe. He made Munich his headquarters for his activities. It was there that he founded the India Institute, that awarded scholarships to meritorious Indian students who pursued higher studies in Germany. He maintained a close contact with Sri Aurobindo, and pursued inner spiritual discipline. On his return to the United States, Taraknath was jointly appointed as the professor of political science at the Columbia University and a Fellow of the Georgetown University. With his wife, he opened the resourceful Taraknath Das Foundation in 1935, to promote educational activities and to foster cultural relations between the US and Asian countries.

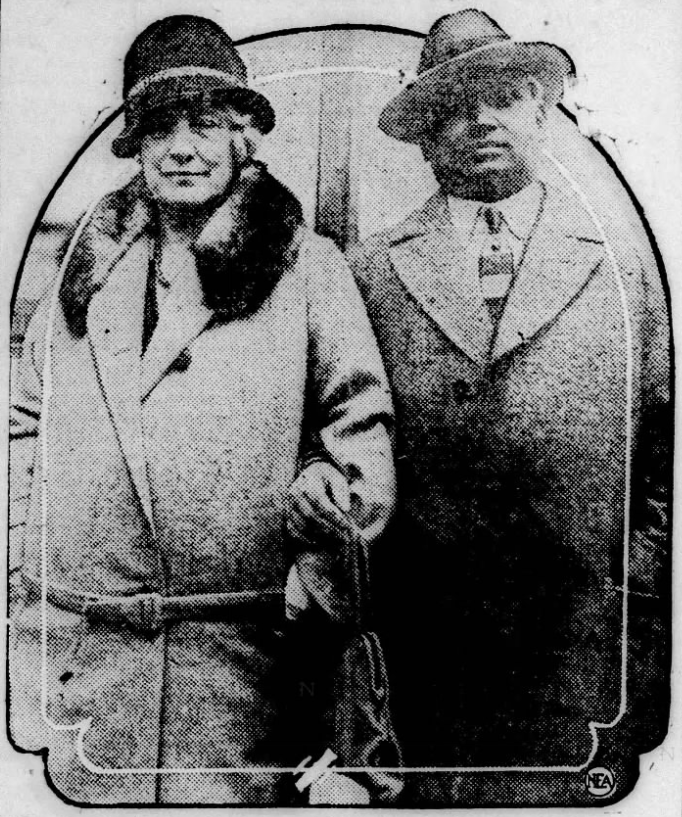
Mary Keatinge and Taraknath Das in 1927.

== The Tarak Nath Das Foundation ==
Currently, this foundation awards grant money to Indian graduate students studying in the United States, who have completed or are about to complete one year of graduate work, and are working towards a degree. There are Tarak Nath Das funds at about a dozen universities in the States. Only the fund at Columbia University, called the Mary Keatinge Das Fund, has a fairly significant amount of money in it and the income is used to fund lectures and conferences on India. Other participatory universities are the University of Pittsburgh, New York University, the University of Washington, the University of Virginia, Howard University, Yale University, the University of Chicago, the University of Michigan, the University of Wisconsin–Madison, American University, and the University of Hawaii at Manoa.

== Later life ==
Taraknath was among those who suffered emotionally from the Partition of India in 1947 and vehemently opposed the process of balkanisation of South Asia till his last day. After forty-six years in exile, he revisited his motherland in 1952, as a visiting professor of the Watumull Foundation. He founded the Vivekananda Society in Calcutta. On 9 September 1952, he presided over the public meeting to celebrate the 37th anniversary of Bagha Jatin's heroic martyrdom, urging the youth to revive the values upheld by his mentor, Jatindâ. He died upon return to the United States on 22 December 1958, aged 74.

== See also ==
- A Letter to a Hindu, a 1908 letter to Das written by Leo Tolstoy

== Sources ==
- "Das, Taraknath (Dr.)" in Dictionary of National Biography, (ed.) S.P. Sen, 1972, Vol I, pp363–4
- Political Trouble in India: A Confidential Report, by James Campbell Ker, 1917, reprinted 1973
- Sadhak biplabi jatindranath, by Prithwindra Mukherjee, West Bengal State Book Board, 1990, pp441–469
- San Francisco Trial Report, 75 Volumes; Record Groups 49, 60, 85 & 118 (US National Archives, Washington D.C. & Federal Archives, San Bruno)
- M.N. Roy Library & Gadhar Collection (South/Southeast Library, University of California, Berkeley)
- "Taraknath Das" by William A. Ellis, in Norwich University 1819–1911, Vol. III, 1911
- "Deportation of Hindu Politics" by Sailendra Nath Ghose, in The Dial, 23 August 1919, pp145–7
- "The Vermont Education of Taraknath Das: An Episode In British-American-Indian Relations" by Ronald Spector, in Vermont History, Vol.48, No.2, 1980 (illustrated), pp88–95
- "Taraknath in Madras" by Akoor Anantachari, in Sunday Standard, Chennai, 31 May 1964
- Taraknath Das: Life and Letters of a Revolutionary in Exile, by Tapan K. Mukherjee, National Council of Education, Kolkata, 1998, 304pp
- Op. cit.: a review by Santosh Saha, in Journal of 3rd World Studies, Spring, 2000
