= Hans von Hentig =

Hans von Hentig (9 June 1887, in Berlin – 6 July 1974, in Bad Tölz) was a German criminal psychologist and politician. He was the second son of lawyer Otto von Hentig (1852–1934). His older brother was later diplomat Werner Otto von Hentig. Otto von Hentig was one of the leading lawyers in Berlin. Hans von Hentig was instrumental in the setting up of a short-lived Bavarian Soviet Republic in 1919. During the 1920s, he was a prominent exponent of National Bolshevism. He emigrated to United States in 1935. Hans von Hentig worked for some time at Yale and other universities.
