= Guran Ditt Kumar =

Indian revolutionary

Guran Ditt Kumar, also known as G.D. Kumar Singh, was an Indian revolutionary associated with the pioneers of the Gadhar movement involved in the Indo-German conspiracy during the First World War.

== Beginning in the North-West of India ==
Guran Ditt Kumar was a native of Bannu on the North-West Frontier Province, now in Pakistan. "Guran Ditta" is Punjabi for "Given By the Gurus" - a comparatively common name in the Sikh community, so his actual name is more likely to be Guran Ditta Singh. In 1893 the 2,640 km long Durand line was created to separate British India from the rebel tribes in Afghanistan. Kumar began his working life as an apprentice to an Indian photographer at Rawalpindi.

== Emigration to West Bengal ==
Attracted by the National College at Kolkata with Sri Aurobindo as principal, in 1907 he joined it as a teacher of Hindi and Urdu. Earlier he had come to know Taraknath Das and Surendramohan Bose. Moreover, the Maratha Lodge, where he resided, was a boarding-house frequented by other revolutionary suspects of the time. Arrested in Mumbai, in February 1909, Ganesh Savarkar, brother of Vinayak Savarkar, was found in possession of "60 pages of closely typed matter in English, which proved to be a copy of the same bomb manual (…) found in the Manicktolla garden [in Kolkata]. Savarkar's copy was more complete, as it contained 45 sketches of the bombs, mines and buildings to illustrate the text." (Ker, p182).

== Activity in Canada ==
On 31 October 1907, Kumar landed in Victoria, B.C., and was received by Taraknath Das to look after a grocery store. In February 1908, the Canadian Press accused him of directing a seditious organisation among the Sikh labourers in British Columbia; he repudiated this charge in a letter published in the Punjabee of Lahore on 5 November 1908, claiming himself to be a Sikh, signing himself G.D. Kumar Singh. Constantly visiting Taraknath Das in Seattle, in August 1909, he settled there. In November he opened at 1632, 2nd Avenue West, Fairview, in Vancouver, a hostel called the Swadesh Sewak ('Servant of the Motherland') : in addition to a night school of Shashida type, to teach English and Mathematics, the building was used for the office and the press of the a monthly paper of the same name that he published in Gurumukhi, broadly reflecting the objectives of Free Hindustan edited by Taraknath Das. "Its tone generally became more and more objectionable, and as it was addressed principally to the Sikhs in the Indian Army in their own language, and was being sent out to India in considerable numbers (…) Its importation into India was prohibited in March 1911, under the Sea Customs Act." (Ker, pp230–231). With a new immigration law passed on 9 May 1910, when the condition of Indians in British Columbia further deteriorated, Kumar as the Secretary of the local Hindustani Association wrote, on 28 June, to the Prime Minister of Canada to protest against the unfair move. Availing of Tarak's return to Vancouver in September, they utilised the temper of the Indians to organise among them a revolutionary movement. (Bose, p53).

These grievances were to bring about much trouble in the future years. For example, reports of two meetings held at Vancouver on 24 April and at Victoria on 15 May 1910, Kumar in the May issue of his paper discussed:

- (1) The law creates an unfair distinction between the European and the Indian subjects of the British Government.
- (2) Indians are subjected to an additional disgrace in that even Japanese are admitted more readily than they are.
- (3) Only Indians who have come direct from an Indian port are admitted: two examples of the working of this rule are given.
- (4) As there is no direct route from India to Canada, the above rule operates to prevent immigration altogether.
- (5) Other countries, e.g., the United States, have laws to prohibit the immigration of Chinese and other labourers; but Canada prohibits even the immigration of Indian merchants and students as in the case of Jogesh Chandra Misra who was sent out by a Kolkata association as a student, was prevented from landing, and is now studying at Seattle University.
- (6) Even the members of the families of Indians owning land in Canada have to show 200 dollars each on landing.
- (7) The present law is a restriction on the liberty of the subject.
- (8) Other British subjects get a vote after six months' residence, but Indians do not. No doubt such anti-Indian distinctions exist in America, Germany or Japan; the result of the Canadian law is that Indians have to admit with regret that they are better off in foreign countries than in British territory. (Ker, pp. 231–232). The paper came to an end in 1911. In spite of a considerably moderate tone than that of the Free Hindustan, Kumar as much as Das raised the presumption of sedition, as confirmed by the discovery early in 1911 which they distributed, the Bande Mataram published by Madame Cama and the Talvar by Virendranath Chattopadhyay from Paris. They drew the attention of Sikhs in America and India to the "vulgar effusions" of certain Canadian papers on the immigration question.

Both Das and Kumar with the help of Surendramohan Bose and Hussain Rahim had set to bring together the various Indian communities in terms of a united action, until it reached the climax in the Gadhar organisation. Bose had been sent to Japan by the Scientific and Industrial Association of Kolkata in 1906. On reaching Canada at the end of 1907, Bose had informed Sri Aurobindo on 26 December, that Bengalis were wrong in hoping for Japanese help in their nationalist movement, although they had some sympathisers. Specialised in chemistry, he also toured as a lecturer on Indian subjects.

In 1913, he became the general secretary of the Hindustan Association of the USA. Shortly before leaving America, in 1913, from Chicago, he sent to Harnam notes and formulae of his own for making bombs. In January 1914, Bose wrote again from Paris along with "a valuable copy of the process used by the Russian Revolutionists..." Having visited revolutionaries in Paris and Geneva, Bose reached India in February 1914. Harnam Singh (of Sahri) was the other important revolutionary who shared with them this patriotic task : a former trooper of the 4th Cavalry in India, he had gone to China in 1904 and, three years later, reached Canada with Kumar. In 1908-09, he attended school at Seattle and went to Vancouver as Kumar's guest. In a letter to Das, in July 1913, Kumar described Harnam as the leader of the revolutionary movement in Vancouver. Owing to his friendship with Harnam, Baba Gurdit Singh of the Komagata Maru affair knew well this zealous group and, prior to his expedition, had received from Das names and addresses of the leading Jugantar figures such as Atulkrishna Ghose and Satish Chakravarti, who worked under Jatindranath Mukherjee. Harnam was deported from San Francisco on 26 September 1914.

== Mission to the Far East ==
While the Gadhar ramifications extended widely, in May 1913, Kumar sailed from San Francisco for the Philippine Islands. He plainly expressed the object of this trip when he wrote Taraknath Das : "I am going to establish a base at Manila (P.I.) forwarding Depôt, supervise the work near China, Hongkong, Shanghai. Professor Barakatullah is all right in Japan." (Ker, p237). According to Ker's report, "he was engaged in supervising the work of the Ghadr Party in the Far East. Amongst the correspondence of Harnam Singh of Sahri were several letters from G.D. Kumar showing that he was working hard on behalf of the cause. He was in constant touch with Bhagwan Singh and Barakatullah and was collecting money for the Ghadr campaign and was sending to Har Dayal. He afterwards went to Japan, where he busied himself meeting Ghadr parties passing through Yokohama on the way to India." (p425).

== Last Trace ==
In the Special List of Record Group 118 (Records of the U.S. Attorney) preserved in San Francisco, and in San Francisco Chronicle of 19 January 1918, we find report of Taraknath Das's trial as defendant. Kumar, too, was mentioned during the 1917–18 San Francisco Trial consisting of 'The German Hindu Conspiracy' and 'Violations of U.S. Neutrality 1913–20.' He was accused of having "formed party in Shanghai in 1914. Associate of German agent Mueller and of Scrinivas (sic!) R. Wagel. Sent arms and ammunition to revolutionary agents in India." No further information is available on this rebel's later life.
