= A Letter to a Hindu =

Letter from Leo Tolstoy about the Indian independence movement in 1908

- Original title: Письмо к индусу
- Created: December 14, 1908
- Author: Leo Tolstoy
- Subject: Nonviolent revolution, Indian independence, anti-colonialism, religious unity

"A Letter to a Hindu" (also known as "A Letter to a Hindoo") is a letter written by Leo Tolstoy to Tarak Nath Das on 14 December 1908. The letter was written in response to two letters sent by Das, seeking support from the Russian author and thinker for India's independence from colonial rule. The letter was published in the Indian newspaper Free Hindustan.

The letter caused the young Mohandas Karamchand Gandhi to write to Tolstoy to ask for advice and for permission to reprint the Letter in Gandhi's own South African newspaper, Indian Opinion, in 1909. Gandhi was living in South Africa at the time and just beginning his activist career. He then translated the letter himself, from the original English copy sent to India, into his native Gujarati.

It took Tolstoy "seven months, 29 drafts, and 413 manuscript pages" to prepare the 6,000-word letter. This considerable effort on the part of Tolstoy may point to the historical significance of the document.

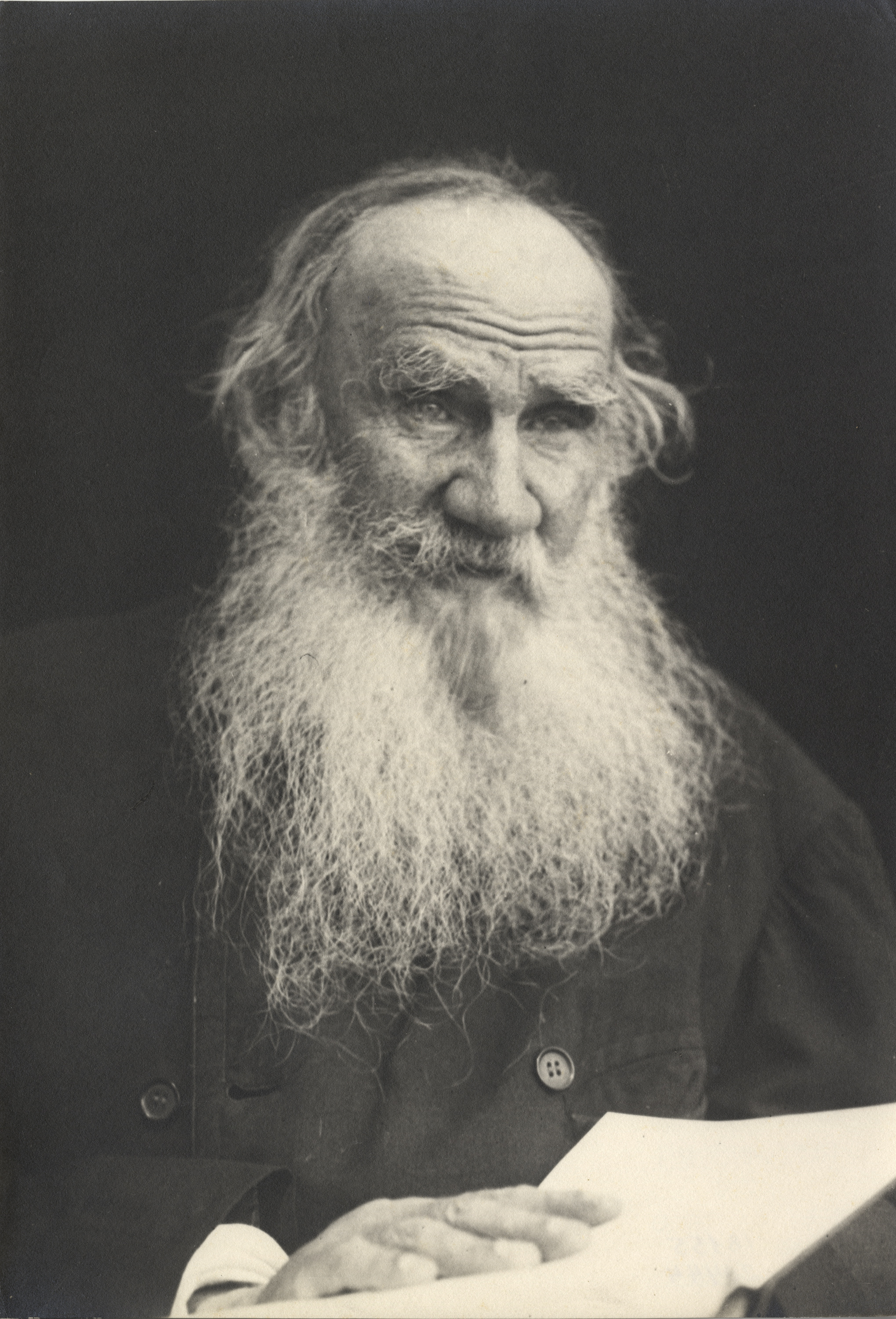
Leo Tolstoy

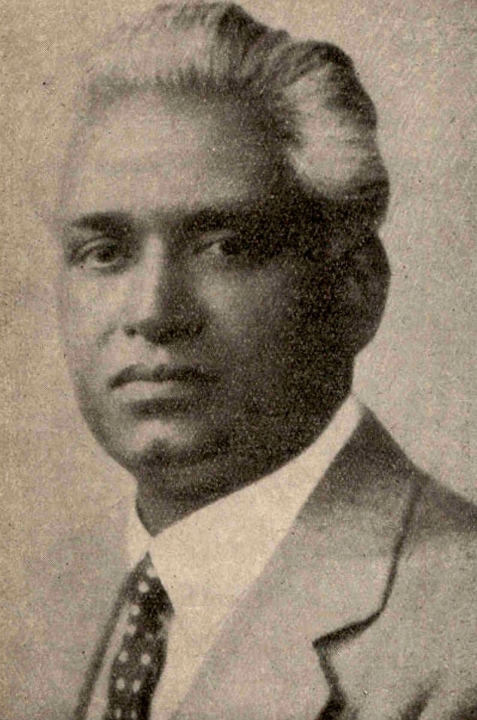
Taraknath Das

In "A Letter to a Hindu", Tolstoy argued that only through the principle of love could the Indian people gain independence from colonial rule. Tolstoy saw the law of love espoused in all the world's religions, and he argued that the individual, nonviolent application of the law of love in the form of protests, strikes and other forms of peaceful resistance were the only alternative to violent revolution. These ideas ultimately proved to be successful in 1947 in the culmination of the Indian independence movement.

In this letter, Tolstoy mentions the works of Swami Vivekananda; he also quotes the teachings of Krishna and Jesus. This letter, along with Tolstoy's views, preaching, and his 1894 book The Kingdom of God Is Within You, helped to form Mohandas Gandhi's views about nonviolent resistance.

The letter introduced Gandhi to the ancient Tamil moral literature the Tirukkuṟaḷ, which Tolstoy referred to as 'Hindu Kural'. Gandhi then took to studying the Kural while in prison.

== See also ==
- Leo Tolstoy bibliography
- Tirukkural
- Christian anarchism
- Mahatma Gandhi (1929) The Story of My Experiments with Truth
- Turn the other cheek
- Tolstoy Farm
