= Provisional Government of India =

Provisional government-in-exile

- 1915–1919
- Flag (Note: No colour of the flag has been established)

- Territory claimed by the Provisional Government of India shown in dark green
- Status: Government in exile
- Capital: New Delhi (claimed)
- Headquarters: Kabul, Afghanistan
- Demonym: Indian
- President
  - 1915–1919: Mahendra Pratap
- Prime Minister^{c}
  - 1915–1919: Maulana Barkatullah
- Historical era: World War I · Interwar Period
  - Established: 1 December 1915
  - Disestablished: January 1919
- Currency: Afghan rupee (de facto)
- ISO 3166 code: IN

The Provisional Government of India was a provisional government-in-exile established in Kabul, Afghanistan on 1 December 1915 by the Indian Independence Committee during World War I with support from the Central Powers. Its purpose was to enrol support from the Afghan Emir as well as Tsarist (and later Bolshevik) Russia, China, and Japan for the Indian Movement. Established at the conclusion of the Kabul Mission composed of members of the Berlin Committee, German and Turkish delegates, the provisional government was composed of Mahendra Pratap as President, Maulana Barkatullah as Prime Minister, Deobandi Maulavi Ubaidullah Sindhi as Home Minister, Deobandi, Maulavi Bashir as War Minister, and Champakraman Pillai as Foreign Affairs Minister. The provisional government found significant support from the internal administration of the Afghan government, although the Emir refused to declare open support, and ultimately, under British pressure it was forced to withdraw from Afghanistan in 1919.

== Background ==
Mahedra Pratap, centre, at the head of the Mission in Kabul, 1916 with the German and Turkish delegates. Seated to his right is Werner Otto von Hentig.

During World War I, Indian nationalists in Germany and United States, as well as the Indian revolutionary underground and Pan-Islamists from India attempted to further the Indian cause with German finance and aid. The Berlin-Indian committee (which became the Indian Independence Committee after 1915) sent an Indo-German-Turkish mission to the Indo-Iranian border to encourage the tribes to strike against British interests. The Berlin committee was also at this time in touch with the Khairi brothers (Abdul Jabbar Khairi and Abdul Sattar Khairi), who had at the onset of the war, settled at Constantinople and later in 1917 proposed to the Kaiser a plan to lead tribes in Kashmir and North-West Frontier Province against British interests. Another group led by the Deobandi Maulana Ubaid Allah Sindhi and Mahmud al Hasan (principle of the Darul Uloom Deoband) had proceeded to Kabul in October 1915 with plans to initiate a Muslim insurrection in the tribal belt of India. For this purpose, Ubaid Allah was to propose that the Amir of Afghanistan declares war against Britain while Mahmud al Hasan sought German and Turkish help. Hasan proceeded to Hijaz. Ubaid Allah, in the meantime, was able to establish friendly relations with Amir. At Kabul, Ubaid Allah, along with some students who had preceded him to make way to Turkey to join the Caliph's "Jihad" against Britain, decided that the pan-Islamic cause was to be best served by focussing on the Indian Freedom Movement.

== The Mission to Kabul ==
Ubaid Allah's group was met by the Indo-German-Turkish mission to Kabul in December 1915. Led by Oskar von Niedermayer and nominally headed by Raja Mahendra Pratap, it included in its members Werner Otto von Hentig, the German diplomatic representative to Kabul, as well as, Barkatullah, Chempakaraman Pillai and other prominent nationalists from the Berlin group. The mission, along with bringing members of the Indian movement right to India's border, also brought messages from the Kaiser, Enver Pasha and the displaced Khedive of Egypt, Abbas Hilmi expressing support for Pratap's mission and inviting the Amir to move against India. The mission's immediate aim was to rally the Amir against British India and to obtain from the Afghan Government a right of free passage.

Although the Amir refused to commit for or against the proposals at the time, it found support amongst the Amir's immediate and close political and religious advisory group, including his brother Nasrullah Khan, his sons Inayatullah Khan and Amanullah Khan, religious leaders and tribesmen. It also found support in one of Afghanistan's then most influential newspaper, the Siraj al-Akhbar, whose editor Mahmud Tarzi took Barkatullah as an officiating editor in early 1916. In a series of articles, Tarzi published a number of inflammatory articles by Raja Mahendra Pratap, as well as publishing increasingly anti-British and pro-Central articles and propaganda. By May 1916 the tone in the paper was deemed serious enough for the Raj to intercept the copies. A further effort resulted in the establishment in 1916 of the Provisional Government of India in Kabul.

== Formation of Provisional Government ==
Although hopes of the Amir's support were more or less non-existent, the Provisional Government of India was formed in early 1916 to emphasise the seriousness of intention and purpose. The government had Raja Mahendra Pratap as President, Barkatullah as Prime Minister and Sibnath Banerjee, Ubaidullah Sindhi as the Ministers for India, Maulavi Bashir as War Minister and Champakaran Pillai as Foreign Minister. It attempted to obtain support from Tsarist Russia, Republican China, Japan. Support was also obtained from Galib Pasha, proclaiming Jihad against Britain.

Following the February Revolution in Russia in 1917, Pratap's Government is known to have corresponded with the nascent Soviet Government. In 1918, Mahendra Pratap had met Trotsky in Petrograd before meeting the Kaiser in Berlin, urging both to mobilise against British India. Under pressure from the British, Afghan cooperation was withdrawn and the mission closed down. However, the mission, and the offers and liaisons of the German mission at the time had profound impact on the political and social situation in the country, starting a process of political change that ended with the assassination of Habibullah in 1919 and the transfer of power to Nasrullah and subsequently Amanullah and precipitating the Third Anglo-Afghan War that led to Afghan Independence.

They attempted to establish relations with foreign powers." (Ker, p305). In Kabul, the Siraj-ul-Akhbar in its issue of 4 May 1916 published Raja Mahendra Pratap’s version of the Mission and its objective. He mentioned : "…His Imperial Majesty the Kaiser himself granted me an audience. Subsequently, having set right the problem of India and Asia with the Imperial German Government, and having received the necessary credentials, I started towards the East. I had interviews with the Khedive of Egypt and with the Princes and Ministers of Turkey, as well as with the renowned Enver Pasha and His Imperial Majesty the Holy Khalif, Sultan-ul-Muazzim. I settled the problem of India and the East with the Imperial Ottoman Government, and received the necessary credentials from them as well. German and Turkish officers and Maulvi Barakatullah Sahib were went with me to help me; they are still with me." Under pressure from the British, the Afghan Government withdrew its help. The Mission was closed down.

== Impact ==
It has been suggested by a number of historians that the threat posed by the Hindu–German Conspiracy itself was the key spurring political progression in India. Especially, the presence of Pratap's enterprise in Afghanistan, next to India, and the perceived threats of Bolshevik Russia together with the overtures of Pratap's provisional government seeking Bolshevik help were judged significant threats to stability in British India.

While the Montagu–Chelmsford Reforms in 1917 initiated the first rounds of political reform in the Indian subcontinent, a "Sedition Committee" called the Rowlatt Committee (chaired by Sydney Rowlatt, an English judge) was instituted in 1918 which evaluated the links between Germany, the Berlin Committee, Pratap's enterprise (termed German agents in Afghanistan) and the militant movement in India, especially in Punjab and Bengal. The committee did not find any evidence of Bolshevik involvement, but concluded that the German link was definite. On the recommendations of the committee, the Rowlatt Act, an extension of the Defence of India Act 1915, was enforced in response to the threat in Punjab and Bengal.

In Afghanistan itself, the mission was the catalyst to a rapid radical and progressive political process and reform movement that is culminated in the assassinations of the Emir Habibullah Khan in 1919 and his succession by Amanullah Khan that subsequently precipitated the Third Anglo-Afghan War.

== Notes ==
- Ansari, K.H. (1986), "Pan-Islam and the Making of the Early Indian Muslim Socialist", Modern Asian Studies, vol. 20, no. 3, Cambridge University Press, pp. 509–537
- Seidt, Hans-Ulrich (2001), "From Palestine to the Caucasus-Oskar Niedermayer and Germany's Middle Eastern Strategy in 1918", German Studies Review, 24 (1 (Feb 2001)), German Studies Association: 1–18, doi:10.2307/1433153, JSTOR 1433153
- Sims-Williams, Ursula (1980), "The Afghan Newspaper Siraj al-Akhbar", Bulletin (British Society for Middle Eastern Studies, vol. 7, no. 2, London, Taylor & Francis Ltd, pp. 118–122, doi:10.1080/13530198008705294, ISSN 0305-6139
- Hughes, Thomas L (October 2002), "The German Mission to Afghanistan, 1915–1916", German Studies Review, 25 (3), German Studies Association: 447–476, doi:10.2307/1432596, JSTOR 1432596
- Tinker, Hugh (October 1968), "India in the First World War and after", Journal of Contemporary History, 3 (4, 1918-19: From War to Peace), Sage Publications: 89–107, doi:10.1177/002200946800300407, S2CID 150456443
