= Eliezer Livneh =

Israeli journalist and politician (1902–1975)

- אליעזר ליבנה
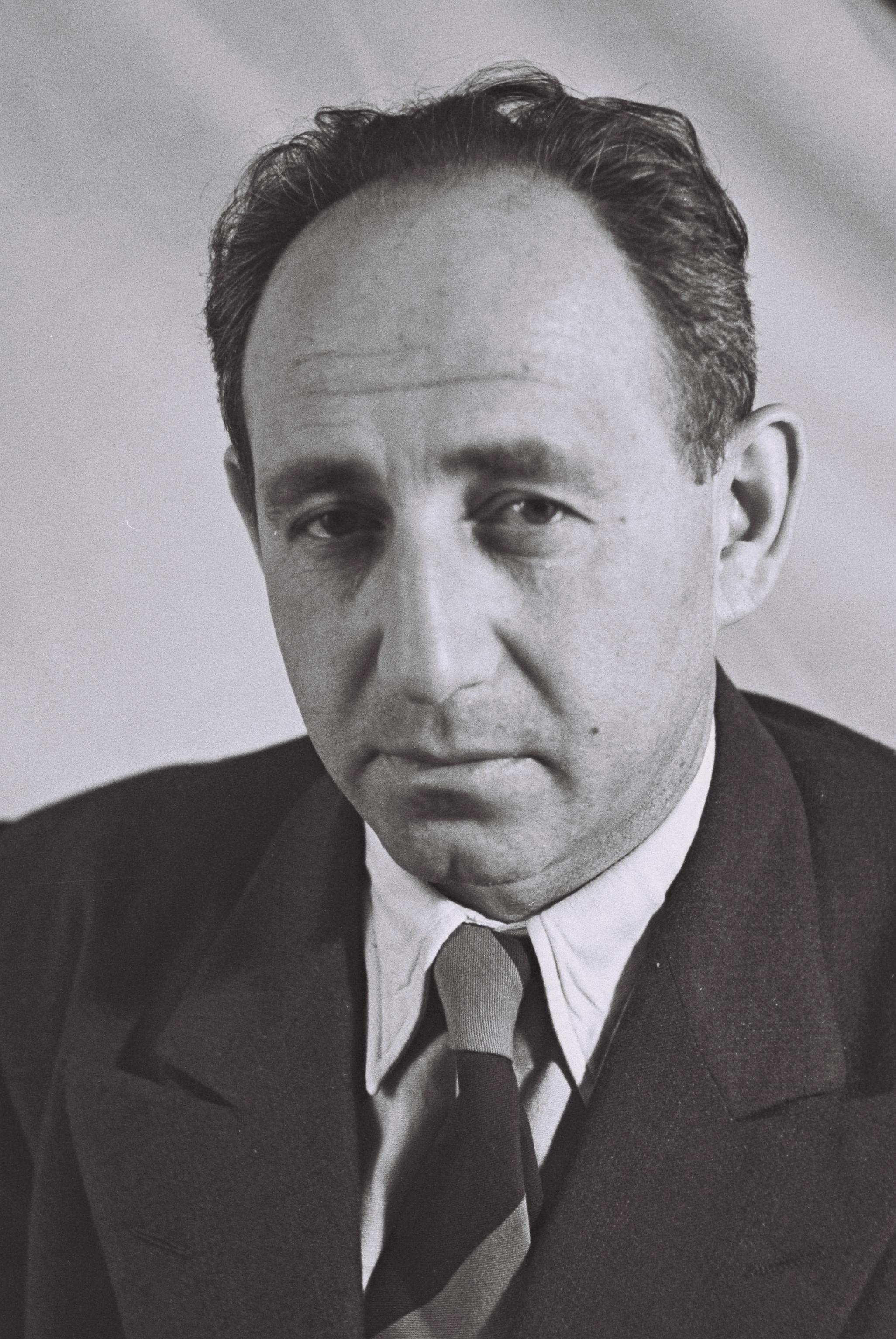

Faction represented in the Knesset
- 1949–1955: Mapai

Personal details
- Born: 2 December 1902 Łódź, Russian Empire
- Died: 1 March 1975 (aged 72) Jerusalem, Israel

Eliezer Livneh (Hebrew: אליעזר ליבנה; born 2 December 1902, died 1 March 1975) was a Zionist activist, journalist, publicist and Israeli politician. He is known for his activism against nuclear proliferation of the Middle East and for his endorsement of the Greater Israel cause.

== Biography ==
Eliezer Liebenstein (later Livneh) was born in Łódź in the Russian Empire (now Poland) in 1902, but his family moved to Rostov-on-Don at the outbreak of World War I. In 1920, he immigrated to Palestine and worked as a road builder. He then joined Ahdut HaAvoda and in 1923 he was elected Secretary of the Haifa Workers Council. That year he also joined Kibbutz Ein Harod, of which he would be a member for many years. He was the Haavara emissary to Germany from 1928 to 1930 and again from 1933 to 1935, seeking to encourage immigration to Palestine and transfer of assets. His experiences of the Nazi rise to power made him an opponent of totalitarian regimes of any kind, including that of Joseph Stalin, which was popular among many in the proletarian movement. Between 1937 and 1939 he studied in England.

== Journalism and literary career ==
After the outbreak of World War II he became a propagandist for the Haganah and Mapai and was the founder (with Galili and Gershon Rivlin) and editor of Maarachot (meaning both "systems" and "military campaigns"), a newspaper on military affairs, in 1939.

In 1940 he published another newspaper, Ashnav ("porthole") with Berl Katznelson. Edited by Livneh, it became the voice of the "activist" faction of Mapai for seven years until it went too far by publishing an obituary listing the names of Dov Gruner, Yehiel Drezner and Eliezer Kashani—Irgun members who became Olei Hagardom in April 1947—alongside Haganah casualties who were killed during the illegal immigration activities. Published a few months after the King David Hotel Bombing and shortly after the disbandment of the Jewish Resistance Movement, the analogy between Irgun and Haganah casualties was unacceptable to the Haganah and resulted in the closing of Ashnav.

He founded and edited a more successful journal, Beterem ("before"), from 1942 to 1960. He was also known for his oratory and was active in both Kol Jerusalem, the Mandate authorities operated radio station, and Kol Israel, Haganah's illegal radio station, in which he was also an editor.

In addition to writing several books, he was also an editor of the Encyclopedia Hebraica as an expert on Jerusalem, Zionism, Socialism, and Russian history.

== Political career ==
A few days before the Provisional State Council's Declaration of Independence of 12 May 1948, he was sent by David Ben-Gurion to Menachem Begin to tell him he and his men would be subject to Ben-Gurion's government, to which Begin consented. After the establishment of the State of Israel, he was elected for Mapai to the first and second Knessets, and was a member of the Foreign Affairs and Defense Committee. He supported the dispersion of the population, giving preference to the periphery rather than the center area. He was among the activist members of the party, taking an ardent pro-American stand in the struggle against Mapam, regarding Israel's relation with the United States and the Soviet Union. When MK Yaakov Hazan said that the USSR is his second homeland, Livneh said command positions are not to be put in the hands of people with more than one homeland.

In 1952 he was reprimanded by Foreign Minister Abba Eban for meeting with the Pakistani ambassador at the United Nations. Before the elections to the third Knesset, he was reported to have purchased a relatively luxurious apartment in Kiryat Hayovel, Jerusalem, and was scolded by his party for deviating from the modest behavior policy. He was not elected, but remained active in the party secretariat until 13 November 1957.

In 1959 he founded the "New Government" Movement with Shmuel Tamir and Yeshayahu Leibowitz, which sought to undermine Mapai's dominance in Israeli politics, but resigned from the Movement in 1960. Those days also saw the formation of Israel's nuclear policy. Supporters of Israel's nuclear plan, headed by Ben-Gurion along with Shimon Peres and Ernst David Bergmann, acted behind the scenes to promote the program. Against them, Livneh and Leibowitz formed The Committee for Denuclearization of the Middle East. When Israel's nuclear activities were exposed in The New York Times in December 1960, he was joined by several members of the Nuclear Energy Committee, who resigned when Israel's cooperation with France made the Atomic project practical.

The committee argued that Israel's security relies not on the attainment of a nuclear bomb but rather on the nuclear proliferation of the entire region. It was also argued that attaining a nuclear bomb would cause an intensified Arab effort to attain one as well, thus resulting in a balance of terror that might jeopardize the Zionist enterprise. The committee acted behind the scenes and led to a quiet discussion on the issue among several of the members of the big parties, including Levi Eshkol, who replaced Ben-Gurion in 1963, and other party leaders such as Haim-Moshe Shapira of the National Religious Party, Pinchas Rosen of the Liberal party, Yaakov Hazan and Mordechai Bentov of Mapam and Ahdut HaAvoda men Yisrael Galili and Yigal Allon. Allon was particularly attentive to the committee and was considered its loyal supporter in the government. The committee ceased its activities after the Six-Day War. According to Avner Cohen, its term of operation was the closest thing in Israeli history to public democratic debate on nuclear policy.

Prior to the Six Day War, he wrote in Haaretz: "It is more than the Strait of Tiran that is at issue now. What is at issue is the existence or nonexistence of the Jewish people. We must crush the machinations of the new Hitler at the outset, when it is still possible to crush them and survive. ... Neither the world nor the Jews believed in the sincerity of Hitler's declarations. ... Nasser's fundamental strategy is the same as Hitler." After the war, he was one of the founders of the Movement for Greater Israel, in which he was active for the rest of his life. His last book, Israel and the Crisis of Western Civilization promoted a return to original Jewish culture instead of the Western one. His book On the Road to Elon Moreh—Zionism on the path of Emunim was released posthumously by Gush Emunim publishing.

== Published works ==
- The Question of Socialism in our Times (1932) (in Hebrew)
- The New Territorialism (1944) (in Hebrew)
- At the Gateway of an Era (1952) (in Hebrew)
- State and Exile (1953) (in Hebrew)
- Nili—the History of Political Daring (1961) (in Hebrew)
- Aaron Aaronson: the Man and his Times (1969) (in Hebrew)
- Israel and the Crisis of Western Civilization (1971) (in Hebrew)
- On the Road to Elon Moreh—Zionism on the path of Emunim (1976) (in Hebrew)
