= Mohamed Barakatullah Bhopali =

Indian revolutionary

Mohammed Barkatullah Bhopali
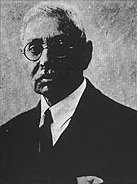

Prime Minister of the Provisional Government of India
- In office 1 December 1915 – 1919
- President: Mahendra Pratap

Personal details
- Born: 7 July 1854 Bhopal, Bhopal State, British India
- Died: 20 September 1927 (aged 73) San Francisco

Mohamed Barakatullah Bhopali, known with his honorific as Maulana Barkatullah (7 July 1854 – 20 September 1927), was an Indian revolutionary from Bhopal. Barkatullah was born on 7 July 1854 at Itawra mohalla, Bhopal in what is today Madhya Pradesh, India. He fought from outside India, with fiery speeches and revolutionary writings in leading newspapers, for the independence of India. He did not live to see India's independence. He died in San Francisco in 1927 and was buried in the Old City Cemetery in Sacramento, California. In 1988, Bhopal University was renamed Barkatullah University in his honour. He was also Prime Minister of the first Provisional Government of India established in Afghanistan in 1915.

== Policy of revolution ==
While in England he came in close contact with Lala Hardayal and Raja Mahendra Pratap, son of the Raja of Hathras. He became a friend of Afghan Emir and the editor of the Kabul newspaper Siraj-ul-Akbar. He was one of the founders of the Ghadar Party in 1913 at San Francisco. Later he became the first prime minister of the Provisional Government of India established on 1 December 1915 in Kabul with Raja Mahendra Pratap as its president.

In England, in 1897, Barakatullah was seen attending meetings of the Muslim Patriotic League. Here, he came across other revolutionary compatriots around Shyamji Krishnavarma. After about a year spent in America, in February 1904 he left for Japan, where he was appointed Professor of Hindustani at the University of Tokyo. In the autumn of 1906, at 1 West 34th Street in New York City, a Pan-Aryan Association was formed by Barakatullah and Samuel Lucas Joshi, a Maratha Christian, son of the late Reverend Lucas Maloba Joshi; it was supported by the Irish revolutionaries of Clan-na-Gael; lawyer Myron H. Phelps; and Swami Abhedananda who continued the work of Swami Vivekananda.

According to a report in the Gaelic American, in June 1907, a meeting of Indians, held in New York, passed resolutions "repudiating the right of any foreigner (Mr. Morley) to dictate the future of the Indian people, urging their countrymen to depend upon themselves alone and especially on boycott and swadeshi, condemning the deportation of Lajpat Rai and Ajit Singh, and expressing detestation of the action of the British authorities in openly instigating one class of Indians against another at Jamalpur and other places." (Source: Ker, p225).

More vehement was his letter in Persian, which appeared in the Urdu Mualla of Aligarh, U.P., in May 1907, in which Barakatullah strongly advocated the necessity for unity between Hindus and Muslims, and defined the two chief duties of Muslims as patriotism and friendship with all Muslims outside India. This prophetic argument preceded by four years the publication of Germany and the Coming War, by Bernhardi, warning England to be aware of the extreme danger represented by the unity of Hindu and Muslim extremists in Bengal, as reported by the Rowlatt Commission (Chapter VII). He thought that the performance of both these duties depended entirely upon one rule of conduct, namely concord and unity with the Hindus of India in all political matters. (Ker, p. 226).

== Activities in Japan ==
In June or July 1911, he left for istanbul and Petrograd, returned to Tokyo in October and published an article referring to the advent of a great pan-Islamic Alliance including Afghanistan which he expected to become "the future Japan of Central Asia". In December he converted to Islam three Japanese: his assistant Hassan Hatanao, his wife, and her father, Baron Kentaro Hiki. This is said to be the first conversion to Islam in Japan. In 1912, Barakatullah "became at once more fluent in his use of the English language and more anti-British in his tone", observes Ker (p. 133).

Meanwhile, since September, copies of another paper called El Islam appeared in India, continuing Barakatullah's political propaganda. On 22 March 1913, its importation was prohibited in India. In June 1913, copies were received in India of a lithographed Urdu pamphlet, "The Sword is the Last Resort". On 31 March 1914, Barakatullah's teaching appointment was terminated by the Japanese authorities. It was followed by another similar leaflet, Feringhi ka Fareb (The Deceit of the English) : according to Ker (p. 135), "it surpassed in violence Barakatullah's previous productions, and was modelled more on the style of the publications of the Ghadar party of San Francisco with whom Barakatullah now threw in his lot".

== The Ghadar episode ==
In May 1913, G. D. Kumar had sailed from San Francisco for the Philippines and had written from Manila to Tarak Nath Das: "I am going to establish base at Manila (P.I.) forwarding Depôt, supervise the work near China, Hong Kong, Shanghai. Professor Barakatullah is all right in Japan". (Ker, p. 237).

On 22 May 1914, Barakatullah returned to San Francisco with Bhagwan Singh (alias Natha Singh), the granthi (priest) of the Sikh temple at Hong Kong and joined the Yugantar Ashram and worked with Tarak Nath Das. With the outbreak of the War in August 1914, meetings were held at all the principal centres of the Indian population from Asia in California and Oregon and funds were raised to go back to India and join the insurrection : Barakatullah, Bhagwan Singh and Ram Chandra Bharadwaj were among the speakers. (Portland (Oregon) Telegram, 7 August 1914; Fresno Republican, 23 September 1914).

Reaching Berlin on time, Barakatullah met Chatto or Virendranath Chattopadhyaya and sided Raja Mahendra Pratap in the Mission to Kabul. Their role was significant in indoctrinating with anti-British feelings the Indian prisoners of war held by Germany. They arrived at Herat on 24 August 1915 and were given a royal reception by the Governor.

== Government of Free India ==
On 1 December 1915, Pratap's 28th birthday, he established the first Provisional Government of India at Kabul in Afghanistan, during First World War. It was a government-in-exile of Free Hindustan with Raja Mahendra Pratap as president, Maulana Barkatullah, Prime Minister, Ubaidullah Sindhi, Home Minister. Anti-British forces supported his movement. But, for some obvious loyalty to the British, the Amir kept on delaying the expedition. Then they attempted to establish relations with foreign powers". (Ker, p. 305).

In Kabul, the Siraj-ul-Akhbar in its issue of 4 May 1916 published Raja Mahendra Pratap's version of the Mission and its objective. He stated: "His Imperial Majesty the Kaiser himself granted me an audience. Subsequently, having set right the problem of India and Asia with the Imperial German Government, and having received the necessary credentials, I started towards the East. I had interviews with the Khedive of Egypt and with the Princes and Ministers of Turkey, as well as with the renowned Enver Pasha and His Imperial Majesty the Holy Khalif, Sultan-ul-Muazzim. I settled the problem of India and the East with the Imperial Ottoman Government, and received the necessary credentials from them as well. German and Turkish officers and Maulvi Barakatullah Sahib were went with me to help me; they are still with me." Unable to take Raja Mahendra Pratap seriously, Jawaharlal Nehru later wrote in An Autobiography (p. 151): "He seemed to be a character out of medieval romance, a Don Quixote who had strayed into the twentieth century."

== Sources ==
- Dictionary of National Biography, ed. S.P. Sen, Vol. I, pp. 139–140
- The Roll of Honour, by Kalicharan Ghosh, 1965
- Sedition Committee Report, by Justice S.A.T. Rowlatt, 1918, Reprint 1973
- Les origines intellectuelles du mouvement d’indépendance de l’Inde (1893–1918), by Prithwindra Mukherjee, PhD Thesis, 1986
- In Freedom’s Quest, by Sibnarayan Ray, Vol. I, 1998
- Communism in India, by Sir Cecil Kaye, compiled & edited by Subodh Roy, 1971
- "The Comintern and the Indian revolutionaries in Russia in 1920s" by Sobhanlal Datta Gupta, in Calcutta Historical Journal, Vol. XVIII, No.2, 1996, pp. 151–170.
