= Mursan =

- town
- Location in Uttar Pradesh, India Mursan (India)
- Coordinates: 27.58°N 77.93°E
- Country: India
- State: Uttar Pradesh
- District: Hathras
- Elevation: 176 m (577 ft)

Population (2011)
  - Total: 13,637

Languages
  - Official: Hindi, English
- Time zone: UTC+5:30 (IST)
- Postal code: 204213
- Vehicle registration: UP-86
- Website: up.gov.in

Mursan is a town and a Nagar Panchayat in Hathras district in the Indian state of Uttar Pradesh. The primary spoken language is a dialect of Hindi, Braj Bhasha, which is closely related to Khariboli. It is the birth place of Indian independence activist and nobel peace prize nominee, Raja Mahendra Pratap Singh.

== Demographics ==
According to the 2011 Census of India, it had a population of 13,637, with 7,302 males and 6,335 females. The literacy rate was 65.73%, with male literacy at 72.49% and female literacy at 57.95%. The sex ratio was 868 females per 1,000 males, and the child sex ratio was 862.

== Notable people ==
- Raja Mahendra Pratap Singh, Indian independence activist, politician, journalist and educationist

== Transport ==
- By Roadways, there is a small government bus stand in Mursan nearby Mursan Police Station.
- By Railways, there is one and only railway station in Mursan Town named as Mursan and station code is MSN.

== Geography ==
Mursan is located at 27.58°N 77.93°E. It has an average elevation of 176 metres (577 ft) and is on the Hathras-Mathura road.

=== Nearby places ===
City	Distance from Mursan town	Direction from Mursan town
Hathras	12 km (7.5 mi)	Towards the east
Raya	16 km (9.9 mi)	Towards the west
Iglas	17 km (11 mi)	Towards the north
Sadabad	21 km (13 mi)	Towards the southeast
Sasni	26 km (16 mi)	Towards the northeast
Mathura	32 km (20 mi)	Towards the west
Aligarh	48 km (30 mi)	Towards the northeast
Agra	55 km (34 mi)	Towards the southeast
