= Raja Mahendra Pratap Singh =

Indian independence activist (1886-1979)

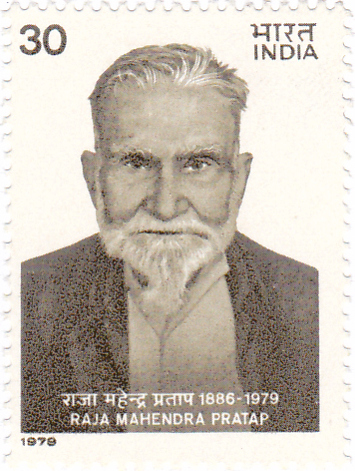
- Mahendra Pratap on a 1979 stamp of India

President of the Provisional Government of India
- In office 1 December 1915 — January 1919

Member of Parliament, Lok Sabha
- In office 1957 — 1962
- Preceded by: Girraj Saran Singh
- Succeeded by: Chaudhary Digambar Singh
- Constituency: Mathura

Personal details
- Born: 1 December 1886 Hathras, North-Western Provinces, British India
- Died: 29 April 1979 (aged 92)
- Party: Independent
- Spouse: Balveer Kaur
- Education: Muhammad Anglo-Oriental Collegiate School

Raja Mahendra Pratap Singh (1 December 1886 – 29 April 1979) was an Indian independence activist, politician, social reformer, and educationist. He was the president of the provisional government of India, established in Kabul in 1915, with the support of Indian nationalists and revolutionaries during World War I. He was nominated for the Nobel Peace Prize in 1932.

Born into the ruling family of Mursan in the Hathras district of the North-Western Provinces (now Uttar Pradesh), Singh was educated at Muhammadan Anglo-Oriental College, which later became Aligarh Muslim University. Singh participated in various nationalist and reform movements and spent several years in self-imposed exile engaged in political activities abroad. Singh also formed the executive board of India in Tokyo, Japan in 1940 during World War II. After India's independence, Singh served as a Member of Parliament representing Mathura in the Lok Sabha from 1957 to 1962. Singh established a number of educational institutions, including Prem Maha Vidyalaya in Vrindavan in 1909. He was popularly known as "Aryan Peshwa".

His legacy was commemorated by the government of India by on 1979 postage stamp of India. In Uttar Pradesh, the Raja Mahendra Pratap Singh University was founded in his honour in 2021.

== Early life, education, and personal life ==
Singh was born on 1 December 1886 in Mursan, Hathras district, North-Western Provinces (now Uttar Pradesh), into a Jat royal family. His father, Raja Ghanshyam Singh, was the ruler of Mursan. At the age of three, he was adopted by Raja Harnarayan Singh of Hathras.

He received his early education at Government High School, Aligarh, and later attended the Muhammadan Anglo-Oriental College (now Aligarh Muslim University). Although he did not complete his degree, his years at Aligarh exposed him to modern political and social ideas that shaped his reformist outlook.

In 1902, while still a student, Singh married Balveer Kaur, a Sikh princess from the princely state of Jind. He was deeply interested in religion, philosophy, and science, and was known for his broad humanist worldview.

== Career ==
Singh began his public life by focusing on educational and social reform. In 1906, he attended a session of the Indian National Congress, after which he became involved in the Indian independence movement.

=== Prem Mahavidyalaya ===
In 1909, Singh established India's first polytechnic college, Prem Mahavidyalaya in Vrindavan, with the dual vision of promoting education and nurturing nationalist thought. During the inauguration of Prem Mahavidyalaya, Madan Mohan Malaviya was also present. Over time, it evolved into an intellectual centre for revolutionary ideas and a meeting place for freedom fighters and Congress leaders.

Prominent figures such as Subhas Chandra Bose, Rabindranath Tagore, Sarojini Naidu, C. F. Andrews, and Jawaharlal Nehru visited the college, leaving their remarks in its visitor book. Mahatma Gandhi spent a day there on 19 April 1915, recording his admiration for Singh's dedication to the national cause. Singh was influenced by the ideas of Dadabhai Naoroji, Bal Gangadhar Tilak, Maharaja of Baroda, and Bipin Chandra Pal, and actively supported the Swadeshi movement and opposed untouchability.

In 1914, Singh left Prem Mahavidyalaya to seek international backing for India's independence, publishing the periodical Nirbal Sevak from Dehradun and travelling through Germany, Bulgaria, Hungary, Turkey, Afghanistan, Russia, and Japan to advocate for the Indian independence movement before returning to India in 1946.

During World War I, Singh became involved in international anti-colonial activism. In 1914–1915, he travelled to Europe and Asia to seek support for India's independence from the British Raj.

=== Provisional government of India ===
Mahendra Pratap (centre), President of the Provisional Government of India, at the head of the mission with the German and Turkish delegates in Kabul, 1915. Seated to his right is Werner Otto von Hentig.

On 1 December 1915, in Bagh-e Babur, Kabul, Singh established the provisional government of India, a government-in-exile intended to secure international assistance against British rule. Singh served as president, while Maulana Barkatullah as prime minister in the provisional government of India. The government operated from Afghanistan and sought diplomatic and military support, though it did not gain official recognition from the Afghan ruler. This initiative is considered one of the earliest attempts by Indians to assert sovereignty outside the subcontinent.

Following the Kabul mission, Singh spent several decades abroad, engaging in diplomatic and activist work across Europe and Asia. He met various leaders, including Kaiser Wilhelm II in Germany and Bolshevik leaders in Russia.

Singh's efforts in establishing the provisional government of India in Kabul (1915) received recognition from various leaders in the Indian independence movement. Mahatma Gandhi acknowledged Singh's contributions in a series of letters exchanged between them. Gandhi stated that Singh held a "special place" in his regard from 1915 and noted that he had been aware of the Hindu Jat leader since his time in South Africa. In his correspondence, Gandhi described Singh's dedication and patriotism as commendable.

=== Nomination for Nobel peace prize ===
In 1929, Singh founded the World Federation, a platform promoting international cooperation, peace, and anti-imperial advocacy. In 1929, Singh donated 3.05 acres of land to Aligarh Muslim University for its expansion and development. In 1932, he was nominated for the Nobel Peace Prize by Swedish activist N. A. Nilsson for his contributions to international dialogue and anti-colonial activism.

During World War II, in 1940, Singh established the executive board of India in Tokyo, Japan. The organisation aimed to unite Indian nationalists abroad and coordinate efforts to secure support from the Axis powers for India's independence.

=== Indian politics ===
After more than three decades abroad, Singh returned to India in 1946, shortly before independence. In the 1957 Indian general elections, he was elected as an independent Member of Parliament from Mathura, in the Lok Sabha, defeating Atal Bihari Vajpayee of the Bharatiya Jana Sangh.

On 22 November 1957, Singh moved a bill in Lok Sabha to recognise the service of people like, Vinayak Damodar Savarkar, Barindra Kumar Ghosh, and Bhupendranath Datta. The bill was defeated, with 48 votes favouring it, and 75 against it. He, along with other members walked out of the Lok Sabha saying "I hope every Bengali and every Maratha will also walk out".

== Electoral history ==
1957 Indian general election: Mathura
Party	Candidate	Votes	%	±%
Independent	Raja Mahendra Pratap	95,202	40.68	
INC	Chaudhary Digambar Singh	69,209	29.57	
Independent	Pooran	29,177		
ABJS	Atal Bihari Vajpayee	23,620	10.09	

== Legacy ==
Singh was known for establishing the provisional government of India in Kabul in 1915, which aimed to secure international support for India's independence. Beyond his political activities, he promoted education by founding schools and colleges such as Prem Mahavidyalaya, supporting technical and vocational training, and donating land for educational purposes for Aligarh Muslim University (AMU).

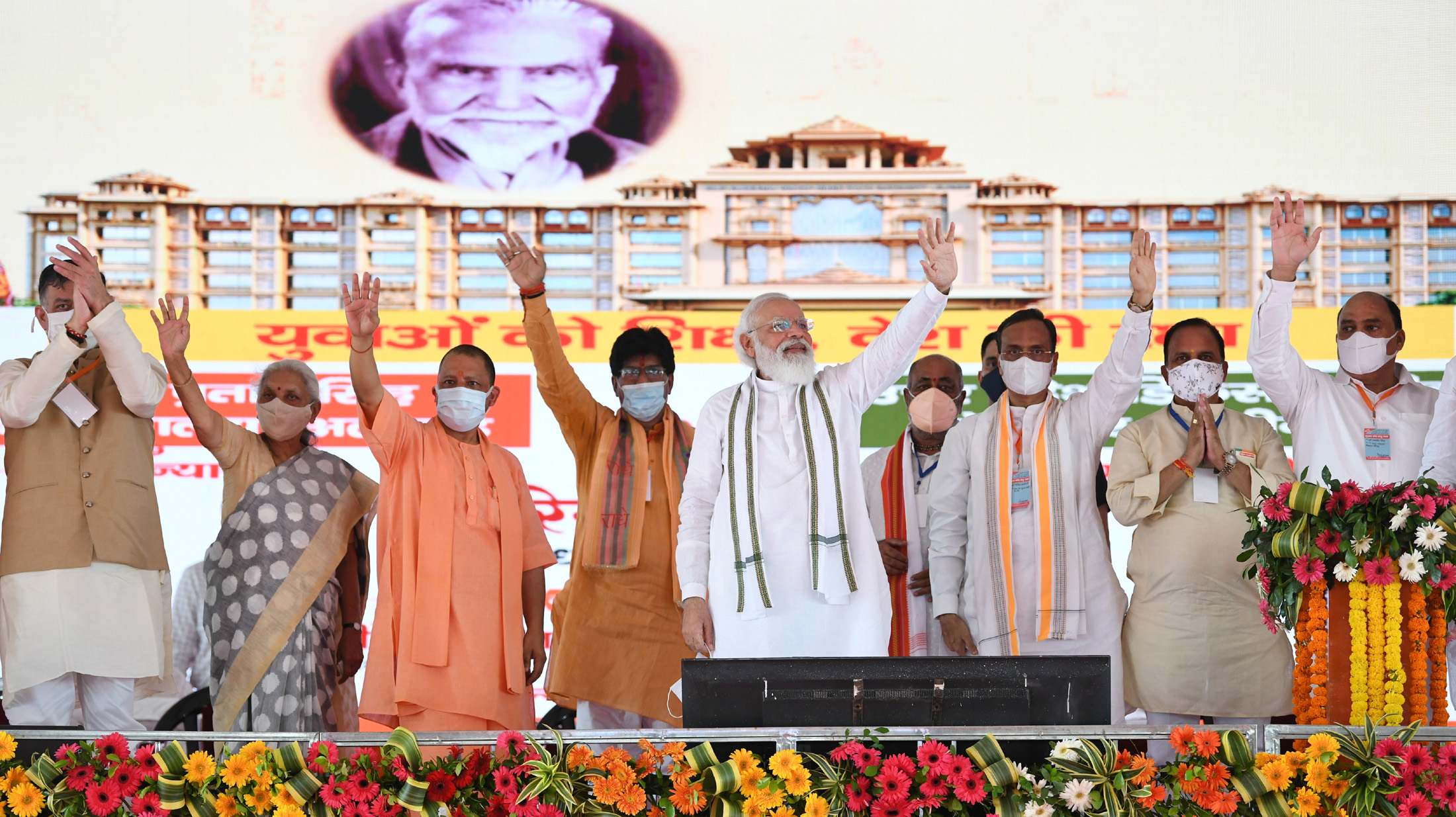
The Prime Minister, Shri Narendra Modi at the foundation stone laying ceremony of Raja Mahendra Pratap Singh University with Chief Minister Yogi Adityanath

He was a prolific writer and thinker, advocating social harmony through his ethical-spiritual concept of "Prem-Dharam". In recognition of his contributions, the Government of India issued a commemorative postage stamp in 1979. His legacy is further honoured through the Raja Mahendra Pratap Singh University, established in 2021 in Aligarh, Uttar Pradesh, which serves as a state university and affiliates colleges in the region.
