= Haavara =

Haavara Ltd. was a company founded as a result of the Haavara Agreement made during the Nazi regime's control over Germany. The company facilitated the emigration of approximately 50,000 Jews from Germany to Palestine.

The Trust and Transfer Office Haavara Ltd. was established in Tel Aviv following an agreement with the German government in August 1933 to facilitate Jewish emigration to Palestine by enabling the transfer of assets through German export goods. The Haavara Agreement reflected tensions between efforts to rescue German Jews and broader Jewish-led boycotts of German goods intended to oppose the Nazi regime.

== See also ==
- Haavara Agreement
