= Werner Otto von Hentig =

German diplomat

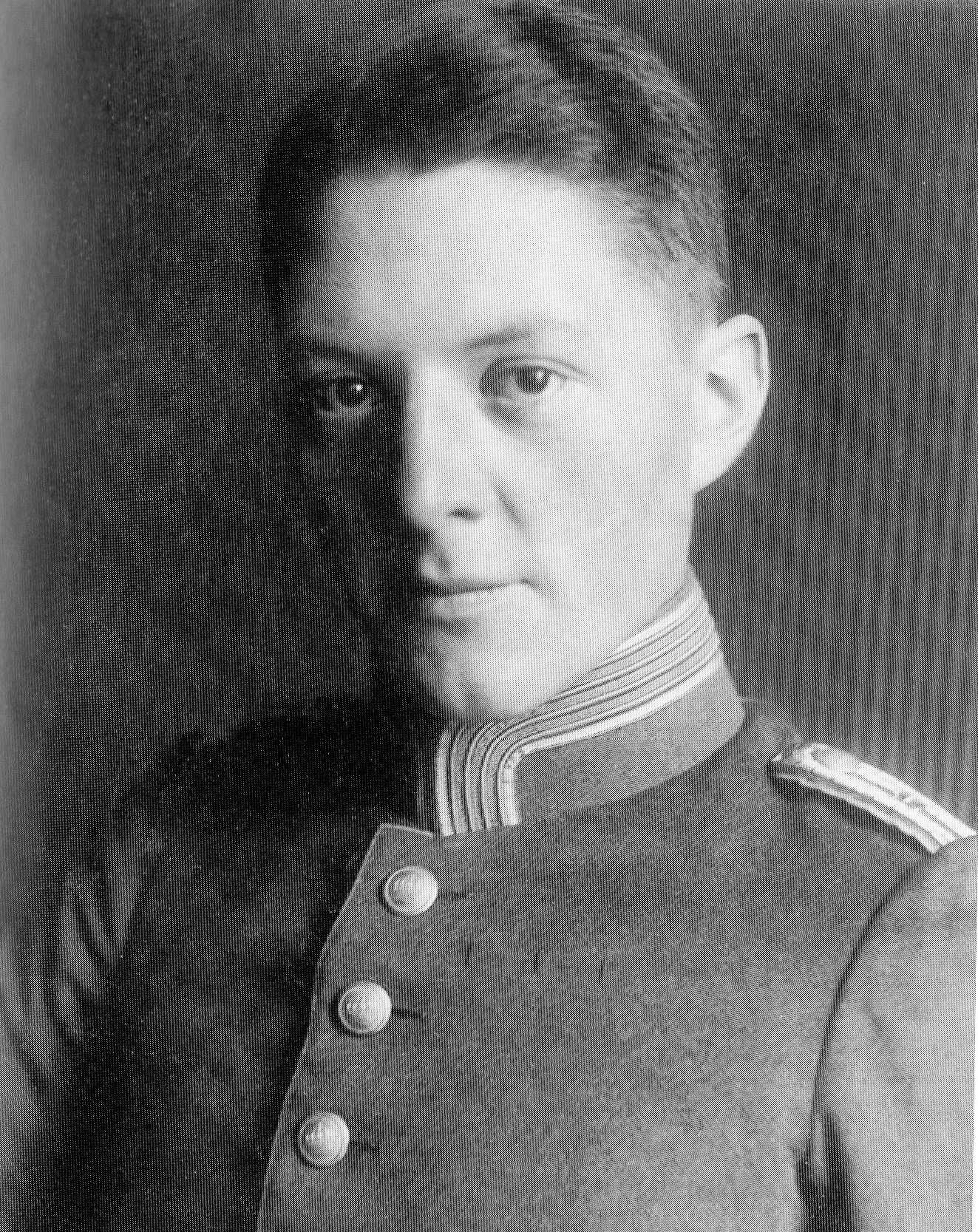
Werner Otto von Hentig

Werner Otto von Hentig (22 May 1886, Berlin, Germany – 8 August 1984, Lindesnes, Norway) was a German Army Officer, adventurer and diplomat from Berlin. When still only a 25 year old lieutenant he was commissioned by the Kaiser to lead an expedition into the unknown and uncharted territories of Central Asia. The region associated with the political "Great Game" had its roots in Victorian rivalries between the local Great Powers: Russia and Britain. The small expedition party, travelling in extreme climatic conditions, suffered extraordinary privations with courage and equanimity. Surviving diary accounts of participants on both sides of the Great War bear witness to the unusual camaraderie and esprit de corps summoned by Hentig's outstanding qualities of leadership.

Hentig was the elder brother of the criminal psychologist Hans von Hentig and the father of education scientist Hartmut von Hentig (born 1925). Though critical of the Nazi regime, he served in the Third Reich and intervened at personal risk to save Jews who were in danger, and was instrumental in arranging for thousands of Jews to be transferred from Germany to Palestine during the 1930s.

Hentig joined the Imperial German diplomatic service in 1909 and was posted as an attaché to the German mission at Beijing. He was later posted to Istanbul and Tehran. During the First World War he was wounded in the Battle of the Masurian Lakes, then later in 1915, with Oskar Niedermayer, led the Niedermayer–Hentig Expedition, a German mission to Kabul that sought to enlist the Afghan Amir's support for the Central Powers and an attack on British India.

At the end of the war, Hentig was attached to the embassy at Istanbul, before becoming active in repatriation of German prisoners of war from Siberia. In 1924, he was appointed the ambassador to Poznań. In the 1920s, Hentig became involved in the German Youth Movement. In the 1930s, he was appointed the German Consul General to San Francisco and later Bogotá when in 1935, attempts were made to assassinate him.

Nora Levin writes in The Holocaust about Hentig's actions during 1937 and 1938, when the rate of Jewish emigration from Germany to Palestine was being restricted by a combination of British obstructions (in response to Arab uprisings in Mandatory Palestine that opposed giving asylum to European Jews) and a change in German policy concerning the German Jewish contribution to the potential establishment of a Jewish State:

The Palestine Desk in the Wilhelmstrasse at this time (1937-38) was held by Werner Otto von Hentig, a critic of the Nazi regime, but a man whose foreign service expertise could not be ignored or wasted. Hentig had already dealt with the Palestine problem in Constantinople [now Istanbul].... In Berlin, he had often seen and heard Chaim Weizmann and had been deeply impressed by him. He was also attracted to the daring of the Zionist experiment. Hentig advised Ernst Marcus, who was employed by the Paltreu Company [Palästina Treuhandstelle, Palestine Trustee Office], a subsidiary of the Haavara Company, to prepare material proving that the contribution of the German Jews to the upbuilding of Palestine was small as compared with the share of Polish Jews and the financial contribution of American Jews. Marcus prepared such a memorandum, which served as the basis for a brief, arguing that there were certain advantages to Germany in the establishment of a Jewish State. Other divisions within the Foreign Ministry, however, submitted negative recommendations. Several months passed .... A short time before the Mossad emissary, Auerbach, arrived in Vienna, Hentig phoned Marcus to tell him that Hitler at last had made a favorable decision and that all obstacles in the way of emigration to Palestine were now removed

Although Hentig was overly optimistic about the removal of all obstacles, especially the British opposition to unlimited Jewish immigration into Palestine, the actions he initiated enabled Auerbach to negotiate with Eichmann for (at first) a thousand Jewish boys and girls to be trained in preparation for emigration to Palestine. Although Eichmann had wanted the training and emigration to be handled by the Gestapo, Auerbach found confederates (Note: e.g. Signor Metossiani, an engineer named Karthaus, a young Palestinian Jew named Zvi Yehieli, and others) who used the opportunity to obtain 20,000 transit visas that could theoretically enable Jewish migration to Yugoslavia. Although the actual numbers saved from later being sent to concentration camps were fewer than 20,000, various efforts enabled many small groups in bunches of hundreds to find passage on several different vessels departing Yugoslav and Grecian ports. Although there were a variety of putative destinations, (Note: e.g. Mexico,) after a series of adventures and mishaps, many of these Jewish refugees eventually arrived safely in Palestine. These arrangements were continued until the British took strong action to stop such rescue operations.

After the Nazi Kristallnacht in Germany, November 1938:

Hentig ... expressed his shame, and willingly used his influence, at great personal risk, to protest a fresh action from starting.... Hentig interceded with Under-Secretary of State Ernst von Weizsäcker, pointing out the detrimental effects of the riots on German foreign policy.... Hentig ... did secure the release of ... arrested ... Jewish functionaries from concentration camps.

As the Middle East historian Wolfgang G. Schwanitz of New Jersey proved in his research, Hentig did cultivate a bitter rivalry with another leading German envoy to the Middle East, Dr. Fritz Grobba, because they did not share the same ideological opinions. This shaped the German Middle Eastern policy: Hentig obstructed the expansion of the Second World War to the Middle East. Whereas Grobba, an ardent Nazi, belonged in both world wars to the Foreign Office faction that favoured the massive incitement of Muslims to jihad in the British and French colonial empires and the Soviet Union, Hentig and Niedermayer rejected it. During the First World War they both underwent a professional transformation in the German officer corps, and nationalist ideas spreading across the region played a part in the conduct of Hentig's secret mission to Kabul, Afghanistan; the Turkish declaration of war escalated racial tensions among the Ottoman-German conspiracy, seeking to launch a Holy War to counter the so-called Allied powers.

Late in 1940, Lehi representative Naftali Lubenchik went to Beirut to meet Hentig. To Hentig's surprise, Lehi proposed the creation of an anti-British alliance with Nazi Germany, in exchange for a fascist Jewish state. Lubenchik Jewish state would be ruled in a very similar manner as Germany's dictatorship. Hentig requested that the offer be put in writing, after which he delivered the proposal to the Foreign Office in Berlin. No reply was ever made.

Between September 1941 and October 1942, Hentig served as the Foreign Office's liaison officer to the 11th Army High Command in Ukraine, where he repeatedly protested against the massacres committed by Einsatzgruppe D. As with other critical German officers, such protest could be voiced only by citing negative effects on the war economy, Germany's reputation, relations with the local population, and troop morale. However, Hentig did denounce the killings as "murder" (Judenermordung) and "butchery" (Schlächterei).

Some years after World War II, Hentig served as the West German ambassador to Indonesia. In retirement he was a personal advisor to the Saudi royal family for nearly two years.

In 1961, Hentig, along with Bogislaw von Bonin, Herman Schwann, Wolf Schenke, and Theodor Kogler, was one of the founders of the Association of German National Assembly.

He died on 8 August 1984 in Lindesnes, Norway, aged 98.

== See also ==
- Niedermayer–Hentig Expedition

== Notes ==
=== References ===
Secondary sources

- Schwanitz, Wolfgang G. (2007). "Germany's Middle Eastern Policy" (PDF). Middle East Review of International Affairs. 11 (3): 26–41. ISSN 1565-8996. Archived from the original (PDF) on 26 November 2008.
- Hopkirk, Peter (1994). The Great Game: The Struggle for Empire in Central Asia. New York: Kodansha. ISBN 978-1-56836-022-5.
- Seidt, Hans-Ulrich (2001). "From Palestine to the Caucasus-Oskar Niedermayer and Germany's Middle Eastern Strategy in 1918". German Studies Review. 24 (1). German Studies Association: 1–18. doi:10.2307/1433153. ISSN 0149-7952. JSTOR 1433153.
- Hughes, Thomas L. (2002). "The German Mission to Afghanistan, 1915–1916". German Studies Review. 25 (3). German Studies Association: 447–476. doi:10.2307/1432596. ISSN 0149-7952. JSTOR 1432596.
