= Mai (village) =

Village in Hathras district of UP State in India

Mai is a village in Sadabad Block in Mahamaya Nagar District of Uttar Pradesh State, India. It belongs to Aligarh Division. It is located 40 km towards the South of the District headquarters Hathras and 16 km from Sadabad. 350 km from the State capital Lucknow. Mai Pin code is 281306 and the postal head office is Sadabad. Chirawali (1 km), Saroth (2 km), Ghooncha (2 km), Nanau (3 km), Garhumrao (3 km), Nagla Banarasi (1 km) are the nearby Villages to Mai. Mai is surrounded by Khandauli Block towards the East, Baldeo Block towards the west, Agra Block towards the South, and Sehpau Block towards the East.

Sadabad, Agra, and Hathras are the nearby Cities to Mai.

This Place is on the border of the Mahamaya Nagar District and Agra District. Agra District Khandauli is East towards this place . Also it is in the Border of another district Mathura

Mai Pin code and STD code are 281302 and 056660 It falls in the Hathras district. The main spoken language is Hindi

== Geography and climate ==
Mai is located at latitude 27.6056212 and longitude 78.0537813. It is at an altitude of 172 meters above sea level.
Time zone: IST (UTC+5:30).

Annual temperatures fluctuate between a peak of 47.6 °C (117.68 °F) in May and a minimum of 2.2 °C (35.96 °F) in January. The majority of rainfall is concentrated during the monsoon season from June to September, although some precipitation also occurs in January and February.

== Demographics ==
The total Population of Mai village as per 2011 census is 2895 of which 1559 are males and 1336 are females.
Hindi is the local language. This village is part of the Braj region, it is located in Sadabad Tehsil, in Aligarh Division.Nearby village are Saroth, Ghooncha, Abhaipura, Chirawali, Nagla Banarasi, and Naupura.

Area - 3.16 km^{2}

Population (2020) - 4447

Population Density - 1564 people per km^{2}

Male Population - 2395

Female Population - 2052

Nearest airport & distanceAgra Airport - 18.94 km

Nearest Railway Station & DistanceRunkuta - 14.2 km

== Local government ==
Mai falls in the Hathras Parliamentary constituency and Sadabad assembly constituency.

BSP, BJP, SP, and RLD are the major political parties in this area.

The present MP of the area is Rajesh Kumar Diwakar and Present MLA is Pradeep Kumar Singh and former is Ramveer Upadhyay(from 2017 to 2022).

== Agriculture ==
The village is a large producer of potatoes and the area around of village is one of India's largest producers of potatoes.

Other crops which are sown by peoples are pearl millet, wheat, and the chari (kind of grass used for animal grazing)

== College and Education ==
Every village near Mai has primary schools. Government high school, Mai is the oldest school in the village. Also, Primary School And Upper Primary School are located in Naupura, Nagla Banarasi, Sarauth. For High Education, Captain Pyarelal Inter college and Captain Pyarelal ITI is located in the neighbouring village.

== Religions ==
Peoples follows Hinduism and Muslism as their religion and majority is of Hinduism.
Temples in Village
1-Baljati Baba Temple
Naupura;; Uttar Pradesh 281302; India
1.7 km distance
2-Ataki Maa mandir
Kursanda; Uttar Pradesh 281306; India
6.9 km distance
3-Pachawari Ram Mandir
Pachawari; Uttar Pradesh; India
7.0 km distance
4-Shiv Mandir
Semra; Uttar Pradesh; India
11.1 km distance
