= National Highway 530B (India) =

National Highway in India

National Highway 530B

Route information
- Auxiliary route of NH 30
- Length: 265 km (165 mi)

Major junctions
- North end: Bareilly
- South end: Mathura

Location
- Country: India
- States: Uttar Pradesh
- Primary destinations: Budaun, Kasganj, Hathras

Highway system
- Roads in India; Expressways; National; State; Asian
← NH 530	→ NH 531

National Highway 530B, commonly referred to as NH 530B is a national highway in India. It is a secondary route of National Highway 30. NH-530B runs completely in the state of Uttar Pradesh in India. The Highway was Notified on 06 Mar 2018, prior to which, it was a part of UP State Highway 33.

== Route ==
NH530B connects Bareilly, Budaun, Kasganj, Hathras and Mathura in the state of Uttar Pradesh.

== Junctions ==
NH 30 Terminal near Bareilly.
NH 34 at Sikandra Rao.
NH 509 at Hathras.
Yamuna Expressway near Raya.
NH 44 Terminal at Mathura.

== See also ==
- List of national highways in India
- List of national highways in India by state
