= Hathras Lok Sabha constituency =

Lok Sabha Constituency in Uttar Pradesh, India

Coordinates: 27.6°N 78.05°E

Hathras UP-16
- Lok Sabha constituency
- Interactive Map Outlining Hathras Lok Sabha constituency

Constituency details
- Country: India
- Region: North India
- State: Uttar Pradesh
- Assembly constituencies: Chharra; Iglas; Hathras; Sadabad; Sikandra Rao
- Established: 1962
- Total electors: 19,37,926
- Reservation: SC

Member of Parliament
- 18th Lok Sabha
- Incumbent Anoop Pradhan
- Party: BJP
- Alliance: NDA
- Elected year: 2024

Hathras (Hindi pronunciation: [ɦaːt̪ʰ.ɾəs]) is a Lok Sabha parliamentary constituency in Uttar Pradesh.

== Assembly segments ==
The Hathras Lok Sabha constituency comprises 5 legislative assembly segments:

No	Name	District	Member	Party	2024 Lead
74	Chharra	Aligarh	Ravendra Pal Singh	BJP	BJP
77	Iglas (SC)	Aligarh	Rajkumar Sahyogi	BJP	BJP
78	Hathras (SC)	Hathras	Anjula Singh Mahaur	BJP	BJP
79	Sadabad	Hathras	Pradeep Kumar Singh	RLD	BJP
80	Sikandra Rao	Hathras	Birendra Singh Rana	BJP	BJP

== Members of Parliament ==
Year	Member	Party
1962	Nardeo Snatak	Indian National Congress
1962	Joti Saroop	Republican Party of India
1967	Nardeo Snatak	Indian National Congress
1971	Chandra Pal Shailani	Indian National Congress
1977	Ram Prasad Deshmukh	Janata Party
1980	Chandra Pal Shailani	Janata Party
1984	Puran Chand	Indian National Congress
1989	Bangali Singh	Janata Dal
1991	Lal Bahadur Rawal	Bharatiya Janata Party
1996	Kishan Lal Diler	Bharatiya Janata Party
1998	Kishan Lal Diler	Bharatiya Janata Party
1999	Kishan Lal Diler	Bharatiya Janata Party
2004	Kishan Lal Diler	Bharatiya Janata Party
2009	Sarika Baghel	Rashtriya Lok Dal
2014	Rajesh Diwakar	Bharatiya Janata Party
2019	Rajvir Singh Diller	Bharatiya Janata Party
2024	Anoop Pradhan	Bharatiya Janata Party

== Election results ==
=== General Election 2024 ===
2024 Indian general election: Hathras
Party	Candidate	Votes	%	±%
BJP	Anoop Pradhan	554,746	51.24	▼8.25
SP	Jasveer Valmiki	3,07,428	28.39	▼8.48
BSP	Hembaboo Dhangar	2,01,263	18.59	▲18.59
NOTA	None of the above	6,299	0.58	▼0.16
Majority		2,47,318	22.84	▲0.22
Turnout		10,82,720	55.87	▼5.89
BJP hold		Swing		

=== 2019 ===
2019 Indian general elections: Hathras
Party	Candidate	Votes	%	±%
BJP	Rajvir Singh Diler	684,299	59.49	
SP	Ram Ji Lal Suman	4,24,091	36.87	
INC	Triloki Ram	23,926	2.08	
NOTA	None of the Above	8,568	0.74	
Margin of victory		2,60,208	22.62	
Turnout		11,51,461	61.76	
BJP hold		Swing		

=== 2014 ===
2014 Indian general elections: Hathras
Party	Candidate	Votes	%	±%
BJP	Rajesh Kumar Diwakar	544,277	51.87	+51.87
BSP	Manoj Kumar Soni	2,17,891	20.77	−11.78
SP	Ramji Lal Suman	1,80,891	17.24	−0.52
RLD	Niranjan Singh Dhangar	86,109	8.21	−30.02
AAP	Sunhari Lal	5,043	0.48	+0.48
NOTA	None of the Above	5,669	0.54	+0.54
Margin of victory		3,26,386	31.10	+25.42
Turnout		10,49,289	59.66	+14.56
BJP gain from RLD		Swing	+13.64	

== See also ==
- Hathras
- List of constituencies of the Lok Sabha
