= National Highway 509 (India) =

National highway in India

National Highway 509
- Map of National Highway 509 in red

Route information
- Length: 239 km (149 mi)

Major junctions
- From: Moradabad
- To: Agra

Location
- Country: India
- States: Uttar Pradesh: 220 km (140 mi)
- Primary destinations: Chandausi- Babrala-Dibai – Aligarh – Hathras

Highway system
- Roads in India; Expressways; National; State; Asian
← NH 9	→ NH 2

National Highway 509 (NH 509) is a National Highway in India entirely within the state of Uttar Pradesh. NH 509 links Agra with Moradabad and runs for a distance of 239 km (149 mi).

== Route ==
- Sadabad
- Hathras
- Sasni
- Aligarh
- Dibai
- Babrala
- Bahjoi
- Chandausi

 Pandrawal

== See also ==
- List of national highways in India
- National Highways Development Project
