= Hari Shankar Mahor =

Indian politician

MLA of Hathras
- President: Ram Nath Kovind
- Prime Minister: Narendra Modi

Personal details
- Born: 3 July 1956 (age 70) Kasganj, Uttar Pradesh, India
- Citizenship: Indian
- Party: Bhartiya Janata Party
- Spouse: Kusum lata Mahor
- Parent: Sri Ramchandra Mahor (father)
- Education: Shri Varshney College Aligarh, Agra University
- Profession: Advocate

Hari Shankar Mahor is an Indian politician and member of the Legislative Assembly (MLA) belonging to the Bharatiya Janata Party. He is from Hathras of Uttar Pradesh, India.

== Early life and political career ==
Hari Shankar Mahor was born in a Koli family in 1956 of Hathras, in the state of Uttar Pradesh. He earned his Master of Arts degree in Hathras and earned a Bachelor of Laws from the Varshney College in Aligarh. In 1989, he joined BJP and, with the support of Kalyan Singh, became an MLA in 1991, after getting a BJP ticket from the Sasni state legislative assembly (Vidhan Sabha) of the district. He won elections from the seat in 1993 and 1996. After his elections, he left BJP and joined various other parties but eventually returned to BJP. In the 2017 elections, the party contested him for the Hathras seat, and he won with a great margin. This victory also breaks the 20 year streak of BSP rule. Mahor was jailed for eight and a half months for the demolition of the mosque in Hathras. He has constructed interlocking roads in his area in four years with his MLA fund.
