= Sadabad Assembly constituency =

Constituency of the Uttar Pradesh legislative assembly in India

Sadabad
- Constituency No. 79 for the Uttar Pradesh Legislative Assembly

Constituency details
- Country: India
- Region: North India
- State: Uttar Pradesh
- District: Hathras
- Total electors: 240,779 (2022)
- Reservation: None

Member of Legislative Assembly
- 18th Uttar Pradesh Legislative Assembly
- Incumbent Pradeep Kumar Singh
- Party: RLD
- Alliance: NDA
- Elected year: 2022

Sadabad Assembly constituency is one of the 403 constituencies of the Uttar Pradesh Legislative Assembly, India. It is a part of the Hathras district and one of the five assembly constituencies in the Hathras Lok Sabha constituency. First election in this assembly constituency was held in 1952 after the "DPACO (1951)" (delimitation order) was passed in 1951. After the Delimitation of Parliamentary and Assembly Constituencies Order was passed in 2008, the constituency was assigned identification number 79.

== Members of the Legislative Assembly ==
From	Term	Name	Party
1952	01st Vidhan Sabha	Ashraf Ali Khan	Indian National Congress
1957	02nd Vidhan Sabha	Tika Ram	Independent
1962	03rd Vidhan Sabha	Kunwar Mohammad Ashraf Ali Khan	Indian National Congress
1967	04th Vidhan Sabha	Kunwar Mohammad Ashraf Ali Khan	Indian National Congress
1969	05th Vidhan Sabha	Kunwar Mohammad Ashraf Ali Khan	Indian National Congress
1974	06th Vidhan Sabha	Ram Prakash	Bharatiya Kranti Dal
1977	07th Vidhan Sabha	H. C. Tiwari	Janata Party
1980	08th Vidhan Sabha	Kunwar Javed Ali	Indian National Congress (I)
1985	09th Vidhan Sabha	Kunwar Mustemand Ali Khan	Lok Dal
1989	10th Vidhan Sabha	Kunwar Mustemand Ali Khan	Janata Dal
1991	11th Vidhan Sabha	Vijendra Singh	Bharatiya Janata Party
1993	12th Vidhan Sabha	Vishambhar Singh	Janata Dal
1996	13th Vidhan Sabha	Vishambhar Singh	Bharatiya Janata Party
2002	14th Vidhan Sabha	Chaudhary Pratap Singh	Rashtriya Lok Dal
2007	15th Vidhan Sabha	Anil Chaudhary	Rashtriya Lok Dal
2012	16th Vidhan Sabha	Devendra Agrawal	Samajwadi Party
2017	17th Vidhan Sabha	Ramveer Upadhyay	Bahujan Samaj Party
2022	18th Vidhan Sabha	Pradeep Kumar Singh	Rashtriya Lok Dal

== Election results ==
=== 2027 ===
2027 Uttar Pradesh Legislative Assembly election: Sadabad
Party	Candidate	Votes	%	±%
INDIA				
NDA				
BSP	Avin Sharma			
NOTA	None of the above			
Majority				
Turnout				
gain from		Swing		

=== 2022 ===
2022 Uttar Pradesh Legislative Assembly election: Sadabad
Party	Candidate	Votes	%	±%
RLD	Pradeep Kumar Singh	104,874	43.25	▲14.67
BJP	Ramveer Upadhyay	98,437	40.6	▲24.66
BSP	Avin Sharma	32,555	13.43	▼26.88
INC	Mathura Prasad	2,788	1.15	
NOTA	None of the above	976	0.4	▼0.09
Majority		6,437	2.65	▼9.08
Turnout		242,482	64.32	▼1.29
RLD gain from BSP		Swing	2.65	

=== 2017 ===
2017 Uttar Pradesh Legislative Assembly Election: Sadabad
Party	Candidate	Votes	%	±%
BSP	Ramveer Upadhyay	91,365	40.31	
RLD	Anil Chaudhary	64,775	28.58	
BJP	Pritee Chaudhary	36,134	15.94	
SP	Devendra Agrawal	29,060	12.82	
NOTA	None of the above	1,103	0.49	
Majority		26,590	11.73	
Turnout		226,634	65.61	

=== 2012 ===
2012 General Elections: Sadabad
Party	Candidate	Votes	%	±%
SP	Devendra Agrawal	63,741	33.84	–
BSP	Satendra Sharma	58,554	31.09	–
RLD	Chaudhary Pratap Singh	51,247	27.21	–
	Remainder 11 candidates	14,801	7.86	–
Majority		5,187	2.75	–
Turnout		188,343	60.54	–
SP gain from RLD		Swing		

== See also ==
- Hathras district
- Hathras Lok Sabha constituency
- Sixteenth Legislative Assembly of Uttar Pradesh
- Uttar Pradesh Legislative Assembly
