= Narayanpur Bad =

- Village
- Location in Uttar Pradesh, India Narayanpur Bad (India)
- Coordinates: 27.501°N 78.098°E
- Country: India
- State: Uttar Pradesh
- District: Hathras

Government
  - Body: Village
- Elevation: 174 m (571 ft)

Population (2011)
  - Total: 917

Languages
  - Official: Hindi
- Time zone: UTC+5:30 (IST)
- PIN: 281307
- Vehicle registration: UP-86

Narayanpur Bad is a village in Uttar Pradesh, India. It comes under the Hasanpur Baru gram panchayat. The village is located in the Sadabad block of in Hathras district, 2 km north of Hasanpur Baru.
