= Hasanpur Baru =

- Village
- Nickname: Baru
- Location in Uttar Pradesh, India Hasanpur Baru (India)
- Coordinates: 27.30°N 78.05°E
- Country: India
- State: Uttar Pradesh
- District: Hathras

Government
  - Type: Village, (Gram Panchayat)
  - Gram Pradhan: Ramsevak(Ramveer)
- Elevation: 175 m (574 ft)

Population (2011)
  - Total: 2,073

Languages
  - Official: Hindi
- Time zone: UTC+5:30 (IST)
- PIN: 281307
- Telephone code: 05661
- Vehicle registration: UP-86
- Website: www.hpbaru.com

Hasanpur Baru is a Village and a Gram Panchayat in Hathras district in the Indian state of Uttar Pradesh. A part of the Braj region, it is located in Sadabad Tehsil, in Aligarh Division.

== History ==
"Hasanpur Baru" is a Gram Panchayat. It has two sub-villages, Narayanpur Bad and Baljit Garhi.

== Education ==
Hasanpur Baru has some schools and a college. Shri Maharana Pratap JHS is the oldest school in the village. Also Primary School And Upper Primary School are located in Hasanpur Baru. For High Education, Shri Gandhi Inter College is located in the neighbouring village Mangru.

== Demographics ==
According to 2011 census of India, Hasanpur Baru has a population of 2,073. This includes 1079 males and 994 females.

== Geography ==
Hasanpur Baru is located at 27.30°N 78.05°E.It is located in Hathres District of state Uttar Pradesh in Republic of India.

Name of Cities	Distance from Hasanpur Baru Village	Direction from Hasanpur Baru Village
Sadabad	11 km	Towards South
Mathura	46 km	Towards West
Hathras	12 km	Towards North
Agra	50 km	Towards South
