= Rudayan, Hathras =

Village in Uttar Pradesh, India

Rudayan is a village in Hathras district in the Indian state of Uttar Pradesh. It lies near the town of Sasni. Most of the villagers are dependent on agriculture.

This agricultural village had a great role in India's freedom struggle. One of the prominent freedom fighters, Nand Kumar Deo Vashistha, who later became a member of the Legislative Assembly of Hathras, hailed from Rudayan.

The village, has only a single government tube well for irrigation which is insufficient. There are also improper electricity, healthcare facilities, sanitation and waste disposal facilities and a low income for farmers.
