= Mansya Kalan =

- Village
- Location in Uttar Pradesh, India Mansya Kalan (India)
- Coordinates: 27°25′31.9″N 78°00′24.6″E
- Country: India
- State: Uttar Pradesh
- District: Hathras

Government
  - Type: Village

Languages
  - Official: Hindi
- Time zone: UTC+5:30 (IST)

Mansya Kalan is a Gram Panchayat located in the Hathras district of Uttar Pradesh, India. As a Gram Panchayat, it functions as the smallest unit of local self-government in rural India, where local administration is carried out by elected representatives at the village level.

== Geographic Location ==
Mansya Kalan is situated in the Hathras district, which is part of the Agra division in the state of Uttar Pradesh. Hathras is a district known for its agricultural economy, traditional industries, and is part of the Braj region, an area culturally rich due to its association with Lord Krishna. The village of Mansya Kalan is part of the rural landscape of this region and comes under the jurisdiction of the Hathras district administration.

=== Demographics and Economy ===
The population of Mansya Kalan is predominantly rural, composed of agricultural workers, small farmers, and other villagers. The overall population will be part of the census data collection carried out by the government. Gram Panchayats generally have small populations ranging from a few hundred to a couple of thousand people.

Total living area: 147,975.52 m^{2} (1,592,795.27 ft²) Total perimeter : 2.61 km (1.62 mi)

The economy is primarily agrarian, with a large part of the population engaged in farming, cultivation, and related activities. Like much of Uttar Pradesh, Mansya Kalan likely produces staples such as wheat, rice, pulses, and other crops. and Hindi is the official and most widely spoken language.
