= Baljit Garhi =

- Village
- Nickname: Garhi
- Location in Uttar Pradesh, India Baljit Garhi (India)
- Coordinates: 27.50°N 78.09°E
- Country: India
- State: Uttar Pradesh
- District: Hathras
- Established: 1800
- Founded by: Lt. Thakur Baba Baljit Singh Sisodiya

Government
  - Type: Village
  - Gram Pradhan: Ramveer Singh
- Elevation: 150 m (490 ft)

Population
  - Total: 1,405

Languages
  - Official: Hindi
- Time zone: UTC+5:30 (IST)
- PIN: 281307
- Telephone code: 05661
- Vehicle registration: UP-86

Baljit Garhi is a village in Hasanpur Baru Gram Panchayat, Sadabad Tahsil in Hathras district of Uttar Pradesh state, India.
