= Rajvir Singh Diler =

Indian politician (1958–2024)

Member of the India Parliament for Hathras
- In office 2019 – 24 April 2024
- Preceded by: Rajesh Diwakar
- Succeeded by: Anoop Pradhan
- Constituency: Hathras

Member of Zila Panchayat
- In office 2000–2005
- Constituency: Aligarh

Member of Uttar Pradesh Legislative Assembly from Iglas
- In office 2017–2019

Personal details
- Born: 1 May 1958 Deorou, Aligarh, Uttar Pradesh, India
- Died: 24 April 2024 (aged 65) Hathras, Uttar Pradesh, India
- Party: Bharatiya Janata Party
- Spouse: Rajni Diler (m. 1975)
- Children: 4 (1 sons & 3 daughter)
- Parent(s): Kishan Lal Diler (father); Shanti Devi (mother)

Rajvir Singh Diler (1 May 1958 – 24 April 2024) was an Indian politician and member of the Lok Sabha, from Hathras constituency, Uttar Pradesh representing the Bharatiya Janata Party. His father Kishan Lal Diler was former MP from Hathras. He was elected to Uttar Pradesh Legislative Assembly from Iglas in 2017, but he resigned. Diler died from a heart attack on 24 April 2024, at the age of 65.
