= Rajesh Diwakar =

Indian politician

Member of the India Parliament for Hathras
- In office 1 September 2014 – 23 May 2019
- Preceded by: Sarika Devendra Singh Baghel
- Succeeded by: Rajvir Singh Diler
- Constituency: Hathras

Personal details
- Born: 12 March 1971 (age 55) Ladpur, Hathras, Uttar Pradesh
- Party: Bharatiya Janata Party
- Spouse: Smt. Sweta Choudhry
- Children: 2
- Occupation: Social Service
- As of 17 December, 2016

Rajesh Diwakar is a member of the Bharatiya Janata Party who won the 2014 Indian general elections from the Hathras (Lok Sabha constituency). Instead, Rajveer Diler, a sitting MLA, was nominated and became the Member of Parliament representing Hathras.
