= Mau Chirayal =

- village
- Interactive map of Mau Chirayal
- Coordinates: 27°46′48″N 78°23′37″E
- Country: India
- State: Uttar Pradesh
- District: Hathras

Government
  - Body: Gram panchayat

Population (2011)
  - Total: 4,272

Languages
  - Official: Hindi
- Time zone: UTC+5:30 (IST)
- Postal code: 204215

Mau Chirayal is a village in Hathras district in the Indian state of Uttar Pradesh. The village has a literacy rate of 64.6%. BJP, SP, BSP are the major political parties in this area. There is no railway station near to Mau Chirayal in less than 10 km. Nearest railway station are Sikandra Rao railway station and Aligarh Junction by than you have to pick roadway's service to Gopi (Local Bus stand) than local tempo and mini auto service to reach village.

== History ==
The name Mau Chirayal is mixture of two names one is Mau and second is Chirayal and Mau mean to "main hun" a popular saying in the Brij area of India. It means "I am here" due to this entire village belonging to royal pundhir hem and his son ram, who has stopped British rules Tahsildar at the town of Sikandra Rao, Hathras.

== Geography ==
Mau Chirayal is a village under the Sikandra Rao municipal board in Hathras district in the Indian state of Uttar Pradesh. It is connected to 8 kilometres (5.0 mi) in east from National Highway - 19. Mau Chirayal is also connected by the state highway No. 33 Sikanra Rao Kasganj. Mau Chirayal has no direct railway station is about 12 kilometres (7.5 mi) from the Sikandra Rao railway station. The nearest airport is Delhi International Airport, situated at around 160 kilometres (99 mi) from Mau Chirayal.
