= International Conference of Chief Justices of the World =

Conference of Chief Justices and Judges of the World

- Nickname: World Judiciary Summit
- Status: active
- Genre: conference
- Frequency: Annually
- Venue: World Unity Convention Center (WUCC), City Montessori School (CMS)
- Locations: Lucknow, Uttar Pradesh
- Country: India
- Years active: 25
- Inaugurated: May 6, 2001; 25 years ago
- Founder: Jagdish Gandhi
- Most recent: 21 November 2025; 11 months ago
- Next event: November 21, 2026; 16 days' time
- Area: World Law, World Judiciary, world government
- Organiser: Jagdish Gandhi (2001–2003); Geeta Gandhi Kingdon (2024–present)
- Sponsor: City Montessori School (CMS)
- Website: https://cmseducation.org/iccjw/home/

The International Conference of Chief Justices of the World or World Judiciary Summit is an annual gathering of the highest-ranking judicial officers from all over the world in Lucknow, India. Chief justices and judges from various countries gathers once a year to discuss global legal issues, share experiences, and promote the rule of law. It aims to foster international understanding and collaboration in the field of world law and world judiciary. Participants discuss a wide range of topics, including judicial reforms, human rights, sustainable development, and access to justice.

As of 2024, 1520 Hon'ble Chief Justices, Judges and Heads of States from 142 countries have participated in the past 25 conferences.

== See also ==
- World Government
- World constitution
- World Federalism
- World Constitutional Convention
- Constitution for the Federation of Earth
- World Constitution and Parliament Association
