= Korna Chamarua =

- village
- Interactive map of Korna Chamarua
- Country: India
- State: Uttar Pradesh

Government
  - Body: Gram panchayat

Area
  - Total: 3.735 km^{2} (1.442 sq mi)

Population (2011)
  - Total: 2,138
  - Density: 572.4/km^{2} (1,483/sq mi)

Languages
  - Official: Hindi
- Time zone: UTC+5:30 (IST)
- Postal code: 204213
- Vehicle registration: UP-
- Coastline: 0 kilometres (0 mi)

Korna Chamarua is a village 8 km from Hathras and 6 km from district headquarters Mahamaya Nagar in the state of Uttar Pradesh. Also a gram panchayat, as of Census 2011 it has a population of 2,138 with 356 houses. Its PIN is 204213.
