= Joti Saroop =

Indian politician (born 1927)

Member of Parliament, Lok Sabha
- In office 1962–1967
- Succeeded by: Nardeo Snatak
- Constituency: Hathras, Uttar Pradesh

Personal details
- Born: 1927
- Party: Republican Party of India
- Spouse: Vidya Devi

Joti Saroop (born 1927) was an Indian politician. He was elected to the Lok Sabha, the lower house of the Parliament of India from Hathras, Uttar Pradesh as a member of the Republican Party of India.
