= Rudayan =

Rudayan may refer to places in India:

- Rudayan, Budaun, Uttar Pradesh
- Rudayan, Hathras, Uttar Pradesh
