= Teerthdham Mangalayatan Mandir =

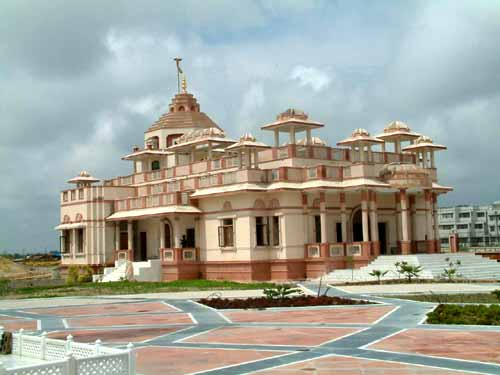
- Mahavira temple, Teerthdham Mangalayatan

Religion
- Affiliation: Jainism
- Deity: Rishabhanatha, Mahavira, Bahubali
- Festival: Mahavir Jayanti
- Governing body: Shri Adinath Kund-Kund Kahan Digamber Jain Trust

Location
- Location: Hathras, Uttar Pradesh
- Interactive map of Teerthdham Mangalayatan Mandir
- Coordinates: 27°45′42″N 78°05′20″E

Architecture
- Established: 20th century
- Temple: 4

Website
- https://mangalayatan.com/

Teerthdham Mangalayatan Mandir or Teerthdham Mangalyatan is a Jain Pilgrimage site on Aligarh-Agra Highway, Hathras, Uttar Pradesh, India. Developed by Shri Adinath Kund-Kund Kahan Digamber Jain Trust, the pilgrimage also includes a Bahubali temple in its infrastructure.

== Gallery ==
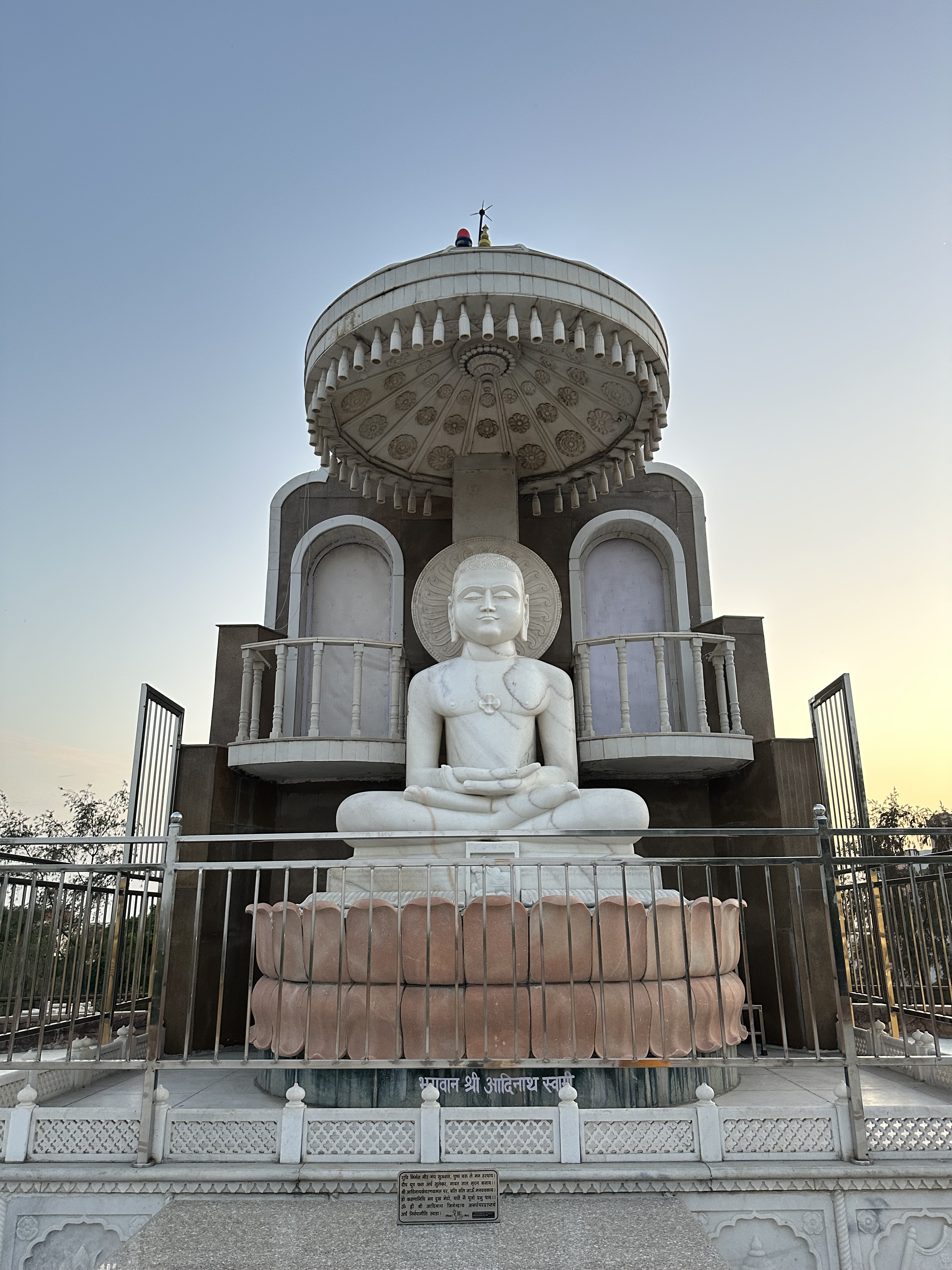

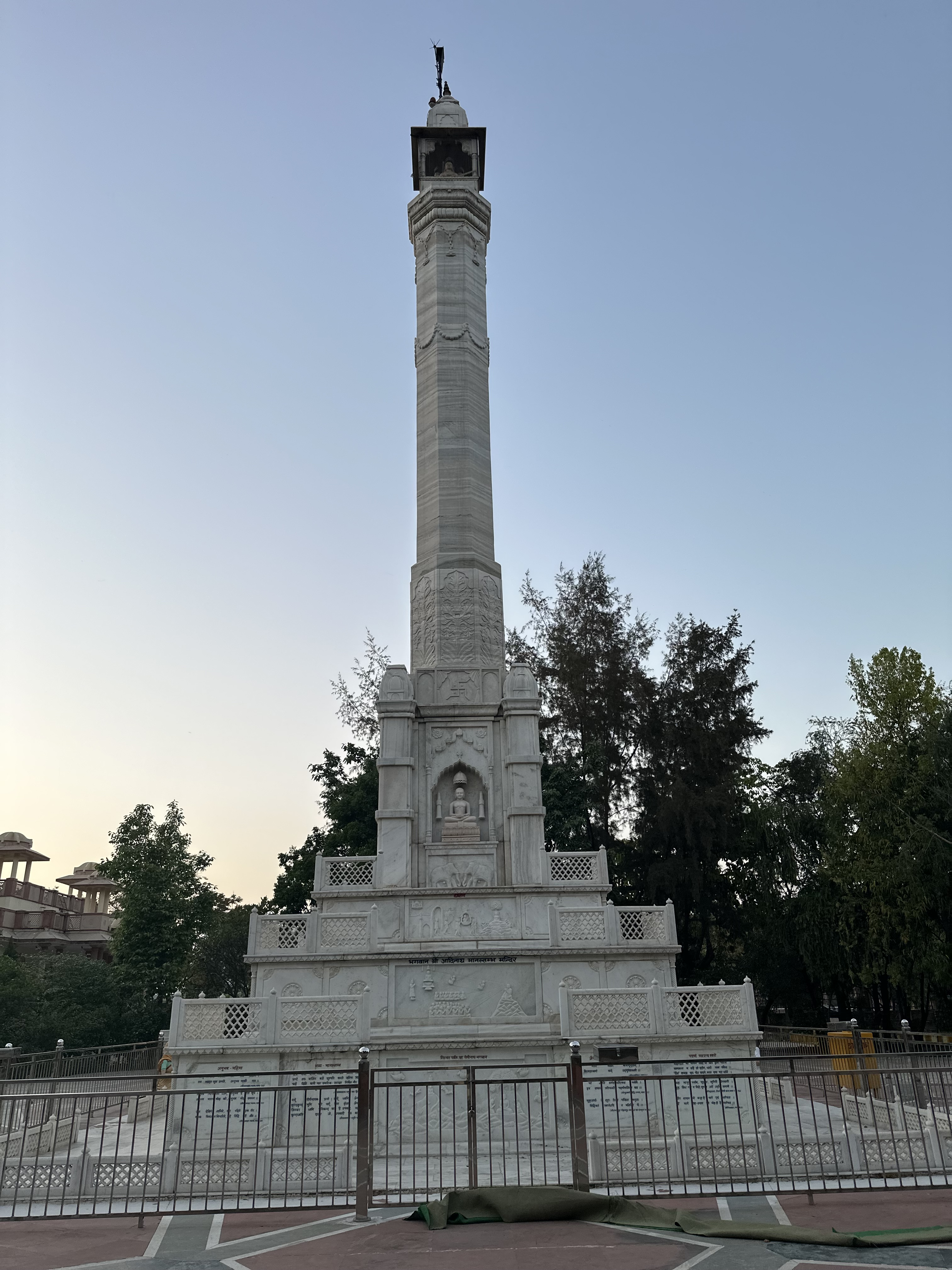

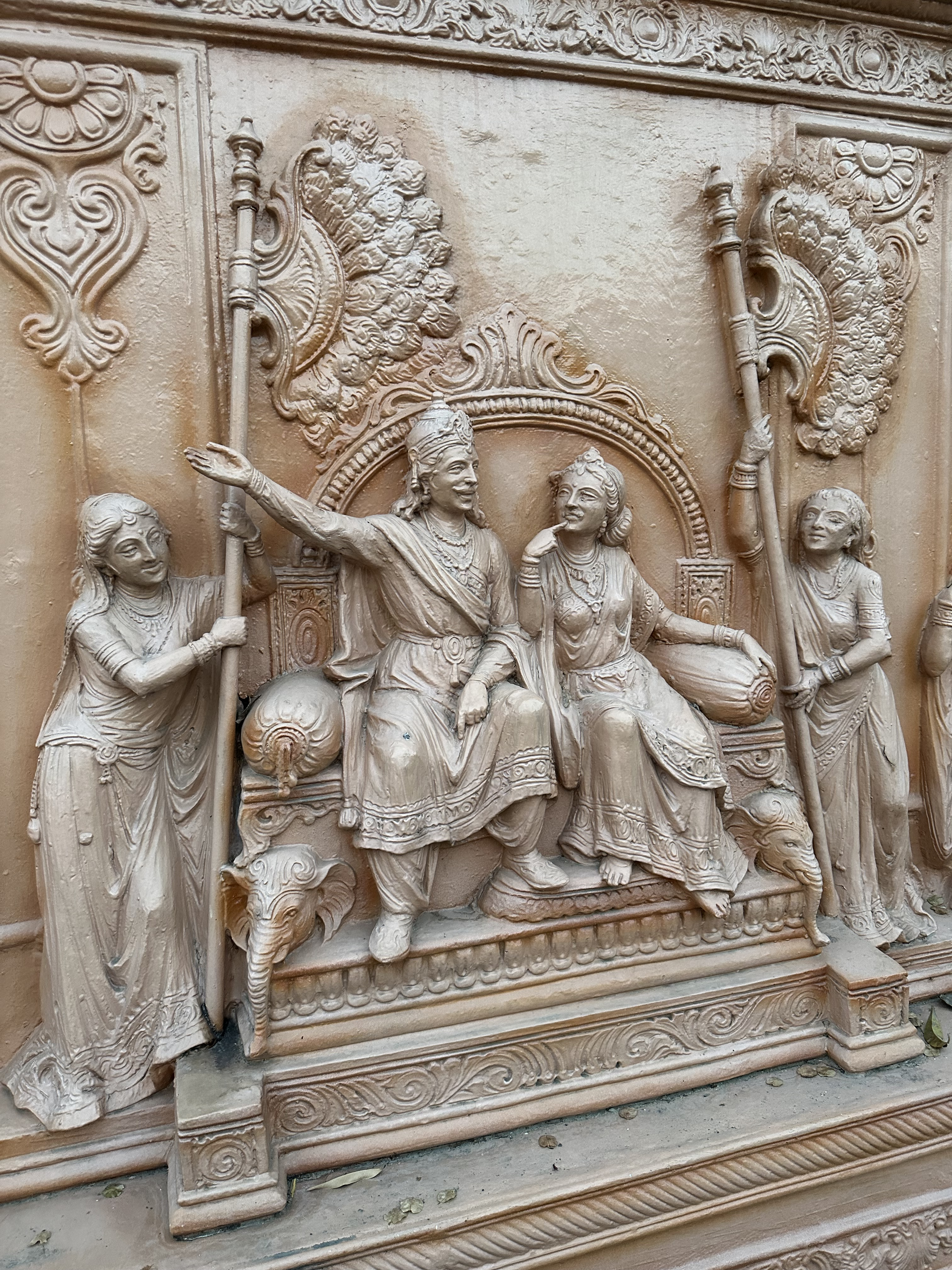
