= Genda =

Genda or GENDA can refer to:

== People ==
- Genda Lal Chaudhary (born 1951), Indian politician
- Genda Lal Dixit (1888–1920), an Indian revolutionary
- Minoru Genda (源田 実; 1904–1989), Japanese military aviator and politician
- Sōsuke Genda (源田 壮亮; born 1993), Japanese professional baseball player
- Tesshō Genda (玄田 哲章; born 1948), Japaneseactor, voice actor and narrator

== See also ==
- Sasural Genda Phool, an Indian television drama series which aired 2010–12
- The Gender Expression Non-Discrimination Act, a 2019 New York law
- "Genda Phool", a song by Badshah
- Genda Shigyō Japanese paper production company
