= Jagdish Gandhi =

Indian politician and educationist (1936–2024)

- Born: Jagdish Agrawal; 10 November 1934; Barsauli, Sikandra Rao, United Provinces of Agra and Oudh, British India
- Died: 22 January 2024 (aged 87)
- Education: University of Lucknow (B.Com, 1959)
- Known for: Founder of City Montessori School and Convener of International Conference of Chief Justices of the World
- Spouse: Bharti Gandhi
- Awards: Yash Bharti Award; UP Ratna Award; Global Pioneer Award; Honorary doctorate Award; Gusi Peace Prize; UNESCO Peace Education Award; LU Lifetime Achievement Award

Uttar Pradesh Legislative Assembly
- In office 1969–1974
- Preceded by: Nek Ram Sharma
- Succeeded by: Farzand Ali
- Constituency: Sikandra Rao

Personal details
- Party: Independent

Late Jagdish Gandhi (10 November 1934 – 22 January 2024) was an eminent Indian educator and the Founder of City Montessori School (CMS), Lucknow, which is recognised as the largest school in the world by the Guinness Book of World Records. The school has 66,000 students studying from Pre-primary to Grade 12 in 22 campuses across Lucknow. His work centred on promoting education, world unity, peace, service and the development of children as responsible world citizens.

Born in Barsauli village in the Sikandra Rao area of Aligarh district, Uttar Pradesh, Gandhi was influenced by his uncle, Prabhu Dayal, a freedom fighter and social worker, and by the teachings of Mahatma Gandhi and Vinoba Bhave and the philosophy of Vasudhaiva Kutumbakam. These influences shaped his belief that education could address social conflict by developing attitudes of understanding and cooperation from an early age.

He studied at G. S. College, Sikandra Rao, and Champa Agarwal College, Mathura, before completing a Bachelor of Commerce at the University of Lucknow in 1959. During his university years, he served as the President of the Lucknow University Students’ Union.

== City Montessori School ==
In 1959, Jagdish Gandhi and his wife Bharti Gandhi founded City Montessori School in Lucknow. The school began with five children and ₹300 borrowed capital in a rented room, and the school motto, “Jai Jagat” (Victory to the World), expressed his belief that education should develop respect for humanity beyond national, religious and cultural boundaries.

Jagdish Gandhi regarded education as more than academic preparation. He believed schools should develop character, social responsibility, cooperation and an understanding of humanity’s shared interests. He promoted a broader view of education that addressed the material, human and spiritual dimensions of a child’s development.

Under his leadership, CMS grew into a large multi-campus school system in Lucknow and became known for values-based education and organised 20 international annual educational events that brought children and educators from various countries and different parts of India together for cross-cultural exchanges. He also organised the International Conference of Chief Justices of the World every year continually for 24 years in order to create a climate of global opinion in favour of a world government that can solve supranational problems. He also organised an annual conference on interfaith harmony.

In 2002, CMS received the UNESCO Prize for Peace Education for its efforts to promote education for peace and tolerance. It was recognised by the Guinness Book of World Records for its pupil enrolment and as the world’s largest school by pupils in a single city. In 2014, CMS was accorded the NGO status by the United Nations Department of Public Information (UN-DPI).

Jagdish Gandhi (known to his staff as “Bhaiyya Ji”) was wise and discerning in all public dealings. While being an excellent judge of character, with sharp powers of observation, he nevertheless had a sin-covering eye, giving erring people seemingly infinite latitude. He was a staunch believer in the power of God's assistance in the face of difficulties, believing that when work is done with a service motive, it draws God's help to fight the obstacles to that work. Informed by the teachings of the Baha'i Faith, his understanding of religion was that it is important to follow the teachings of your faith in your life and to change your conduct in the light of those teachings, rather than merely doing the rituals associated with that religion. He believed that idle worship is meaningless; it needs to be replaced by deeds of purity and good personal conduct.

Jagdish Gandhi's many qualities are worthy of emulation. The most important of these was detachment from the things of this world, e.g. detachment from money, wealth, power, position, and political ambition. Another important quality was his legendary humility and servitude.

== Political career ==
Jagdish Gandhi also entered electoral politics. He contested the 1969 Uttar Pradesh Legislative Assembly election as an independent candidate from the Sikandra Rao constituency in district Aligarh and was elected. He served as a Member of the Uttar Pradesh Legislative Assembly from 1969 to 1974. He subsequently left active politics and returned his attention to education and peace-building.

His experience in the political field convinced him that social change would require work at the level of education and human values. Hence, he concentrated on launching educational programmes which brought together young people from different cultural, linguistic, religious and national backgrounds.

== Peace education and international work ==
An important theme in Jagdish Gandhi's work was using education to build peace. He thought that children must be taught about people of different countries, cultures and religions, and they should feel a part of the larger human community.

CMS has been organising various international educational programs and student programs with the aim of encouraging cross-cultural interactions. He has also been supporting the programmes which encourage interfaith harmony, international cooperation, as well as social and environmental responsibility.

In 2001, he started the International Conference of Chief Justices of the World (ICCJW) in Lucknow on the themes related to Article 51c of the Constitution of India. The conference brings together senior members of the judiciary from various countries annually in order to discuss international law, children's rights and global governance. By 2025, 1,576 chief justices and judges from 143 countries had participated in the annual conferences.

== Awards and recognition ==
Late Jagdish Gandhi has received several national and international awards for his contribution to education, peace and social development. These included the Yash Bharti Award of the Government of Uttar Pradesh, the Gusi Peace Prize, the Quality Pioneer Award of Mauritius, the Key to the City of Georgetown, USA, and the Derozio Award presented by the Council for the Indian School Certificate Examinations. He also received honorary doctorates from universities in the United Kingdom, Russia, Argentina, Peru and Mongolia. The University of Lucknow conferred a Lifetime Achievement Award on him in 2018 in recognition of his outstanding contributions to education. But, beyond his accolades and achievements lies the life of a man of remarkable humility and integrity, whose life serves as a beacon of hope and inspiration for all who aspire to make a difference in the world.

== Legacy ==
Jagdish Gandhi passed away in Lucknow on 22 January 2024, but let us remember the impact that an individual can create in the world and strive to follow in the footsteps of the late Jagdish Gandhi through our dedication to service, justice and peace.

Throughout his personal and professional life, he maintained strong relationships with family, staff, and community members. Family members described him as dedicated to his children, grandchildren, and wife. As an employer, he was noted for supporting his staff's professional development, while in the public sphere, he regularly attended community events and celebrations across various social backgrounds.

PERSONAL INFORMATION
Date of Birth:	10 November 1934
Birth Place:	Barsauli Village, Sikandra Rao, District Aligarh, Uttar Pradesh
Spouse:	Bharti Gandhi, Ph.D., Child Psychologist, Founder-Director, City Montessori School, (CMS) Lucknow, India.
Children:	1. Daughter – Sunita Gandhi, Founder DEVI Sansthan (Dignity Education Vision International); 2. Daughter – Geeta Gandhi Kingdon, Managing Director, CMS; 3. Daughter – Nita Gandhi Forouhi, Professor of Population Health and Nutrition, University of Cambridge, UK.; 4. Son – Vinay Gandhi, Honorary Technical Advisor, CMS
Education:	Bachelor’s Degree in Commerce
Elementary:	Village-based school in Barsauli, district Aligarh, Uttar Pradesh, India
High School (Grade 10):	G. S. College, Sikandara Rao, Aligarh, Uttar Pradesh, India
Intermediate (Grade 12):	Champa Agarwal College, Mathura, Uttar Pradesh India
University:	Bachelor of Commerce from Lucknow University, Uttar Pradesh 1959

== Bibliography ==
https://cmseducation.org/worlds-largest-school-by-enrollment/

https://cmseducation.org/dr-jagdish-gandhi/

https://www.guinnessworldrecords.com/world-records/largest-school-by-pupils

https://unesdoc.unesco.org/ark:/48223/pf0000129085

https://cmseducation.org/awards-to-dr-jagdish-gandhi/
