= HTJ =

HTJ may refer to:

- Hathras Road railway station, in Uttar Pradesh, India
- Horizontal Tabulation With Justification, a C1 control code
