= Chandra Pal Shailani =

Indian politician

Member of Parliament, Lok Sabha
- In office 1971-1977
- Preceded by: Nardeo Snatak
- Succeeded by: Ram Prasad Deshmukh
- In office 1980-1984
- Preceded by: Ram Prasad Deshmukh
- Succeeded by: Puran Chandra
- Constituency: Hathras, Uttar Pradesh

Personal details
- Born: January 1940 Sikandra Rao, Aligarh District, United Provinces, British India (present-day Uttar Pradesh, India)
- Died: 30 November 2021 (aged 81) Ram Manohar Lohia Hospital, Delhi
- Party: Janata Party (Secular)
- Other political affiliations: Republican Party of India, Indian National Congress
- Spouse: Nirmala Shailani

Chandra Pal Shailani is an Indian politician. He is a follower of B. R. Ambedkar, and member of the Republican Party of India. He was elected to the Lok Sabha, the lower house of the Parliament of India from Hathras, Uttar Pradesh.
