= Hathras Junction railway station =

Railway station in Uttar Pradesh, India

Hathras Junction
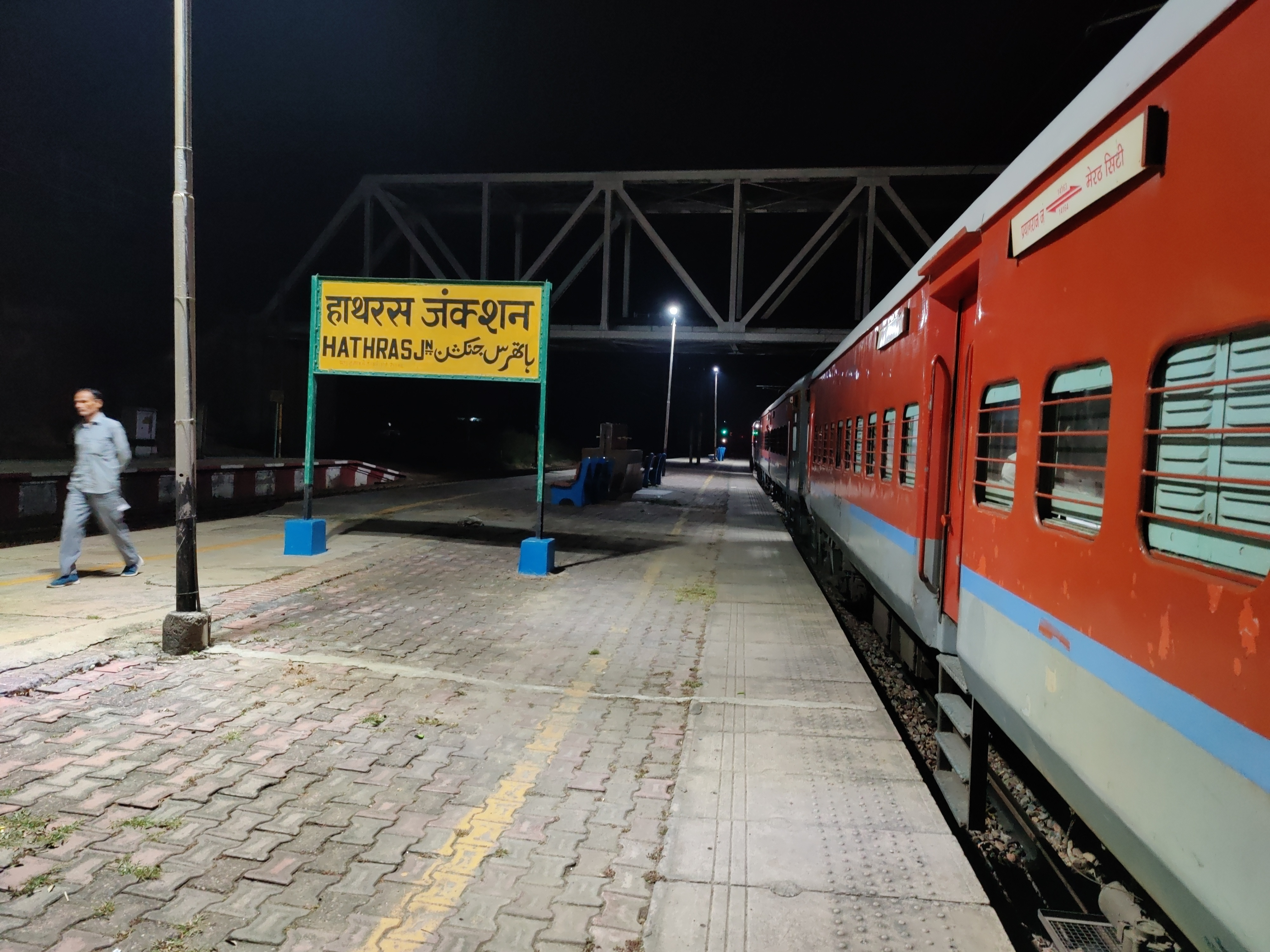
- File:Hathras Junction railway station

General information
- Location: NH 530B, Devinagar, Hathras Junction, Hathras, Uttar Pradesh; India
- Coordinates: 27°37′30″N 78°08′13″E
- Elevation: 183 metres (600 ft)
- System: Indian Railways junction station
- Owner: Indian Railways
- Operator: North Central Railways
- Lines: Kanpur–Delhi section Hathras Junction–Hathras Fort Line
- Platforms: 4
- Tracks: 8
- Connections: Auto, E-Rickshaw, Bus Stand

Construction
- Structure type: Standard on ground
- Cycle facilities: No

Other information
- Status: Functioning
- Station code: HRS
- Zone(s): North Central Railway zone
- Division(s): Prayagraj

History
- Opened: 1885-86
- Electrified: 1975–76
Location
- Location within Uttar Pradesh Location within India

Hathras Junction railway station is on the Kanpur–Delhi section of Howrah–Delhi main line and Howrah–Gaya–Delhi line. It is located in Hathras district in the Indian state of Uttar Pradesh. It serves Hathras and surrounding areas.

== Station oddity ==
Hathras Junction railway station is one having an oddity. The station is on the 5 ft 6 in (1,676 mm) broad gauge Kanpur–Delhi section. A Broad gauge line takes off from this station and goes to Hathras Kila railway station. At the Kanpur-end of the Hathras Junction railway station, the Mathura–Kasganj (now broad gauge) line cuts across the broad-gauge line at right angles and has a separate overhead station named Hathras Road within the same premises. Hathras lies 9 km away in the west and is also served by Hathras City railway station on the broad gauge (previously metre gauge) line.

== History ==
Through trains started running on the Howrah–Delhi line in 1865–66.

The 47 km (29 mi) long Hathras Road-Mathura Cantt line was opened in 1875 by Bombay, Baroda and Central India Railway. It was transferred to North Eastern Railway in 1952. The Mathura–Kasganj line was converted from 1,000 mm (3 ft 3 3/8 in)-wide metre gauge to 5 ft 6 in (1,676 mm) broad gauge in 2009.

== Electrification ==
The Tundla-Hathras-Aligarh-Ghaziabad sector was electrified in 1975–76.

== Major trains ==
- Neelachal Express
- Amrapali Express
- Gomti Express
- Unchahar Express
- Sambalpur-Jammu Tawi Express
- Sangam Express
- Farakka Express (via Sultanpur)
- Farakka Express (via Ayodhya Cantt)
- Netaji Express
- Sikkim Mahananda Express

== Connectivity ==
The station provides connectivity to neighbouring major railway stations like Delhi Junction, Ghaziabad Junction, Aligarh Junction, Meerut City Junction, Amritsar Junction, Chandigarh Junction, Tundla Junction, Agra Cantt., Etawah, Phaphund, Kanpur Central etc.
It also facilitates connectivity to many cities like New Delhi, Chandigarh, Amritsar, Lucknow, Kanpur, Ludhiana, Varanasi, Kota, Jaipur, Tatanagar, Patna, Kolkata etc.

== See also ==
- Hathras Kila railway station
- Hathras City railway station
- Hathras Road railway station
- Ghaziabad Junction railway station
- Mathura Junction railway station
- Aligarh Junction railway station
- Agra Fort railway station
- New Delhi railway station
- Kanpur Central railway station

Preceding station	Indian Railways	Following station
Sasni towards ?	North Central Railway zone Kanpur–Delhi section	Pora towards ?
Terminus	North Central Railway zone Hathras–Hathras Kila link	Hathras Kila towards ?
