= Hathras Road railway station =

Railway Station in Uttar Pradesh, India

General information
- Location: SH 33, Hathras, Uttar Pradesh; India
- Coordinates: 27.6231°N 78.1397°E
- Elevation: 183 metres (600 ft)
- System: Indian Railway station
- Line: Mathura–Kanpur section
- Platforms: 1
- Tracks: 2 (single electrified broad gauge)
- Connections: Auto stand

Construction
- Structure type: Standard (ground station)
- Parking: No
- Cycle facilities: No

Other information
- Status: Functioning
- Station code: HTJ
- Zone(s): North Eastern Railway
- Division(s): Izzatnagar
Location
- Location within India Location within Uttar Pradesh

Hathras Road railway station is a small railway station in Hathras district, Uttar Pradesh with the station code HTJ. The station consists of a single platform and lacks many facilities including water, sanitation, and shelter.

== About ==
Hathras Road railway station is a two platform station located in Hathras district, Uttar Pradesh, serving Hathras City. Its code is HTJ. From this station it is 9 km east to Hathras City railway station and 9 km south to Hathras Kila (Fort) railway station.

== See also ==
- Hathras City railway station
- Hathras Kila railway station
- Hathras Junction railway station
- Kasganj Junction railway station
- Mathura Junction
