= Babrala =

Town in Uttar Pradesh, India

Babrala is a town and nagar panchayat in the Sambhal district in the state of Uttar Pradesh, India. Babrala is located on NH 509 (Moradabad to Aligarh).

Babrala is located near Narora Atomic Power Station. The Yara Fertilizers Private Limited (formerly known as Tata Chemicals Limited) Plant is also located in Babrala with an installed capacity of 864,600 tonnes of urea per year. Babrala is witnessing significant industrial development. Recently, the UP government approved 73 new projects for the Babrala industrial area, with four already operational. The industrial area spans over 36.04 acres and hosts various sectors, including chemicals, food and agro products, and electrical equipment.

== Geography ==
Babrala is located at 28.27°N 78.4°E. It has an average elevation of 177 metres (580 feet).

== Demographics ==
As of the 2018 Indian census, Babrala had a population of 14,447. Males constitute 53% of the population and females 47%. Babrala has an average literacy rate of 72%, more than the national average of 59.5%; with 80% of males and 76% of females being literate. Seventeen percent of the population is under 6 years of age.

Religions in Babrala
Religion	Percent
Hindus	83%
Muslims	15%
Jains	0.5%
Others†	0.5%
Distribution of religions †Includes Sikhs (0.2%), Buddhists (<0.2%).
