= Bengali Singh =

Indian politician

Member of Parliament, Lok Sabha
- In office 1989-1991
- Preceded by: Puran Chand
- Succeeded by: Lal Bahadur Rawal
- Constituency: Hathras, Uttar Pradesh

Personal details
- Born: 1 July 1940 (age 85) Larpur, Aligarh District, United Provinces, British India (present-day Uttar Pradesh, India)
- Party: Janata Dal
- Spouse: Savitri Devi

Bengali Singh (Hindi: बंगाली सिंह) is an Indian politician. He was elected to the Lok Sabha, the lower house of the Parliament of India from Hathras, Uttar Pradesh as a member of the Janata Dal.
