= Sahpau =

- town
- Location in Uttar Pradesh, India
- Coordinates: 27°26′20″N 78°08′10″E
- Country: India
- State: Uttar Pradesh
- District: Hathras
  - Rank: 1

Population (2017)
  - Total: 16,000

Languages
  - Official: Hindi
- Time zone: UTC+5:30 (IST)
- Website: www.sahpau.350.com

Sahpau is a town and a nagar panchayat in Hathras district in the Indian state of Uttar Pradesh.

== Demographics ==
As of 2001 India census, Sahpau had a population of 16,000, with males constituting 54% of the population and females 46%.Sahpau's average literacy rate of 57% is lower than the national average of 59.5%: male literacy is 69%, and female literacy is 44%. 17% of the population is under 6 years of age.

The distance of the town from Delhi is 190 Kilometre. It is situated at the distance of 38 Kilometre and 28 Kilometre respectively from the city of Agra and district Hathras.

== Education ==
- Janta Inter College
- M L Inter College
- K C Degree College
- Shri Ram School of Nursing And Paramedicals

== Tourism ==
The ancient temple of Hindu Goddess (Devi) Bhadrakali is popular in the region and is visited by a large number of pilgrims on festivals particular in the days of Navratri.
