= Purdilnagar =

Purdil Nagar
- Town
- Location in Uttar Pradesh, India Location in India
- Coordinates: 27°40′N 78°22′E
- Country: India
- State: Uttar Pradesh
- District: Hathras
- Founder: Nawab purdil khan

Population (2011)
  - Total: 21,885

Languages
  - Official: Hindi

Demographics
  - Literacy: 60.2%
  - Sex Ratio: 894
- Time zone: UTC+5:30 (IST)
- PIN: 204214

Purdil Nagar is a town and a notified area council in Hathras district in the Indian state of Uttar Pradesh. It is located on National Highway 21 (NH-21) The Founder of Purdilnagar was Nawab purdil khan.

== Demographics ==
According to the 2011 census, Purdilnagar had a population of 21,885. Males constitute 53% of the population and females 47%. Purdilnagar has an average literacy rate of 60.2%, lower than the state average of 67.68%: male literacy is 69.04%, and female literacy is 50.39%. In Purdilnagar, 18% of the population is under 6 years of age.
