= Hathras City railway station =

Railway station in Uttar Pradesh, India

Hathras City
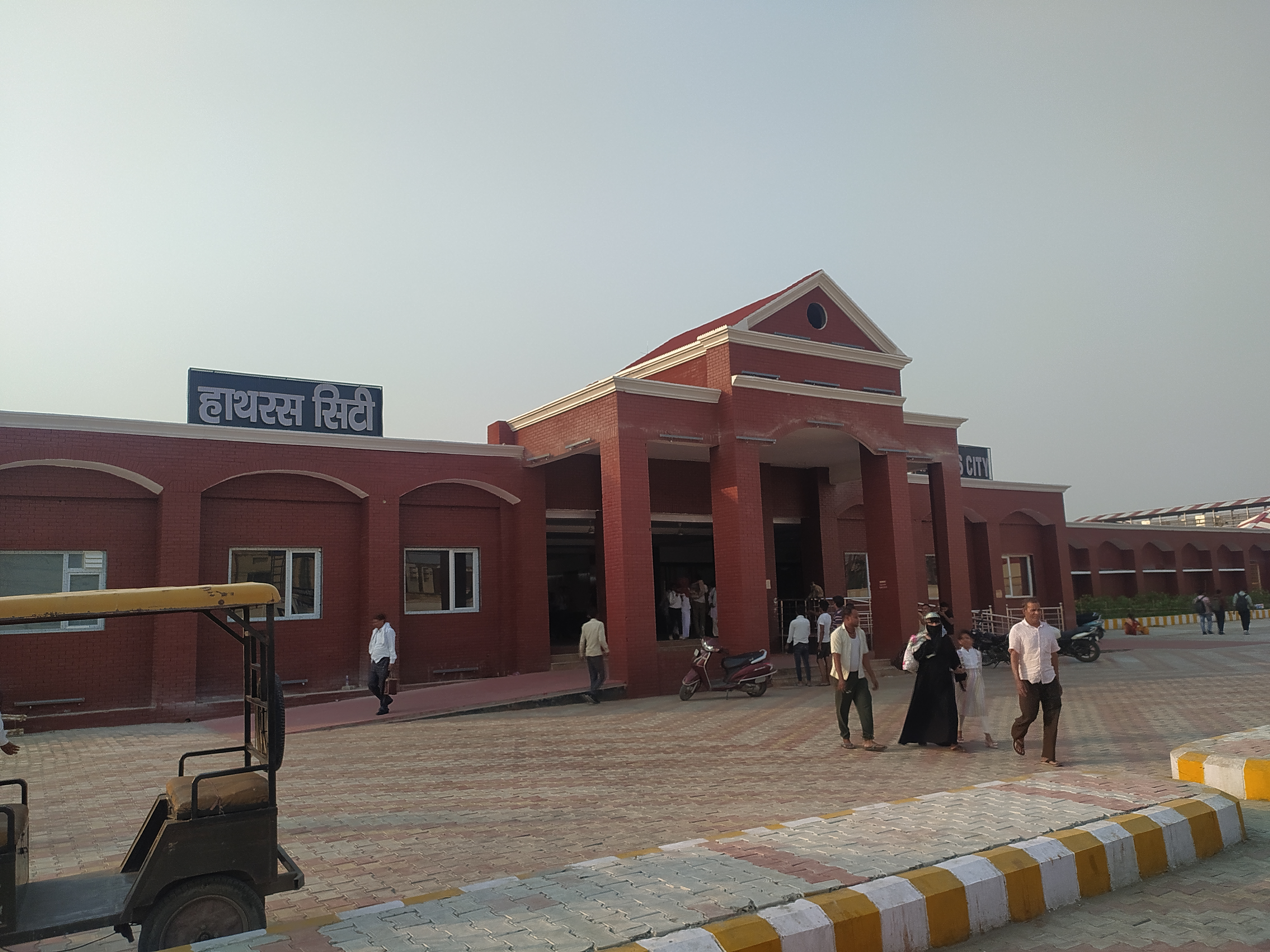
- Hathras City Railway Station (Gate No.1)

General information
- Location: Near P.C. Bangla Degree College, NH 530B, City Station Road, Sasni Gate, Hathras, Uttar Pradesh; India
- Coordinates: 27.5999°N 78.0551°E
- Elevation: 178 metres (584 ft)
- System: Indian Railways station
- Owner: Indian Railways
- Operator: North Eastern Railways
- Line: Mathura–Kasganj–Kanpur Mathura–Kasganj–Bareilly
- Platforms: 2
- Tracks: 2
- Connections: Auto, Taxi, E-Rickshaw

Construction
- Structure type: At grade
- Platform levels: 178m above sea level
- Parking: Available
- Cycle facilities: Yes

Other information
- Status: Functioning
- Station code: HTC
- Zone(s): Northern Eastern Railway
- Division(s): Izzatnagar
- Classification: NSG-5

History
- Opened: 1965
- Rebuilt: In 2009 with broad gauge network & in 2019 rebuilt platform No.2 with electrified tracks

Passengers
- 30,000 passengers daily
Location
- Location within Uttar Pradesh Location within India

Hathras City railway station is a railway station in Hathras district, Uttar Pradesh. Its station code is HTC.

== About ==
Hathras City railway station is a two-platform station serving Hathras City. From this station there are links to the Hathras Junction, Hathras Road, Hathras Killah (Fort), Mendu and New Hathras railway stations, though the last is a dedicated freight corridor serving freight trains only.

== Trains ==
Train name	Train number	Arrival	Departure	Train origin	Train destination
AF RMR EXP	15055	00:02	00:04	Agra Fort	Ramnagar
RMR AF EXP	15056	03:36	03:38	Ramnagar	Agra Fort
Kasganj Achhnera Fast Passenger	55337	06:01	06:02	Kasganj Junction	Achhnera Junction
Achhnera Kasganj Fast Passenger	55338	13:43	13:44	Achhnera Junction	Kasganj Junction
Ahmedabad–Gorakhpur Express	19409	05:36	05:38	Ahmedabad Junction	Gorakhpur Junction
Gorakhpur–Ahmedabad Express	19410	17:26	17:28	Gorakhpur Junction	Ahmedabad Junction
Kasganj–Mathura Passenger	55353	21:45	21:47	Kasganj Junction	Mathura Junction
Mathura–Kasganj Passenger	55354	07:41	07:43	Mathura Junction	Kasganj Junction

== See also ==
- Hathras Road railway station
- Hathras Kila railway station
- Hathras Junction railway station
- Kasganj Junction railway station
- Mathura Junction railway station
- Agra Cantonment railway station
- New Delhi railway station
- Bharatpur Junction railway station
- Sikandra Rao railway station
