= Devendra Agrawal =

Indian politician

Devendra Agrawal देवेन्द्र अग्रवाल

MLA, 16th Legislative Assembly
- In office Mar 2012 – 2017
- Preceded by: Anil Chaudhary
- Constituency: Sadabad

Personal details
- Born: 1 January 1965 (age 61) Hathras district
- Party: Samajwadi Party
- Spouse: Latarani Agrawal (wife)
- Children: 2 sons
- Parent: Mahendrapal Agrawal (father)
- Education: Gandhi Inter College, Mathura
- Profession: Businessman & politician

Devendra Agrawal is an Indian politician and a member of the 16th Legislative Assembly of India. He represents the Sadabad constituency of Uttar Pradesh and is a member of the Samajwadi Party political party.

== Early life and education ==
Devendra Agrawal was born in Hathras district. He attended the Gandhi Inter College, Mathura and is educated till tenth grade.

== Political career ==
Devendra Agrawal has been a MLA for one term. He represented the Sadabad constituency and is a member of the Samajwadi Party political party.

== Posts held ==
#	From	To	Position	Comments
01	2012	Incumbent	Member, 16th Legislative Assembly	

== See also ==
- Sadabad (Assembly constituency)
- Sixteenth Legislative Assembly of Uttar Pradesh
- Uttar Pradesh Legislative Assembly
