= Sikandra Rao Assembly constituency =

Constituency of the Uttar Pradesh legislative assembly in India

Sikandra Rao
- Constituency No. 80 for the Uttar Pradesh Legislative Assembly

Constituency details
- Country: India
- Region: North India
- State: Uttar Pradesh
- District: Hathras
- Established: 1951
- Total electors: 318,067 (2012)
- Reservation: None

Member of Legislative Assembly
- 18th Uttar Pradesh Legislative Assembly
- Incumbent Birendra Singh Rana
- Party: Bharatiya Janata Party

Sikandra Rao Assembly constituency is one of the 403 constituencies of the Uttar Pradesh Legislative Assembly, India. It is a part of the Hathras district and one of the three assembly constituencies in the Hathras Lok Sabha constituency. The first election in this assembly constituency was held in 1952 after the DPACO (delimitation order) was passed in 1951. After the "Delimitation of Parliamentary and Assembly Constituencies Order" was passed in 2008, the constituency was assigned identification number 80.

== Wards/areas ==
The extent of Sikandra Rao Assembly constituency is Hathras Tehsil.

== Members of the Legislative Assembly ==
#	Term	Name	Party	From	To	Days	Comments	Ref
01	01st Vidhan Sabha	Nek Ram Sharma	Indian National Congress	May-1952	Mar-1957	1,776	-	
02	02nd Vidhan Sabha	Malkhan Singh	Indian National Congress	Apr-1957	Mar-1962	1,800	-	
03	03rd Vidhan Sabha	Nek Ram Sharma	Independent	Mar-1962	Mar-1967	1,828	-	
04	04th Vidhan Sabha	Nek Ram Sharma	Independent	Mar-1967	Apr-1968	402	-	
05	05th Vidhan Sabha	Jagdish Gandhi	Independent	Feb-1969	Mar-1974	1,832	-	
06	06th Vidhan Sabha	Farzand Ali	Bharatiya Kranti Dal	Mar-1974	Apr-1977	1,153	-	
07	07th Vidhan Sabha	Nem Singh Chauhan	Janata Party	Jun-1977	Feb-1980	969	-	
08	08th Vidhan Sabha	Pushpa Chauhan	Indian National Congress (I)	Jun-1980	Mar-1985	1,735	-	
09	09th Vidhan Sabha	Suresh Pratap Singh	Lok Dal	Mar-1985	Nov-1989	1,725	-	
10	10th Vidhan Sabha	Suresh Pratap Gandhi	Janata Dal	Dec-1989	Apr-1991	488	-	
11	11th Vidhan Sabha	Suresh Pratap Gandhi	Janata Dal	Jun-1991	Dec-1992	533	-	
12	12th Vidhan Sabha	Amar Singh	Samajwadi Party	Dec-1993	Oct-1995	693	-	
13	13th Vidhan Sabha	Yashpal Singh Chauhan	Bharatiya Janata Party	Oct-1996	May-2002	1,967	-	
14	14th Vidhan Sabha	Amar Singh Yadav	Independent	Feb-2002	May-2007	1,902	-	
15	15th Vidhan Sabha	Yashpal Singh Chauhan	Bharatiya Janata Party	May-2007	Mar-2012	1,762	-	
16	16th Vidhan Sabha	Ramveer Upadhyay	Bahujan Samaj Party	Mar-2012	Mar-2017	-	-	
17	17th Vidhan Sabha	Birendra Singh Rana	Bharatiya Janata Party	Mar-2017	Mar-2022			
18	18th Vidhan Sabha	Birendra Singh Rana	Bharatiya Janata Party	Mar-2022	Incumbent			

== Election results ==
=== 2027 ===
2027 Uttar Pradesh Legislative Assembly election: Sikandra Rao
Party	Candidate	Votes	%	±%
INDIA				
NDA				
BSP				
NOTA	None of the above			
Majority				
Turnout				
gain from		Swing		

=== 2022 ===
2022 Uttar Pradesh Legislative Assembly election: Sikandra Rao
Party	Candidate	Votes	%	±%
BJP	Birendra Singh Rana	98,094	41.63	▲6.42
SP	Dr Lalit Baghel	89,990	38.19	▲10.56
BSP	Awdhesh Kumar Singh	41,781	17.73	▼10.64
NOTA	None of the above	1,178	0.5	▼0.16
Majority		8,104	3.44	▼3.4
Turnout		235,619	62.39	▲0.65
BJP hold		Swing		

=== 2017 ===
2017 General Elections: Sikandra Rao
Party	Candidate	Votes	%	±%
BJP	Birendra Singh Rana	76,129	35.21	
BSP	Bani Singh Baghel	61,357	28.37	
SP	Yashpal Singh Chauhan	59,740	27.63	
Independent	Rakesh Singh Rana	7,222	3.34	
Independent	Amar Singh Yadav	4,876	2.25	
NOTA	None of the above	1,426	0.66	
Majority		14,772	6.84	
Turnout		216,244	61.74	
BJP gain from BSP		Swing		

=== 2012 ===
2012 Uttar Pradesh Legislative Assembly election: Sikandra Rao
Party	Candidate	Votes	%	±%
BSP	Ramveer Upadhyay	94,471	45.81	−
SP	Yashpal Singh Chauhan	93,408	45.3	−
RLD	Om Prakash Baghel	6,113	2.96	−
	Remainder 10 candidates	12,219	5.93	−
Majority		1,063	0.52	−
Turnout		206,211	64.83	−
BSP gain from BJP		Swing		

== See also ==
- Hathras district
- Hathras Lok Sabha constituency
- Sixteenth Legislative Assembly of Uttar Pradesh
- Uttar Pradesh Legislative Assembly
