= Hathras Kila railway station =

Railway station in Uttar Pradesh, India

Hathras Kila

General information
- Location: Near Shri Dauji Maharaj Temple, Hathras Fort, Hathras, Uttar Pradesh; India
- Coordinates: 27.5948°N 78.0583°E
- Elevation: 181 metres (594 ft)
- System: Indian Railways station
- Owner: Indian Railways
- Operator: North Central Railways
- Line: Hathras Junction-Hathras Fort
- Platforms: 1
- Tracks: 4 (single electrified broad gauge)
- Connections: Auto, E-Rickshaw

Construction
- Structure type: Standard (on-ground station)
- Parking: No
- Cycle facilities: No

Other information
- Status: Functioning
- Station code: HRF
- Fare zone: North Central Railway

Services
Preceding station	Indian Railways	Following station
Hathras Junction towards ?	North Central Railway zone Hathras Junction-Hathras Fort	Terminal towards ?
Location
- Location within India Location within Uttar Pradesh

Hathras Kila railway station or Hathras Fort Railway Station is a freight Terminus train station in Hathras, Uttar Pradesh. Its code is HRF. It serves Hathras city. The station consists of one platform. The platform is not well sheltered. It lacks many facilities including water and sanitation. This station is mainly used for cargo purposes and have rail yard in the station's premises.

== See also ==
- Hathras Junction railway station
- Hathras City railway station
- Hathras Road railway station
- Tundla Junction railway station
- Aligarh Junction railway station
