= Thakur Malkhan Singh =

Indian politician (1889–1962)

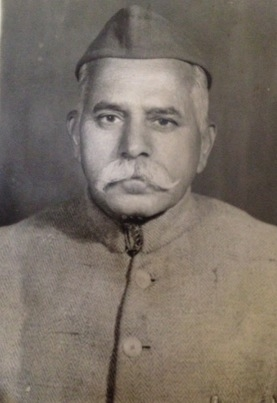
- Aligarh Kesari
- Born: 24 November 1889; Aligarh, Uttar Pradesh, India
- Died: 24 January 1962 (aged 72); Aligarh, Uttar Pradesh, India
- Occupations: Politician, Educationist, Revolutionary, Lawyer
- Organization(s): Indian National Congress; Praja Socialist Party
- Movement: Indian Independence movement
- Spouse: Sidhyawati Devi
- Children: 5

Thakur Malkhan Singh (24 November 1889 – 24 January 1962) was a noted politician, educationist, lawyer and freedom fighter during the Indian independence movement.

== Early life and education ==
Born in Aligarh, Uttar Pradesh, Thakur Malkhan Singh attended Government High School and later went on to achieve a B.Sc. degree from American Christian College at Allahabad in 1916 and then an LL.B. degree from Agra University in 1929. Even during his collegiate years, he was politically active and defected against authority to assist revolutionary students prior to the first Indian National Congress (INC) movement in 1921. He took part in numerous revolutionary activities in pursuit of India's independence and was imprisoned in all major INC mutinies.

== Career ==
Malkhan Singh's devotion to community service and the freedom struggle earned him the esteem of other revolutionaries, establishing his reputation as a very prominent Congressman and deploying a significant youth support base. After the Indian Independence in 1947, he was elected as the President of the Aligarh District Congress Committee (DCC). He had been a member of the Congress Socialist Party and became the most distinguished of thirteen state legislators who resigned from their positions in the Uttar Pradesh Assembly in 1948 to contest against the INC. After losing the by-elections in 1948 and the General Elections of 1952 as a Socialist candidate, he re-entered the legislature in 1955 as a PSP candidate, defeating the Congress opponent from Aligarh. On 16 February 1955, Malkhan Singh declared in Lucknow that he had rejoined the INC after the party agreed to pursue a socialistic pattern of society. He was elected as the President of the Aligarh DCC with one accord. Later, in 1957 he went on to be a Cabinet Minister with sports and industries portfolios.

== Legacy ==
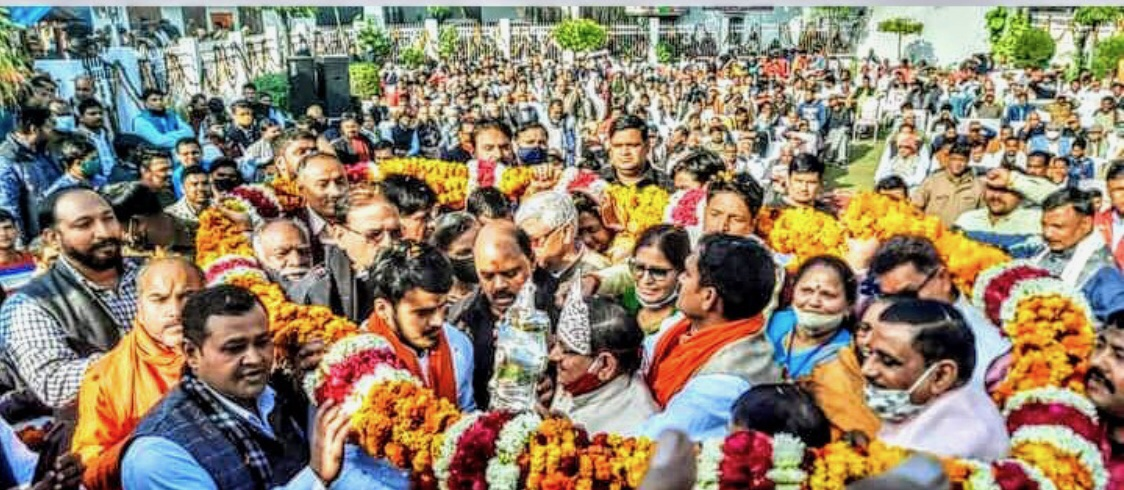
Crowds gather at annual festival commemorating Malkhan Singh's contributions to India's independence

Outside politics Thakur Malkhan Singh's activities were related primarily to benefiting education. He taught in, managed and was the founder of various high schools and colleges. The Malkhan Singh District Hospital, a facility in Aligarh and Malkhan Nagar, a government colony were named after him. For all of his contribution to the freedom struggle, he was bestowed the title of Aligarh Kesari, or lion of Aligarh. An honour event is organized annually in Aligarh on his birth anniversary to commemorate his contributions to India's independence movement. A memorial society, the Swatantra Senani Aligarh Kesari Thakur Malkhan Singh Memorial Jana Kalyan Samiti has been conducting various charitable social works and programs in his memory for the past 60 years.

== Personal life ==
Malkhan Singh married Sidhyawati Devi, who hailed from an aristocratic Zamindar family. They were survived by three daughters: Sarla Chauhan, Sushila Singh Chauhan, Dr. Urmila Kushwaha (a reputed doctor of medicine in Kanpur, Uttar Pradesh) and two sons: Virendra Singh Bhal and Nripendra Singh Bhal, PhD.

== Gallery ==
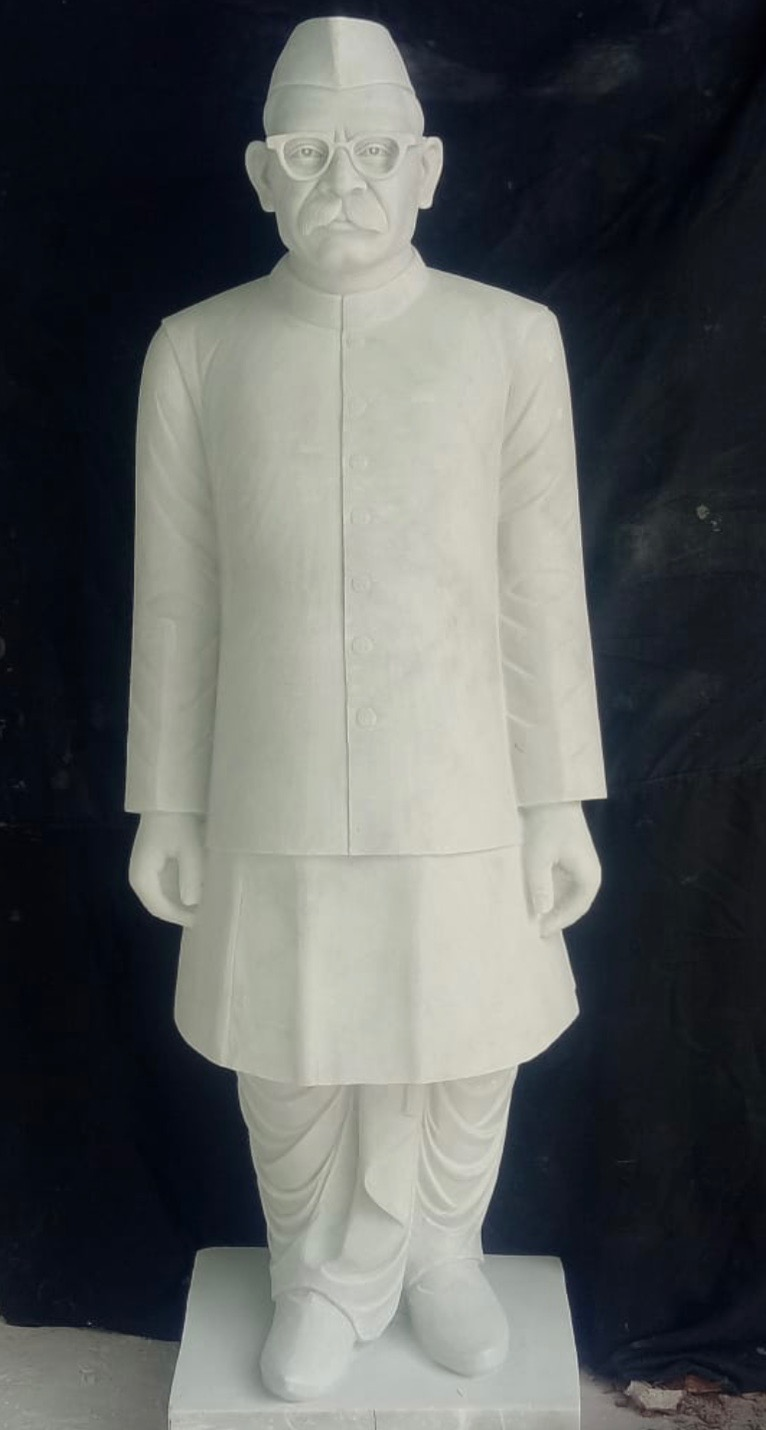
Statue of Malkhan Singh erected at Malkhan Vatika (Garden) at Ghantaghar (Clock Tower) Aligarh

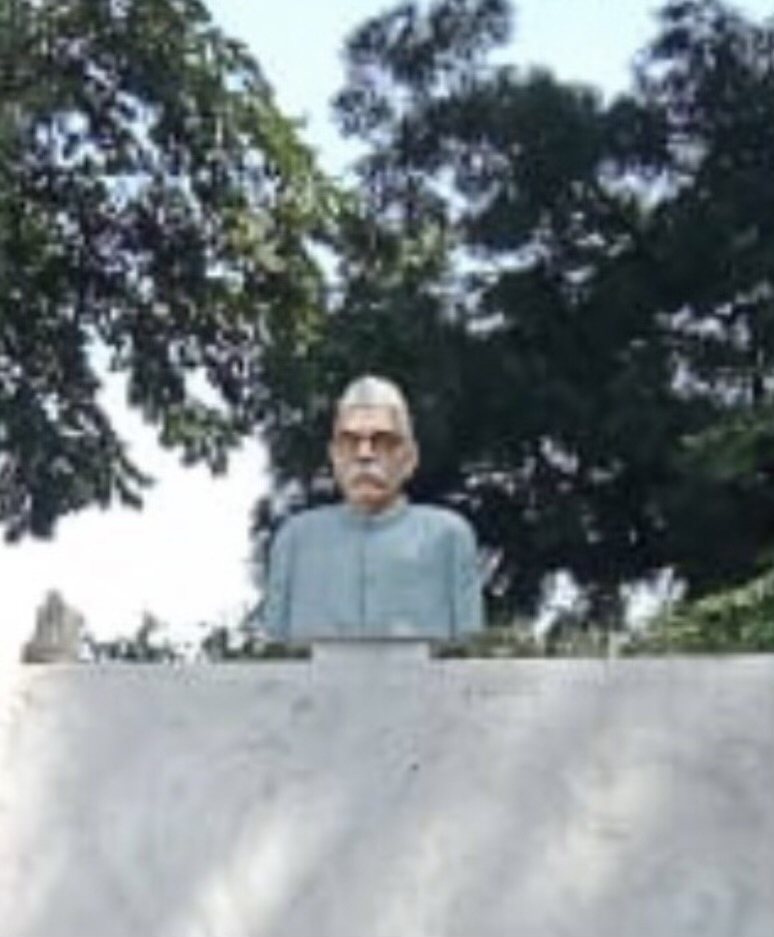
Bust of Malkhan Singh in Aligarh

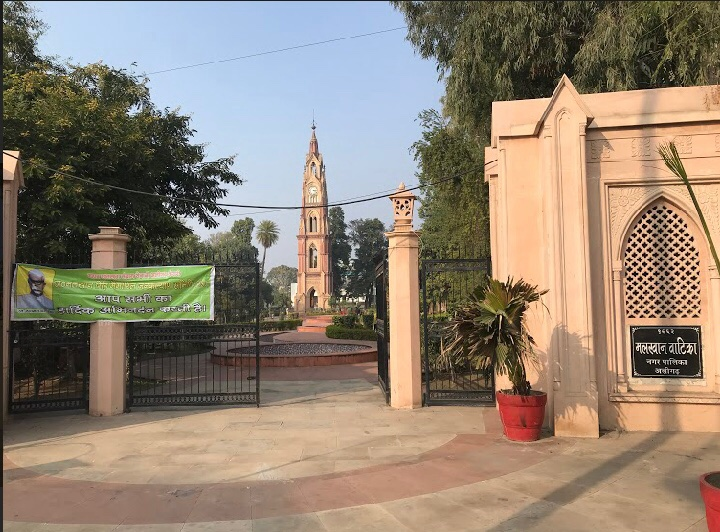
A sign at the gate of Malkhan Singh Memorial Garden in Aligarh inviting to the annual homage event celebrating the freedom fighter's contributions to India's independence movement

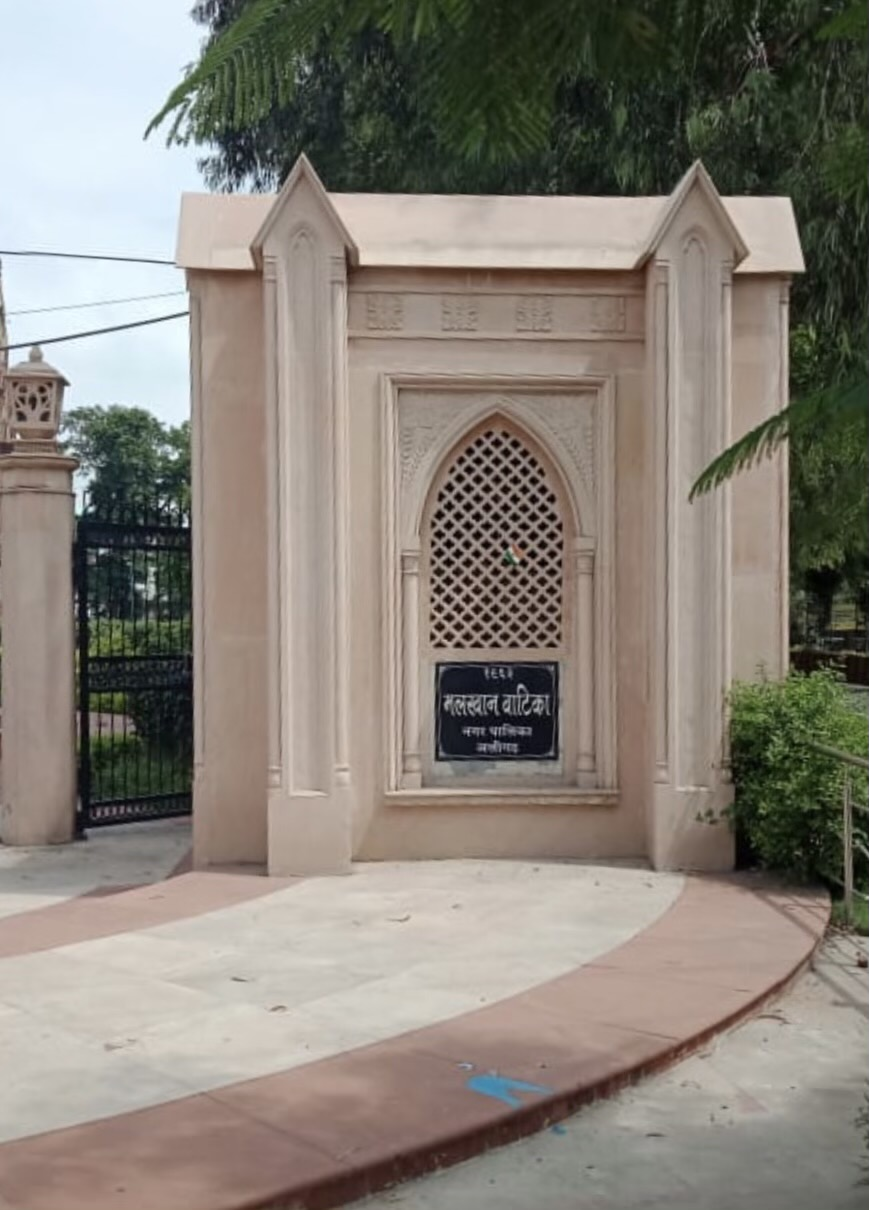
Gate to Malkhan Singh Memorial Garden in Aligarh
