= Hasayan =

- Town
- Location in Uttar Pradesh, India
- Coordinates: 27°37′N 78°16′E
- Country: India
- State: Uttar Pradesh
- District: Hathras

Population (2001)
  - Total: 5,584

Languages
  - Official: Hindi
- Time zone: UTC+5:30 (IST)

Hasayan is a town and nagar panchayat located in Hathras district in the Indian state of Uttar Pradesh. It also has Police Station, Block Development office. Industry is mainly seasonal Perfume extraction in month of November-February (Khas Chrysopogon_zizanioides) and March-May (Rose Rosa rubiginosa)

== Demographics ==
As of 2001 India census, Hasayan had a population of 5584. Males constitute 54% of the population and females 46%. Hasayan has an average literacy rate of 50%, lower than the national average of 59.5%: male literacy is 61%, and female literacy is 37%. In Hasayan, 20% of the population is under 6 years of age.
