= Kishan Lal Diler =

Indian politician

- Constituency: Hathras

Personal details
- Born: 1 January 1931 Aligarh, Uttar Pradesh
- Died: 2008 (aged 77) Aligarh, Uttar Pradesh
- Party: BJP
- Spouse: Shanti Devi
- Children: 2 sons and 1 daughter

Kishan Lal Diler (1931–2008) was an Indian politician. He stood for the 2004 Lok Sabha elections on the Bharatiya Janata Party (BJP) ticket from Hathras (MP from 1996 to 2009). He died at Aligarh.
