= Anjula Singh Mahaur =

Indian politician

Member of the Uttar Pradesh Legislative Assembly
- Incumbent
- Assumed office 2022
- Constituency: Hathras

Personal details
- Party: Bharatiya Janata Party

Anjula Singh Mahaur (born 1970) is an Indian politician from Uttar Pradesh. She is a member of the 18th Uttar Pradesh Assembly representing the Hathras Assembly constituency which is reserved for SC community in Hathras district. She won the 2022 Uttar Pradesh Legislative Assembly election on Bharatiya Janata Party ticket.

== Early life and education ==
Singh is from Agra Cantonment. She completed her LLB in 1991 at D.S. College Aligarh, affiliated with Agra University, Agra. She married Sudhir Kumar Mahaur, a government employee.

== Career ==
Singh won the 2022 Uttar Pradesh Legislative Assembly election from Hathras Assembly constituency representing Bharatiya Janata Party. She polled 1,54,655 votes and defeated Sanjeev Kumar of BSP by a huge margin of 1,00,856 votes.
