= Hathras Fort =

Fort in Uttar Pradesh, India

The Hathras Fort, (also known as Raja Dayaram Fort and Shri Dauji Mandi) was constructed by Raja Dayaram Singh in the 18th century. It is located in the city of Hathras in Uttar Pradesh. Commonly known as Kila Gate, Hathras Fort is a popular tourist site, although it is not registered as a tourist place in Uttar Pradesh.

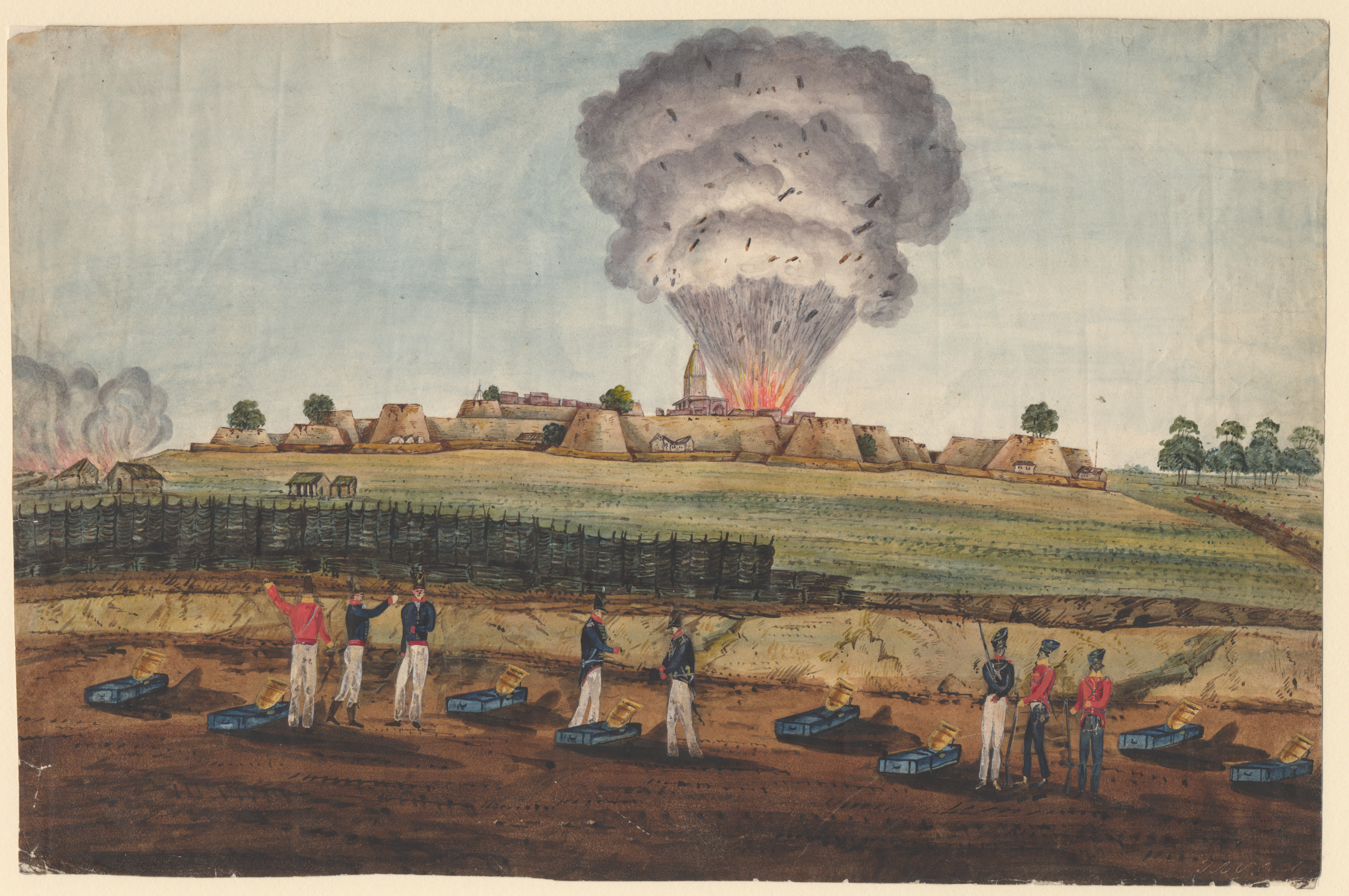
Battle of Hutrass, March 1817

The Siege of Hathras also known as the Hathras Rebellion, took place at the fort between Raja Dayaram, ruler of Hathras, and the British East India Company in February 1817. In the late 20th century, the 200 year old heritage building was turned into a temple of Hindu Lord, Dauji.
