= Javed Ali Khan (politician) =

Indian National Congress politician

Kunwar Javed Ali Khan (1935-2016) was an Indian National Congress politician from Sadabad, Uttar Pradesh, India.

He was born in noted Nawab of Sadabad family and was son of Ashraf Ali Khan. His father was also a long time politician representing Sadabad assembly in pre-independence in 1939 and later in 1969.

Javed Ali was elected as an Indian National Congress party candidate from Sadabad to Uttar Pradesh Legislative Assembly in 1980, during which time he also served as Minister of Public Works Department of Uttar Pradesh under Chief Ministership of Vishwanath Pratap Singh for years 1980-83. In 1999, he contested election as Congress candidate from Jalesar but did not win.

He died at his home in Sadabad on 22 December 2016.
