= Birendra Singh Rana =

Indian politician

Member of Legislative Assembly [[Member of State Executive Committee, Bharatiya Janata Party, Uttar Pradesh]]
- Incumbent
- Assumed office 11 March 2017

Hathras District President Bharatiya Janata Party
- In office 11 Nov 2014 – 10 Jan 2016

Kshetriya Sanyojak (Jaivik Urja Prakosht) Braj
- In office 2013–2014

Personal details
- Born: 1 November 1958 (age 67) Hathras, Uttar Pradesh, India
- Party: Bharatiya Janata Party
- Website: https://www.facebook.com/bsranabjp/

Birendra Singh Rana (born 1 November 1958) is a politician and a leader of Bharatiya Janata Party, from the Sikandra Rao constituency of Hathras district in Uttar Pradesh. Currently, he is Member of Legislative Assembly (India) from Sikandra Rao and Member of State Executive Committee of BJP Uttar Pradesh.

Birendra Singh Rana (born 1 November 1958) is a politician and a leader of Bharatiya Janata Party, from the Sikandra Rao constituency of Hathras district in Uttar Pradesh. Currently, he is Member of Legislative Assembly (India) from Sikandra Rao and Member of State Executive Committee of BJP Uttar Pradesh.

== Early life and education ==
He was born on 1 November 1958 in Bisana, a village in Hathras district. As his father died a year after his birth, he grew up in poor circumstances and economic hardships. He could not complete his education and had to work at a very young age to earn his portion of bread.

== Political career ==
He joined BJP in 1980's where he worked as a ground level karyakarta for decades. He was appointed the Kshetriya Sanyojak of the Braj Kshetra by UP BJP in 2013. Later in 2014, he was appointed to the post of District President. On 1 July 2016 he was appointed the Member of the State Executive Committee of BJP Uttar Pradesh by the then State President Keshav Prasad Maurya. He was elected as MLA from Sikandra Rao constituency on 11 March 2017.
