= City Montessori School =

Private school in Uttar Pradesh, India

Location
- Lucknow, Uttar Pradesh; India; 26°47′23″N 80°53′39″E

Information
- Type: Private
- Motto: Jai Jagat (Victory to the World)
- Established: 1959; 67 years ago
- Founders: Jagdish Gandhi; Bharti Gandhi
- Grades: Pre-primary; I—XII
- Gender: Co-education
- Enrolment: 61,345 (August 2023)
- Language: English
- Campus type: Multi urban
- Affiliations: Council for the Indian School Certificate Examinations (CISCE); Cambridge Assessment International Education (CAIE)
- Website: cmseducation.org

The City Montessori School (CMS) is a private co-educational, English-medium pre-primary to secondary multi-campus school located in Lucknow, in the state of Uttar Pradesh, India. With an enrolment of 61,345 students as of 10 August 2023, the school was recognised by Guinness World Records as the world's largest school.

In 2014, the CMS Society was accredited by the United Nations Department of Public Information (UNDPI) as an affiliated non-governmental organisation (NGO), reflecting its engagement in global educational initiatives.

== Background ==
City Montessori School (CMS) was established in 1959 by educationist Jagdish Gandhi and his wife, Dr. Bharti Gandhi, in a single room at their residence in Lucknow. The school began with an initial enrolment of five students and a modest capital of ₹300. This inaugural campus, now designated as the Station Road Branch, remains a historic landmark in the institution's growth.

In 2002, CMS was awarded the UNESCO Prize for Peace Education for its emphasis on global unity and value-based education. Additionally, the school received the 'Hope of Humanity' Award from Dalai Lama, the spiritual leader of Tibetan Buddhism's Gelug ("Yellow Hat") school, in recognition of its contributions to fostering peace and harmony.

== In the news ==
The City Montessori School garnered media attention for its academic collaborations, controversies, and social initiatives. In 2013, CMS was designated as Uttar Pradesh's centre for the Scholastic Aptitude Test (SAT), a key requirement for admissions to U.S. universities.

A significant controversy arose in 2015 when CMS denied admission to 31 students from economically weaker sections (EWS) under the Right to Education Act (RTE). The school cited state RTE eligibility criteria, arguing that applicants were either below six years of age (the RTE defines children as aged 6–14), resided beyond a 1 km radius of the campus, or had private schools closer to their homes. Ramon Magsaysay Award recipient Sandeep Pandey protested this decision with a hunger strike, but mediation efforts between the school, administration, and activists failed. CMS subsequently challenged the state's directive in the Allahabad High Court. Following an interim order by the Supreme Court, the school admitted 13 eligible students in compliance with the ruling.

CMS has undertaken peace-building efforts during crises, such as promoting communal harmony after the 1992 Ayodhya riots. The school launched the Indo-Pak Children's Pen Friend Project to foster cross-border friendships between Indian and Pakistani students. In 2017, CMS students performed yoga at the United Nations Headquarters in New York to mark International Day of Yoga.

Fee hikes have drawn scrutiny over the years. For the 2017–18 academic session, CMS increased fees by 12%, following a 10% hike for most classes and up to 16% for nursery and kindergarten in 2013.

The school faced criticism in 2011 after a Class 10 student at its Mahanagar branch died by suicide, allegedly due to threats of public shaming by then-principal Nalini Sharad. A court ordered legal action against Sharad in 2013, rejecting the initial police inquiry. The case remains sub judice, and Sharad retired the same year.

In August 2018, the parents of a female Class 3 student accused boys at the Aliganj campus molested her over a "Truth and Dare" game. Protests followed and the case was solved without any external legal interference.

In 2023, CMS revised its uniform (including socks and belts) for the first time in 33 years. After complaints of overpricing, the school introduced a helpline for parents to verify prices.

CMS's cultural and academic achievements include hosting the International Children’s Film Festival, organizing an international music concert with artists from 17 countries and 11 Indian states (in collaboration with ABRSM), and students securing distinction in CISCE (Council for the Indian School Certificate Examinations) board exams.

On November 10, 2025 while playing basketball at CMS's LDA Colony branch, a heavy basketball pole suddenly fell on a student, causing him a serious head injury. The approximate weight of the pole was 2 tons. The student had a broken skull and serious brain damage as a result.

== Campuses ==
CMS has twenty campuses across Lucknow. As of 2023, the major campuses were:

Campus name	Date established	Coordinates	Website
Aliganj I & II (Note: Affiliated with the Cambridge Assessment International Education (CAIE) and follow the IGCSE curriculum.)			cmseducation.org/campuses/aliganj1
Anand Nagar			
Asharfabad			
Ayodhya Road			
Chowk	1961	26°48′42″N 80°57′37″E	cmseducation.org/campuses/chowk
Gomti Nagar I & II	1991		cmseducation.org/branches/gomti
Golf City			
Indira Nagar I & II	1982	26°53′14″N 80°59′44″E	cmseducation.org/campuses/indiranagar
Jopling Road			
Kanpur Road	1993	26°47′24″N 80°53′34″E	cmseducation.org/branches/kanpur.html
Mahanagar			
Rajajipuram I & II			
Rajendra Nagar I & II			
Research Designs & Standards Organisation (RDSO)	1964		cmseducation.org/branches/rdso.html
Shalimar OneWorld			
Station Road	1959	26°47′23″N 80°53′39″E	cmseducation.org/campuses/stationrd

== Notable alumni ==
- Gopal Bagley – diplomat; served as High Commissioner of India to Sri Lanka
- Celina Jaitly – actress and former Miss India
- Urfi Javed – internet personality, television actress
- Shubhanshu Shukla – astronaut; mission pilot for Axiom Mission 4 to ISS, shortlisted for Indian Human Spaceflight Programme
- Sudhanshu Trivedi – politician and national spokesperson, Bharatiya Janata Party (BJP)

== Gallery ==
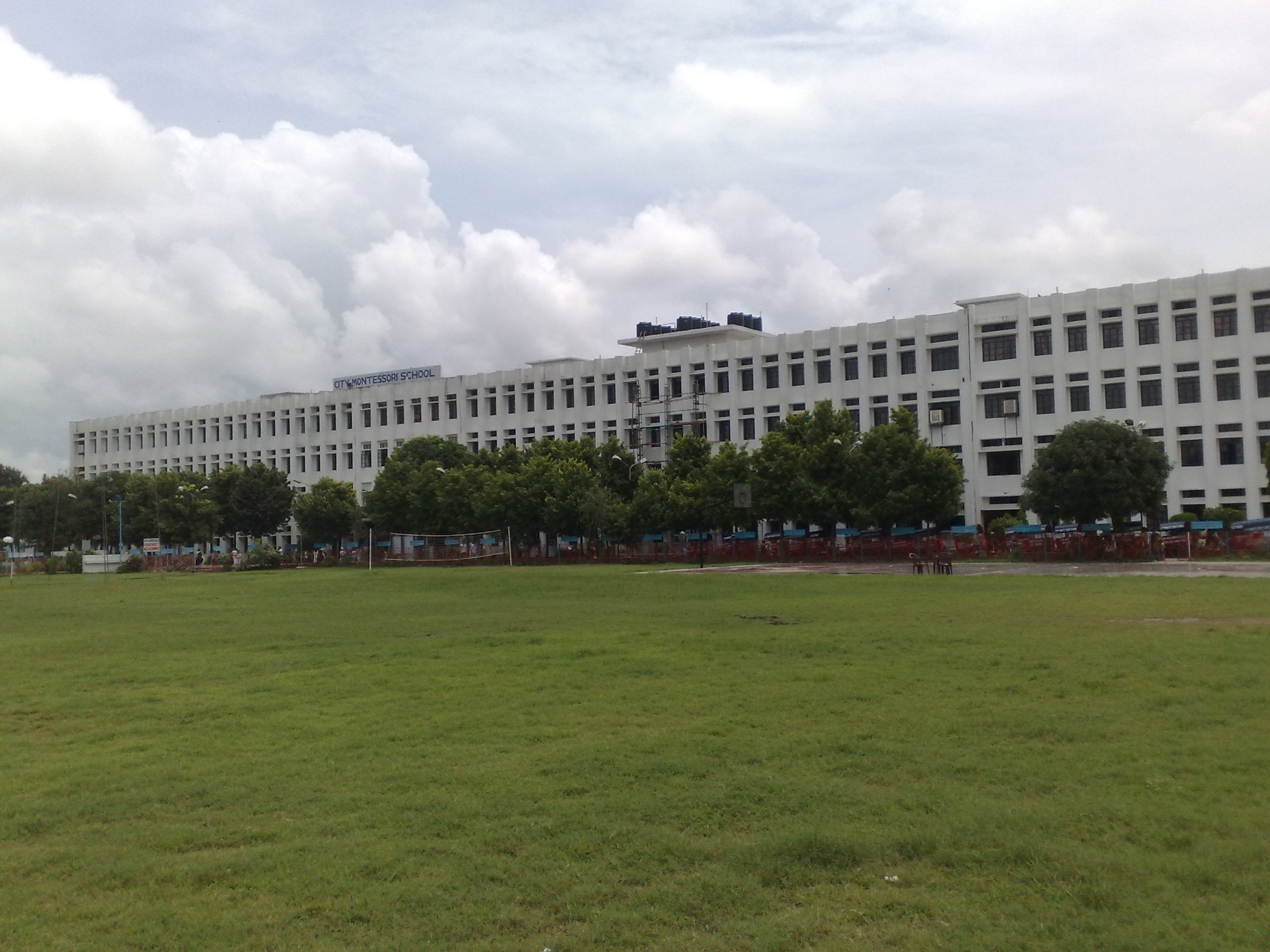
The academic block at the Kanpur Road campus

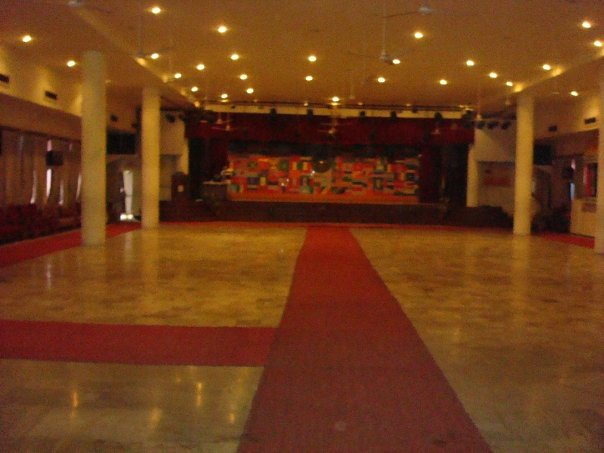
The auditorium at the Gomti Nagar campus
