= Genda Lal Chaudhary =

Indian politician

MLA, 16th Legislative Assembly
- In office March 2012 – March 2017
- Preceded by: Ramveer Upadhayay
- Constituency: Hathras

MLA, 15th Legislative Assembly
- In office May 2007 – March 2012
- Preceded by: Devki Nandan
- Succeeded by: None
- Constituency: Sasni

Personal details
- Born: 15 September 1951 (age 75) Aligarh district
- Party: Bahujan Samaj Party (2007-2016); Bharatiya Janata Party (2016-present)
- Spouse: Kusum Chaudhary (wife)
- Children: 3 sons
- Parent: Gokul Chandra (father)
- Education: D. S. Degree college, Aligarh
- Profession: Farmer & politician

Genda Lal Chaudhary is an Indian politician and a member of the 16th Legislative Assembly of India. He represents the Hathras constituency of Uttar Pradesh and is a member of the Bahujan Samaj Party political party.

== Early life and education ==
Genda Lal Chaudhary was born in Aligarh district. He attended the D. S. Degree college, Aligarh and attained Bachelor of Arts degree.

== Political career ==
Genda Lal Chaudhary has been a MLA for two terms. He represented the Hathras constituency and was a member of the Bahujan Samaj Party political party. On 16 December 2016, Chaudhary crossed the floor and joined the Bharatiya Janata Party.

== Posts held ==
#	From	To	Position	Comments
01	2012	Incumbent	Member, 16th Legislative Assembly	
02	2007	2012	Member, 15th Legislative Assembly	

Sub divisional officer (mtnl)

== See also ==
- Aligarh (Assembly constituency)
- Sixteenth Legislative Assembly of Uttar Pradesh
- Uttar Pradesh Legislative Assembly
