= Sarika Devendra Singh Baghel =

Sarika Singh
- Born: 9 August 1980 (age 45); Etawah, Uttar Pradesh
- Origin: Indian
- Occupation: Politician

Sarika Singh (born 9 August 1980) is an Indian politician and member of Lok Sabha. She was elected to 15th Lok Sabha from Hathras in Uttar Pradesh as a candidate of Rashtriya Lok Dal (RLD). She has joined Bharatiya Janata Party.

She was nominated as a Lok Sabha Candidate of Samajwadi Party from Agra. However, she was expelled from the party after her husband was overheard calling Party Chief Mulayam Singh Yadav an Old Man.
