= Ashraf Ali Khan (politician, born 1898) =

Indian politician and independence activist

Ashraf Ali Khan (1898–1975) also known as Kunwar (Note: Kunwar stands for Raj Kunwar or Prince. During lifetime of Nawabs, the heir apparent was also known as Kunwar.) Mohammad Ashraf Ali Khan was an Indian National Congress politician and independence activist from Sadabad, Uttar Pradesh, India.

He was zamindar of Sadabad and also known as Nawab of Sadabad.

Before independence of India, he was elected as member of United Province Legislative Assembly in year 1939 as an Indian National Congress party candidate.

After independence of India, he contested election in 1969 and was elected as an Indian National Congress party candidate from Sadabad to Uttar Pradesh Legislative Assembly.

He founded a college at Sadabad named Sadabad Inter College in 1950.

His son Javed Ali Khan was also an Indian National Congress politician, who also served as Minister of Uttar Pradesh Government, winning election in 1980 from Sadabad.
