= Nardeo Snatak =

Indian politician (born 1917)

Member of Parliament, Lok Sabha
- In office 1952–1967
- Constituency: Aligarh (1st–2nd); Hathras (3rd–4th)

Personal details
- Born: September 1917 Bela village, Etawah district, United Provinces, British India
- Died: unknown
- Occupation: Politician

Nardeo Snatak (born September 1917, date of death unknown) was an Indian politician in the state of Uttar Pradesh who was a member of 1st Lok Sabha, representing the Aligarh constituency. He was re-elected to the 2nd Lok Sabha. Snatak was elected to 3rd and 4th Lok Sabha from the constituency of Hathras.

Snatak was born at Bela village, Etawah district in September 1917. He is deceased.
