= Ramveer Upadhyay =

Indian politician (1957–2022)

MLA, Uttar Pradesh Legislative Assembly
- In office March 2017 – 10 March 2022
- Preceded by: Devendra Agrawal
- Succeeded by: Pradeep Chaudhari 'Guddu'
- Constituency: Sadabad

MLA, Uttar Pradesh Legislative Assembly
- In office March 2012 – 10 March 2017
- Preceded by: Devendra AgrawalYashpal Singh Chauhan
- Succeeded by: Birendra Singh Rana
- Constituency: Sikandra Rao

MLA, Uttar Pradesh Legislative Assembly
- In office May 2007 – March 2012
- Preceded by: Himself
- Succeeded by: Genda Lal Chaudhary
- Constituency: Hathras

MLA, Uttar Pradesh Legislative Assembly
- In office February 2002 – May 2007
- Preceded by: Himself
- Succeeded by: Himself
- Constituency: Hathras

MLA, Uttar Pradesh Legislative Assembly
- In office October 1996 – March 2002
- Preceded by: Rajveer Singh
- Succeeded by: Himself
- Constituency: Hathras

Personal details
- Born: 1 August 1957 Bamauli, Uttar Pradesh, India
- Died: 2 September 2022 (aged 65) Agra, Uttar Pradesh, India
- Party: Bhartiya Janta Party
- Spouse: Seema Upadhyay (m. 1985)
- Children: 3
- Education: Meerut University
- Profession: Agriculturalist, lawyer

Ramveer Upadhyay (1 August 1957 – 2 September 2022) was an Indian politician and a member of the 17th Legislative Assembly of the state of Uttar Pradesh, India. He represented the Sadabad constituency of Uttar Pradesh as a member of the Bahujan Samaj Party (BSP) political party. Previously he represented the Sikandra Rao and Hathras constituencies, being member of the assembly four times in the process. On 14 January 2022, he resigned from the Bahujan Samaj Party and on 15 January 2022, he joined the Bharatiya Janata Party (BJP).

== Personal life ==
Upadhyay was born in a Sanadhya Brahmin family of Bamauli Village in Hathras District of Uttar Pradesh to Ram Charan Upadhyay. He attained Bachelor of Laws degree from Meerut University. Upadhyay married Seema Upadhyay on 14 February 1985, with whom he had two daughters and a son. He was a lawyer and agriculturalist by profession. Upadhyay died from cancer on 2 September 2022, at the age of 65.

== Political career ==
Upadhyay was a MLA for five terms. He represented the Sikandra Rao constituency as a member of the Bahujan Samaj Party political party. From 2017, he represented the Sadabad constituency.

== Positions held ==
Year	Description
1996 - 2002	Elected to 13th Uttar Pradesh Legislative Assembly: Cabinet Minister for Transport, Power (Mar - Oct 1997)
2002 -2007	Elected to 14th Uttar Pradesh Legislative Assembly (2nd Term): Minister for Power, Medical Education (May 2002 - Aug 2003)
2007 - 2012	Elected to 15th Uttar Pradesh Legislative Assembly (3rd Term): Minister for Power (May 2007 - Mar 2012)
2012 - 2017	Elected to 16th Uttar Pradesh Legislative Assembly (4th Term)
2017 - 2022	Elected to 17th Uttar Pradesh Legislative Assembly (5th Term)

== See also ==
- Sikandra Rao
- Sixteenth Legislative Assembly of Uttar Pradesh
- Uttar Pradesh Legislative Assembly
