= Sikandra Rao =

- Town
- Location in Uttar Pradesh, India Sikandra Rao (India)
- Coordinates: 27°42′N 78°24′E
- Country: India
- State: Uttar Pradesh
- Division: Aligarh
- District: Hathras

Government
  - Type: Municipal Council
  - Body: Sikandra Rao Municipal Council
  - Municipal Chairperson: Mohammed Musheer (AIMIM)
  - MLA: Birendra Singh Rana (BJP)

Population (2011)
  - Total: 46,038

Languages
  - Official: Hindi

Demographics
  - Literacy: 64.99%
  - Sex Ratio: 914
- Time zone: UTC+5:30 (IST)
- PIN: 204215
- Vehicle registration: UP-86

Sikandra Rao (Hindi pronunciation: [sɪkən̪d̪ɾaː ɾaːʋ]) is a town in Hathras district of Uttar Pradesh. It is one of the three assembly constituencies of the district and a Municipal board. The current MLA from the constituency is senior BJP leader Birendra Singh Rana.The town is connected to the cities of Aligarh and Etah by NH-34 and to the city of Agra by NH-21. The nearest airport is Agra Airport.

== Demographics ==
According to 2011 census Sikandra Rao has a population of 46,038.and according to 2023 project population is 1,72,865 Males constitute nearly 52%, and females constitute nearly 48% of the population. 14% of the population is under 6 years of age.
