= Pradeep Singh =

Indian politician

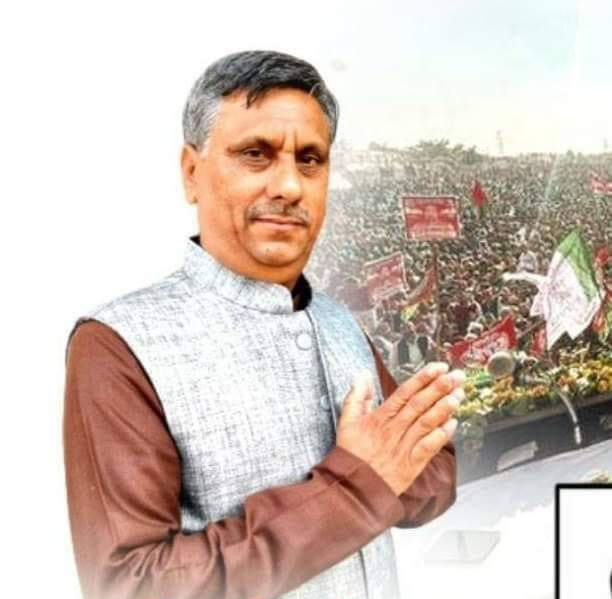
- Pradeep Singh (Guddu Chaudhary)

Member of the Uttar Pradesh Legislative Assembly
- Incumbent
- Assumed office 10 March 2022
- Preceded by: Ramveer Upadhyay
- Constituency: Sadabad

Personal details
- Party: Rashtriya Lok Dal
- Other political affiliations: National Democratic Alliance (2024–present)
- Parent: Keran Singh (father) Santosh Chaudhary (brother)

Pradeep Singh (Guddu Chaudhary) is an Indian politician from Uttar Pradesh. He is a member of the Uttar Pradesh Legislative Assembly from Sadabad representing Rashtriya Lok Dal.

In 2022, A Hathras court sentenced Pradeep Singh, alias Guddu Chaudhary, to two months in prison and a fine of ₹1,100. The court convicted and sentenced MLA Pradeep Singh for violating the Model Code of Conduct and failing to adhere to COVID-19 protocols during the 2022 assembly elections.
