= Aligarh division =

Administrative division of Uttar Pradesh, India

Coordinates: 27.8906°N 78.0760°E

- Interactive map of Aligarh division
- Country: India
- State: Uttar Pradesh
- Time zone: UTC+5:30 (Indian Standard Time)
- Postal Index Number: 20XXXX

Aligarh division

Aligarh division is one of the 18 administrative geographical units (i.e. division) of the northern Indian state of Uttar Pradesh. Aligarh city is the divisional headquarters.

This division consisted of all the districts of the lower Doab:-

- Aligarh
- Etah
- Hathras
- Kasganj

== Education ==
Aligarh Muslim University is the premier educational institution in this area.

== See also ==
- Districts of Uttar Pradesh
