= Hathras Assembly constituency =

Constituency of the Uttar Pradesh legislative assembly in India

Hathras
- Constituency No. 78 for the Uttar Pradesh Legislative Assembly

Constituency details
- Country: India
- Region: North India
- State: Uttar Pradesh
- District: Hathras
- Established: 1951
- Total electors: 346,878 (2012)
- Reservation: None

Member of Legislative Assembly
- 18th Uttar Pradesh Legislative Assembly
- Incumbent Anjula Singh Mahaur
- Party: Bharatiya Janata Party
- Elected year: 2022
- Preceded by: Hari Shankar Mahor

Hathras Assembly constituency (Hindi pronunciation: [ɦaːt̪ʰ.ɾəs]) is one of the 403 constituencies of the Uttar Pradesh Legislative Assembly, India. It is a part of the Hathras district and one of the five assembly constituencies in the Hathras Lok Sabha constituency. First election in this assembly constituency was held in 1952 after the "DPACO (1951)" (delimitation order) was passed in 1951. After the "Delimitation of Parliamentary and Assembly Constituencies Order" was passed in 2008, the constituency was assigned identification number 78.

== Wards / Areas ==
Extent of Hathras Assembly constituency is Sasni Tehsil; KC Hathras, Hathras MB & Mendu NP of Hathras Tehsil.

== Members of the Legislative Assembly ==
#	Term	Name	Party	From	To	Days	Comments	Ref
01	01st Vidhan Sabha	Nand Kumar Deo Vashistha	Indian National Congress	May-1952	Mar-1957	1,776	-	
02	02nd Vidhan Sabha	Nand Kumar Deo Vashistha	Indian National Congress	Apr-1957	Mar-1962	1,800	-	
03	03rd Vidhan Sabha	Nand Kumar Deo Vashistha	Indian National Congress	Mar-1962	Mar-1967	1,828	-	
04	04th Vidhan Sabha	R. S. Singh	Bharatiya Jana Sangh	Mar-1967	Apr-1968	402	-	
05	05th Vidhan Sabha	Prem Chandra Sharma	Indian National Congress	Feb-1969	Mar-1974	1,832	-	
06	06th Vidhan Sabha	Narayan Hari Sharma	Indian National Congress	Mar-1974	Apr-1977	1,153	-	
07	07th Vidhan Sabha	Ram Saran Singh	Janata Party	Jun-1977	Feb-1980	969	-	
08	08th Vidhan Sabha	Suraj Bhan	Janata Party (Secular)	Jun-1980	Mar-1985	1,735	-	
09	09th Vidhan Sabha	Narain Hari Sharma	Indian National Congress	Mar-1985	Nov-1989	1,725	-	
10	10th Vidhan Sabha	Ram Saran Singh	Janata Dal	Dec-1989	Apr-1991	488	-	
11	11th Vidhan Sabha	Ram Saran Singh	Janata Dal	Jun-1991	Dec-1992	533	-	
12	12th Vidhan Sabha	Rajveer Singh	Bharatiya Janata Party	Dec-1993	Oct-1995	693	-	
13	13th Vidhan Sabha	Ramveer Upadhayay	Bahujan Samaj Party	Oct-1996	May-2002	1,967	-	
14	14th Vidhan Sabha	Ramveer Upadhayay	Bahujan Samaj Party	Feb-2002	May-2007	1,902	-	
15	15th Vidhan Sabha	Ramveer Upadhayay	Bahujan Samaj Party	May-2007	Mar-2012	1,762	-	
16	16th Vidhan Sabha	Genda Lal Chaudhary	Bahujan Samaj Party	Mar-2012	Mar-2017	-	-	
17	17th Vidhan Sabha	Hari Shankar Mahor	Bharatiya Janata Party	Mar-2017	Mar-2022			
18	18th Vidhan Sabha	Anjula Singh Mahaur	Bharatiya Janata Party	Mar-2022	Incumbent			

== Election results ==
=== 2027 ===
2027 Uttar Pradesh Legislative Assembly election: Hathras
Party	Candidate	Votes	%	±%
INDIA				
NDA				
BSP				
NOTA	None of the above			
Majority				
Turnout				
gain from		Swing		

=== 2022 ===
2022 Uttar Pradesh Legislative Assembly election: Hathras
Party	Candidate	Votes	%	±%
BJP	Anjula Singh Mahaur	154,655	58.79	+2.69
BSP	Sanjeev Kumar	53,799	20.45	−6.03
SP	Braj Mohan Rahi	47,185	17.94	
INC	Kuldeep Kumar Singh	2,436	0.93	−10.51
NOTA	None of the above	1,771	0.67	+0.14
Majority		100,856	38.34	+8.72
Turnout		263,054	63.2	+1.18
BJP hold		Swing		

=== 2017 ===
2017 Uttar Pradesh Legislative Assembly Election: Hathras
Party	Candidate	Votes	%	±%
BJP	Hari Shankar Mahor	133,840	56.1	
BSP	Braj Mohan Rahi	63,179	26.48	
INC	Rajesh Raj Jeevan	27,301	11.44	
MD	Nekse Lal	5,349	2.24	
RLD	Genda Lal Chaudhary	3,616	1.52	
NOTA	None of the above	1,256	0.53	
Majority		70,661	29.62	
Turnout		238,554	62.02	
BJP gain from BSP		Swing		

=== 2012 ===
16th Vidhan Sabha: 2012 General Elections

2012 General Elections: Hathras
Party	Candidate	Votes	%	±%
BSP	Genda Lal Chaudhary	59,161	28.88	−
BJP	Rajesh Kumar	50,488	24.65	−
INC	Rajesh Raj Jivan	30,186	22.6	−
	Remainder 11 candidates	48,896	23.89	−
Majority		8,673	4.23	−
Turnout		204,829	59.05	−
BSP hold		Swing		

== See also ==
- Hathras district
- Hathras Lok Sabha constituency
- Sixteenth Legislative Assembly of Uttar Pradesh
- Uttar Pradesh Legislative Assembly
