= Hathras district =

- District of Uttar Pradesh
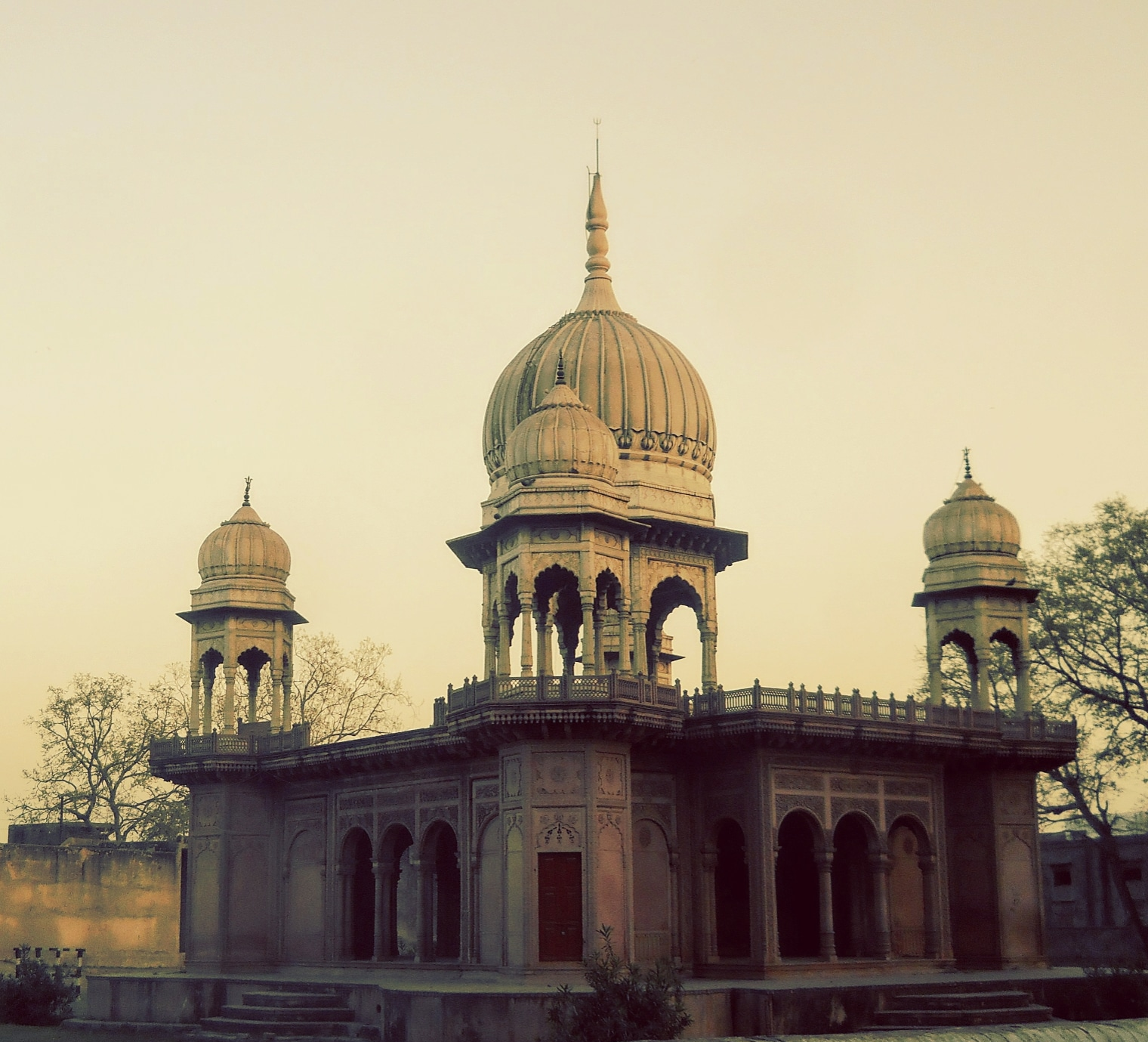
- Hathras Tample

- Location of Hathras district in Uttar Pradesh
- Country: India
- State: Uttar Pradesh
- Division: Aligarh
- Headquarters: Hathras

Government
  - Lok Sabha constituencies: Hathras

Area
  - Total: 1,840 km^{2} (710 sq mi)

Population (2011)
  - Total: 1,564,708
  - Density: 850/km^{2} (2,200/sq mi)

Demographics
  - Literacy: 71.6%
  - Sex ratio: 871
- Time zone: UTC+05:30 (IST)
- Website: https://hathras.nic.in/

Hathras district (Hindi pronunciation: [ɦaːt̪ʰ.ɾəs]; previously called Mahamaya Nagar district) is a district of Uttar Pradesh state of India. The city of Hathras is the district headquarters. Hathras district is a part of Aligarh division. The district occupies an area of 1,840 square kilometres (710 sq mi) and has a population of 1,564,708 as of the 2011 census.

== History ==
Hathras district was created on 3 May 1997 by incorporating parts of the Aligarh, Mathura, and Agra districts. It was originally named Mahamaya Nagar (named for Mayadevi, mother of the Buddha) and was renamed to Hathras district in 2012.

== Divisions ==
The district comprises four tehsils: Hathras, Sadabad, Sikandra Rao, and Sasni, which are further divided into seven blocks: Sasni, Hathras, Mursan, Sadabad, Sahpau, Hasanpur Baru, Sikandra Rao, and Hasayan.

There are three Vidhan Sabha constituencies in this district: Hathras, Sadabad, and Sikandra Rao. All of these are part of Hathras Lok Sabha constituency.

== Demographics ==
Historical population
| Year | Pop. | ±% |
|---|---|---|
| 1901 | 446,863 | — |
| 1911 | 420,999 | −5.8% |
| 1921 | 386,670 | −8.2% |
| 1931 | 424,376 | +9.8% |
| 1941 | 500,838 | +18.0% |
| 1951 | 563,186 | +12.4% |
| 1961 | 645,924 | +14.7% |
| 1971 | 761,244 | +17.9% |
| 1981 | 919,454 | +20.8% |
| 1991 | 1,126,918 | +22.6% |
| 2001 | 1,336,031 | +18.6% |
| 2011 | 1,564,708 | +17.1% |
Source: Census of India

Religions in Hathras district (2011)
| Religion | Percent |
| Hinduism | 89.30% |
| Islam | 10.19% |
| Other or not stated | 0.51% |
Distribution of religions

According to the 2011 census, Hathras district has a population of 1,564,708, roughly equal to the nation of Gabon. This gives it a ranking of 319th in India (out of a total of 640). The district has an area of 1,840 square kilometres (710 sq mi) and a population density of 850 inhabitants per square kilometre (2,200/sq mi). Its population growth rate over the decade 2001–2011 was 17.12%. Hathras has a sex ratio of 871 females for every 1,000 males, and a literacy rate of 60.2%. 21.27% of the population lived in urban areas. Scheduled Castes made up 24.77% of the population.

Languages of Hathras district (2011)
1. Hindi (98.2%)
2. Urdu (1.24%)
3. Others (0.60%)

At the time of the 2011 Census of India, 98.16% of the population in the district spoke Hindi and 1.24% Urdu as their first language. The local language is Braj.

== Transport ==
Four railway stations serve Hathras: Hathras Junction railway station, Hathras Road railway station, Hathras City railway station, and Hathras Kila railway station.

== Notable people ==
- Birendra Singh Rana (MLA)
- Kaka Hathrasi (Poet)
- Pradeep Kumar Singh (MLA)
- Raja Mahendra Pratap Singh. Indian independence activist, politician, social reformer, and educationist
- Ramveer Upadhyay (MLA)

== See also ==
- Chamarua
- Mai
- Mau Chirayal
