= Sasni =

- town
- Location in Uttar Pradesh, India
- Coordinates: 27.72°N 78.08°E
- Country: India
- State: Uttar Pradesh
- District: Hathras

Government
  - Body: Nagar panchyat
- Elevation: 181 m (594 ft)

Population (2001)
  - Total: 12,943

Languages
  - Official: Hindi
- Time zone: UTC+5:30 (IST)
- Postal code: 204216
- Vehicle registration: UP 86

Sasni is a town and a nagar panchayat in Hathras district in the Indian state of Uttar Pradesh.

== Demographics ==
As of 2001 India census, Sasni had a population of 12,943. Males constitute 53% of the population and females 47%. Sasni has an average literacy rate of 63%, higher than the national average of 59.5%: male literacy is 70%, and female literacy is 56%. In Sasni, 16% of the population is under 6 years of age.
