= Hathras =

- City
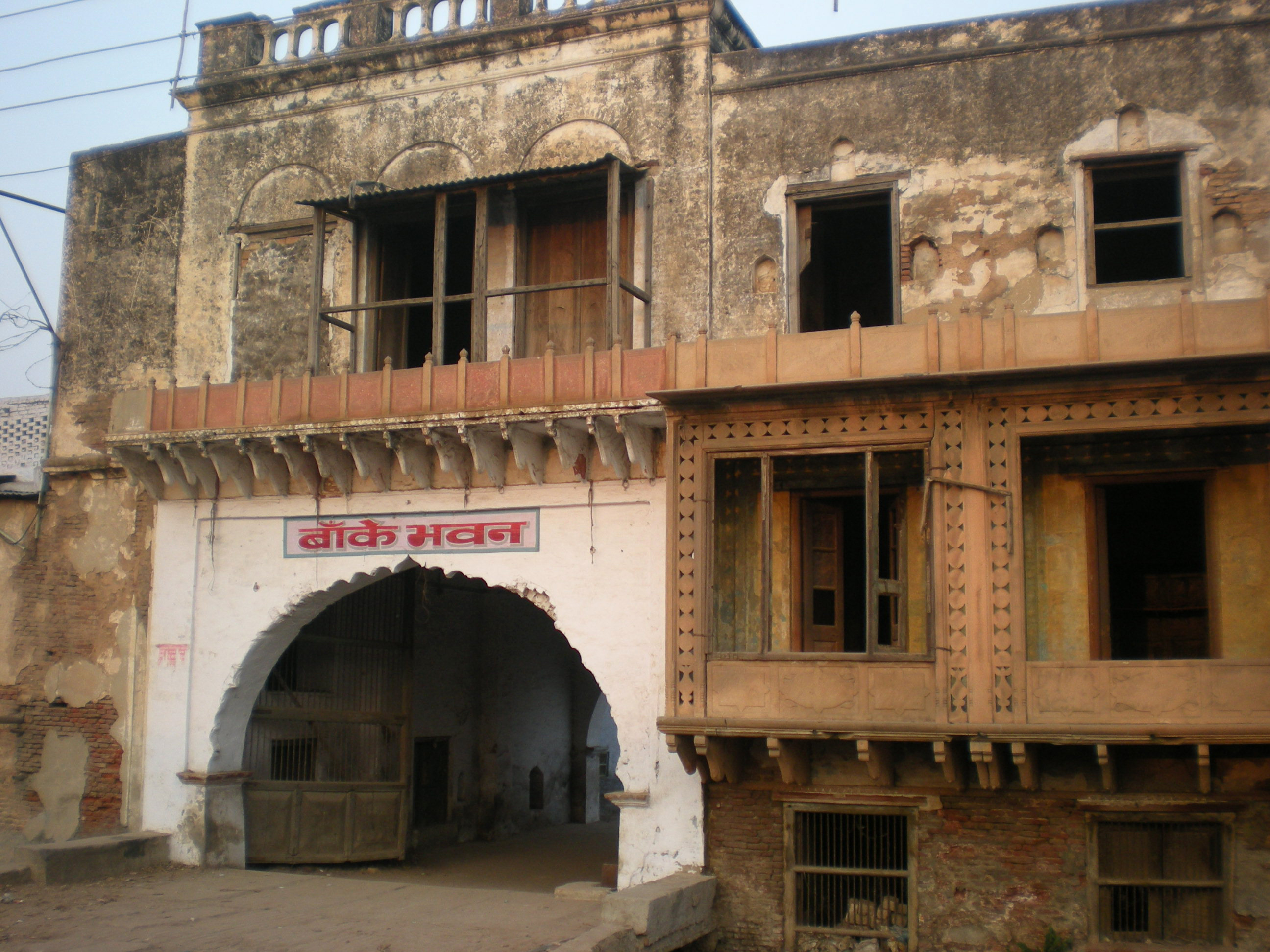
- Banke Bhawan, residence of poet Kaka Hathrasi
- Nickname: Asafoetida City
- Location within Uttar Pradesh Location within India
- Coordinates: 27.60°N 78.05°E
- Country: India
- State: Uttar Pradesh
- Division: Aligarh
- District: Hathras
- Established: 6 May 1997

Government
  - Type: Municipal Council
  - Body: Hathras Municipal Council
  - Municipal Chairperson: Shweta Chaudhary (BJP)
  - MLA: Anjula Singh Mahaur (BJP)

Area
  - Total: 142 km^{2} (55 sq mi)
- Elevation: 178 m (584 ft)

Population (2011)
  - Total: 160,909

Languages
  - Official: Hindi, Urdu
- Time zone: UTC+5:30 (IST)
- PIN: 204101
- Telephone code: 05722
- Vehicle registration: UP-86
- Sex ratio: 870 ♂/♀
- Website: hathras.nic.in

Hathras (Hindi pronunciation: [ɦaːt̪ʰ.ɾəs]) is a historical city in Uttar Pradesh, India. It is the headquarters of Hathras district, formed on 3 May 1997 by merging parts of Aligarh and Mathura. It is part of the Aligarh Division.

The primary spoken language is a dialect of Hindi, Braj Bhasha, which is closely related to Khariboli, one of several dialects spoken in the Delhi region. It is known for production of asafoetida.

== History ==
Near the end of the 18th century, the town of Hathras was held by a Thenua Jat chief, Raja Dayaram Singh, who constructed the Hathras Fort at the east end of the town. In 1817, the British besieged the fort, ultimately annexing the territory. Under British rule, Hathras rapidly rose to commercial importance, and for a while ranked second to Cawnpore (now Kanpur) among the trading centres of the Doab.

Hathras became a district on 6 May 1997 with the merging of some tehsils of Aligarh and Mathura. Hathras falls under the Braj region of Northern India and is famous for its industrial, literary, and cultural activities. It has been an industrial centre since the British ruled India.

== Administration ==
Hathras is the headquarters of the Hathras district. The Hathras district, formerly known as Mahamaya Nagar, was created in 1997 with the incorporation of parts of the Aligarh and Mathura districts.

The Hathras district has four subdivisions: Hathras, Sasni, Sikandra Rao, and Sadabad. The Hathras Lok Sabha constituency is reserved as a Schedule Caste seat. The district has three assembly constituencies.

The Hathras Assembly constituency has nine local bodies: Hathras, Sikandra Rao, Sasni, Sadabad, Mursan, Hasayan, Sahpau, Mendu, and Purdil Nagar.

== Geography ==
Hathras is located at 27.6°N 78.05°E. It has an average elevation of 185 metres (606 feet) and is situated on the Agra, Aligarh and Mathura, and Bareilly highway crossings. It is known for its extreme temperature variations. As of the 2001 Indian census, Hathras had a population of 123,243, of which 53% were male and 47% female. Hathras has an average literacy rate of 60%, higher than the national average of 59.5%, of which 66% being male and 53% being female. 14% of the population is under six years of age.

City	Distance from Hathras town	Direction from Hathras town
Aligarh	36 km	Towards the north
Mathura	41 km	Towards the west
Khair	46 km	Towards the northwest
Agra	53.8 km	Towards the south

== Climate ==
Hathras has a monsoon-influenced humid subtropical climate, typical of north-central India. Summers start in April ending around May. The monsoon season starts in late June, continuing until early October, bringing high humidity.

Climate data for Hathras
Month	Jan	Feb	Mar	Apr	May	Jun	Jul	Aug	Sep	Oct	Nov	Dec	Year
Mean daily maximum °F (°C)	71.6 (22.0)	82.0 (27.8)	92.1 (33.4)	102.2 (39.0)	108.7 (42.6)	104.0 (40.0)	95.0 (35.0)	93.2 (34.0)	96.6 (35.9)	94.1 (34.5)	73.4 (23.0)	76.1 (24.5)	114.1 (45.6)
Mean daily minimum °F (°C)	42.1 (5.6)	53.6 (12.0)	62.8 (17.1)	72.3 (22.4)	82.0 (27.8)	85.1 (29.5)	81.0 (27.2)	78.8 (26.0)	70.7 (21.5)	73.4 (23.0)	50.2 (10.1)	44.6 (7.0)	45.5 (7.5)
Source: India Meteorological Department

== Transport ==
Hathras is served by four railway stations: Hathras Junction railway station, Hathras Road railway station, Hathras City railway station, and Hathras Kila railway station. A new station on the dedicated Eastern Dedicated Freight Corridor was named New Hathras.

== Notable people ==
- Mahendra Chaudhary, MLA
- Kaka Hathrasi, poet
- Raja Mahendra Pratap Singh, king of Mursan Riyasat
- Thakur Malkhan Singh, freedom fighter
- Ramveer Upadhyay, former Cabinet Minister of Uttar Pradesh
