= Sadabad, India =

Sadabad
- Town
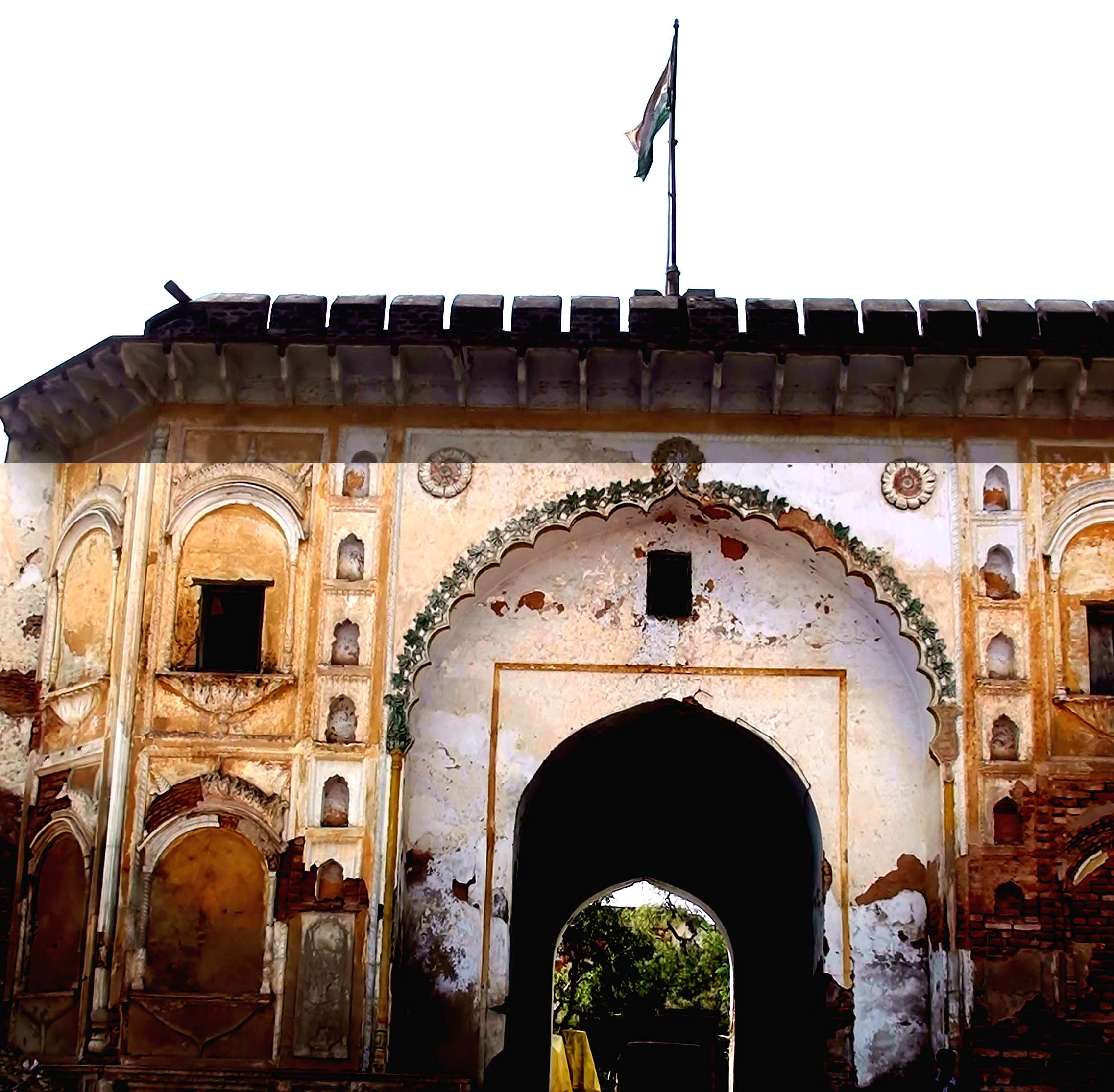
- Main gate of Sadabad fort

- Location in Uttar Pradesh, India Sadabad (India)
- Coordinates: 27°26′20.993″N 78°02′5.772″E
- Country: India
- State: Uttar Pradesh
- District: Hathras
- Elevation: 175 m (574 ft)

Population (2001)
  - Total: 31,737

Languages
  - Official: Hindi
  - Native: Braj Bhasha dialect
- Time zone: UTC+5:30 (IST)
- Postal code: 281306
- Vehicle registration: UP 86
- Website: up.gov.in

Sadabad is a town and a nagar panchayat in Hathras district in the Indian state of Uttar Pradesh.

== Geography ==
Sadabad is located at 27.45°N 78.05°E. It has an average elevation of 175 metres (574 feet).

== History ==
Sadabad was established by Saadullah Khan, a minister of Shah Jahan. It was part of Mathura District till 1997. It is a Jat-dominated area. It has an ancient fort known as "Kothi Ganj" and also a river known as "Karban river". Sadabad is located between 4 major cities of Uttar Pradesh: Agra, Mathura, Aligarh and Etah.

It is situated on a major connective road, NH 509, which links Agra to Aligarh via Sadabad, Hathras and Aligarh. It is well connected to Mathura and Raya. Some of its Village panchanyat are Karkoli, Khonda, Madaka, Bisawar, Naugawan, Kursanda, Vedai, Jaitai, Arotha, Tasinga, Dagsah, Mansya, Koopa etc.

It is famous for its sweet balushahi and bhalla(aaloo tikki).

== Nawabs of Sadabad ==
The Nawabs of Sadabad, belonging to Lalkhani, a Muslim Rajput clan, once were jagirdars of Sadabad. A few notable names are as below:-

- Kunwar Mohammad Ashraf Ali Khan, Member of Uttar Pradesh Legislative Assembly in 1952
- Kunwar Mustemand Ali Khan, Member of Uttar Pradesh Legislative Assembly in 1985,1989
- Kunwar Javed Ali Khan, Ex. Minister, U.P.
- Current Head Of Sadabad Royal Family Kunwar Mehmood Ali Khan ( Son Of Kunwar Javed Ali Khan )

== Demographics ==
As of the 2001 Census of India, Sadabad had a population of 31,737. Males constitute 53% of the population and females 47%. Sadabad has an average literacy rate of 53%, lower than the national average of 59.5%: male literacy is 61%, and female literacy is 43%. In Sadabad, 18% of the population is under 6 years of age. It is approximately 35 km from Agra, The city of Taj Mahal, on National highway 93. Being a semiurban area, economy is based mainly on potato farming.

Religions in Sadabad
Religion	Percent
Hindus	88%
Muslims	10%
Jains	1.0%
Others†	1.0%
Distribution of religions †Includes Sikhs (0.2%), Buddhists (<0.2%).

Sadabad town is characterized by its diverse caste demographics, which include Brahmins, Jats, Koris, Other Backward Castes (OBCs), Vaishyas, Sunaars, and Tyagis. Within the Brahmin community, Gautam Brahmins hold a majority, playing a significant role in the cultural and social fabric of the town. Jats are known for their agricultural heritage, while the Kori community has a notable presence in traditional crafts. Tyagis are respected for their contributions to education and land management, and the Vaishya community is prominent in trade and commerce. The Sunaars, skilled in metallurgy and jewelry-making, also add to the town's unique economic activities. Together, these communities form a vibrant and interconnected society, each contributing to Sadabad's historical and cultural identity.
