= Ghadar =

Ghadar may refer to:

- Indian Rebellion of 1857 also called Ghadar, revolt against British rule in India
- Ghadar Party, an expatriate Indian political party advocating for Indian independence from British rule founded in San Francisco
  - Hindustan Ghadar, the weekly publication of the Ghadar Party
  - Ghadar di gunj, a book compiling the writings of the Ghadar movement, banned by the British government in India
  - Ghadar Conspiracy, part of the World War I Indo-German conspiracy
- Gadar: Ek Prem Katha, a 2001 Indian action-drama film by Anil Sharma, set during the partition of India
  - Gadar 2: The Katha Continues, a 2023 Indian action drama film also by Sharma, sequel to the above set during the 1971 Indo-Pakistani War
- Ghadr-110, an Iranian ballistic missile
- Ghadir class submarine, a type of Iranian diesel submarine designed for littoral warfare

== See also ==
- Gadar (disambiguation)
- Gaddaar (disambiguation)
