= Prithvi Singh Azad =

Indian politician

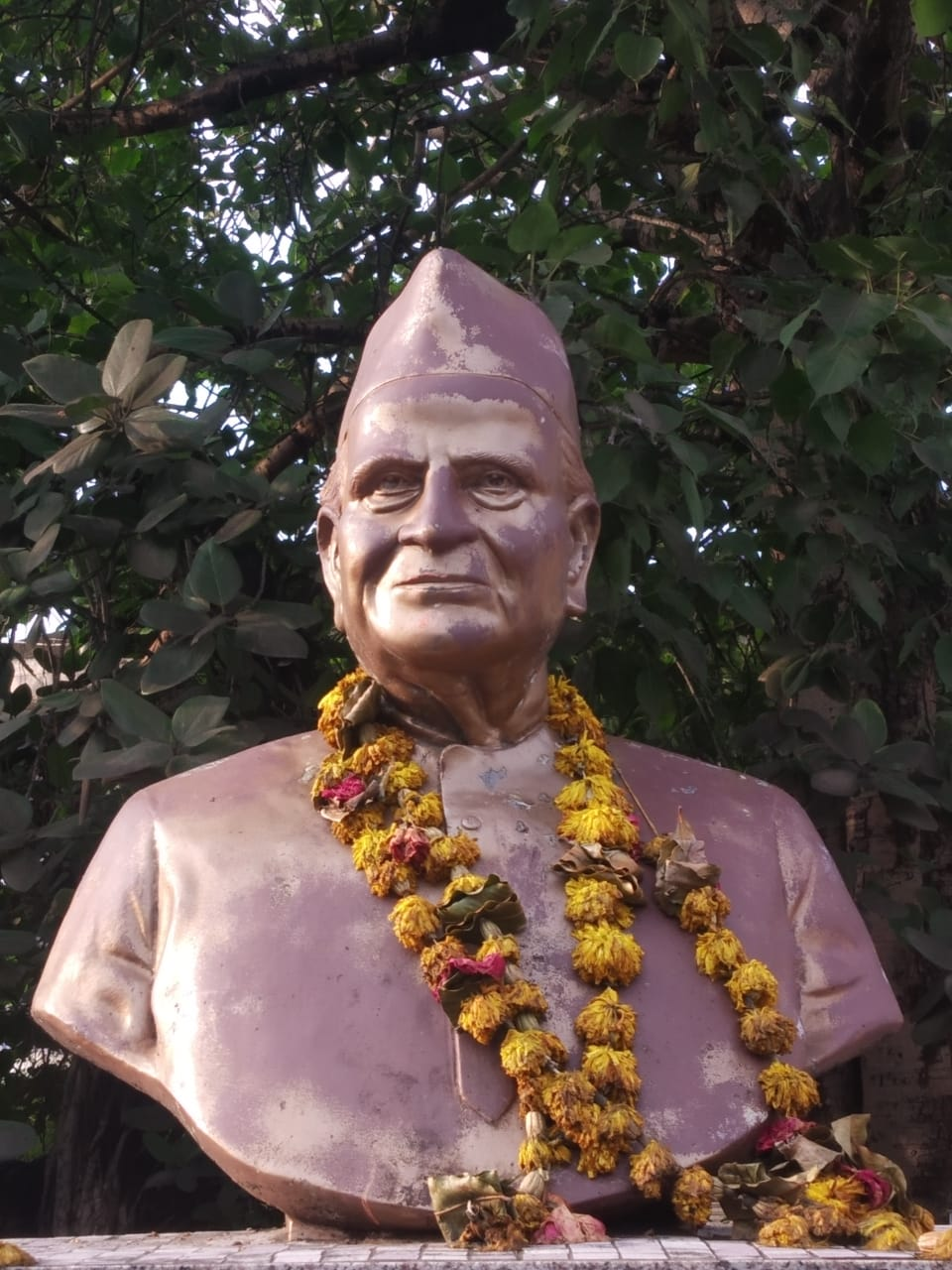
- Pruthvisinh Azad's bust at Bhavnagar
- Born: 15 September 1892; Village Lalru, Patiala district, Punjab, India
- Died: 5 March 1989 (aged 96); India
- Occupation: Indian independence activist
- Years active: 1907–1989
- Known for: Indian independence movement Lahore Conspiracy Trial
- Partner: Prabhavati Devi
- Children: 1
- Awards: Padma Bhushan

Prithvi Singh Azad (1892–1989) was an Indian independence activist, socialist revolutionary and one of the founder members of Ghadar Party. He suffered incarceration several times during the pre-independence period, including a term in the Cellular Jail. The Government of India awarded him the third highest civilian honour of the Padma Bhushan, in 1977, for his contributions to society.

== Early and personal life ==
Prithvi Singh Azad was born on 15 September 1892 at Lalru, a small town in Mohali district of the North Indian state of Punjab. He did a lot of work for the upliftment of Dalits. While still in his teens, he was married to Prabhavati Devi, a lady of his own community and similar social background, in a match arranged by their parents in the usual Indian way. The marriage was entirely harmonious in the traditional Indian mould and it lasted all their lives, through the tribulations of the freedom struggle, imprisonment and relative poverty. The couple had children, including a son, Ajit Singh Bhati, and a daughter, Dr. Pragya Kumar, who retired as chief medical officer at Panjab University, Chandigarh.

According to the historian Ramachandra Guha, who makes the assertion in his book "Rebels against the Raj," Mirabehn, daughter of a British admiral and one of Mahatma Gandhi's closest disciples, was enamoured of Prithvi Singh Azad and infatuated with him for many years; she even wrote him a number of letters expressing her feelings. However, she received absolutely no reciprocation from Azad, and finally she moved away. Guha refers to a number of respectable sources to make these assertions.

== Biography ==
Singh was attracted to the nationalist movement while he was still in his teens, and is reported to have been influenced by the arrest of Lokmanya Tilak and Khudi Ram Bose by the British government in 1907–08. He visited the United States in 1912, where he met Lala Har Dayal, one of the founders of later-day Ghadar Party, a militant organization formed by Indians in North America for the liberation of India. He also assisted in the establishment of Hindustan Ghadar, the mouthpiece of the party. Returning to India along with around 150 freedom fighters, he was captured by the British on 7 December 1914, tried, sentenced to 10 years imprisonment and spent time in various jails, including Calcutta, Madras and the Cellular Jail. After the initial futile attempt, he escaped by jumping out of a running train while he was being transferred from one jail to another. Later, he became an associate of Chandra Shekhar Azad and reportedly received a Mauser pistol from him. It was reported that Azad was with Chandra Shekhar Azad just before the British forces surrounded him at Alfred Park on 27 February 1931, but the latter asked Prithvi Singh to escape while deciding to continue his battle with the forces; alternatively another contention was that the two Azads met at Alfred Park a few days before the death of Chandra Shekhar.

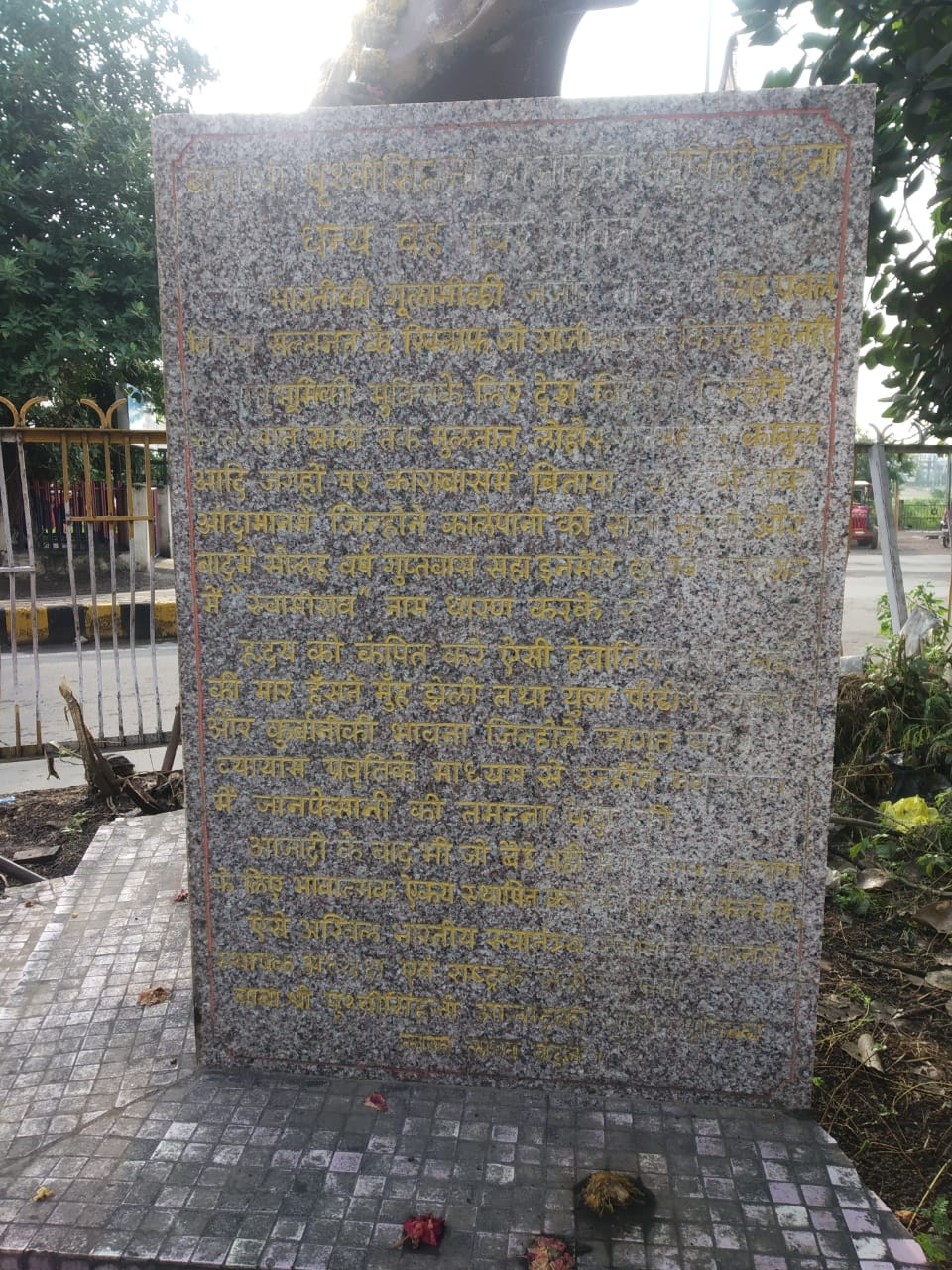
the plaque at Pruthvisinh Azad's bust at Bhavnagar

It was Chandra Shekhar who advised Azad to visit Russia for further training; it was reported that the idea to send Azad to Russia in fact came from Bhagat Singh, another martyred revolutionary and Chandra Sekhar was conveying Bhagat Singh's request. He visited Russia to spend a few months there and his experiences in Russia were later published as a book, Lenin ke Desham Me, which was subsequently translated into English by Vijay Chauhan under the title, Prithvi Singh Azad In Lenin's land. On his return to India, he met several mainstream freedom fighters, including Mohandas Gandhi and joined the nationalist movement led by Gandhi. Between 1933 and the Indian independence in 1947, he was arrested several times, including for the Lahore Conspiracy Case, in which he was sentenced to death; the sentence was later commuted to life imprisonment in the Cellular Jail. After the Indian independence, he successfully contested the elections to the first Constituent Assembly of India from Punjab and was its member since the assembly met for the first time at Constitution Club Hall, New Delhi on 9 December 1946. After India gained independence, he was selected as the Minister for Labor and Local Self-government, when Bhim Sen Sachar took over as the second Chief Minister of Punjab in 1949. The Government of India honored him with the civilian honor of Padma Bhushan in 1977. Azad was a track and field athlete later in his life, winning 4 gold medals in the M95 category at the 1987 World Masters Athletics Championships.

Azad died on 5 March 1989, at the age of 96. The story of his life has been documented in two autobiographies; Kranti Path ka Pathik (A Traveler in the Revolutionary Path), was published in 1990 by Haryana Sahitya Akademi while Baba Prithvi Singh Azad, the Legendary Crusader was published by Bharatiya Vidya Bhavan three years earlier in 1987. A set of documents related his life has been preserved in Nehru Memorial Museum and Library, New Delhi as Baba Prithvi Singh Azad Papers. A local Hospital in Lalru, his native place, is being considered for renaming as Baba Prithvi Singh Azad Memorial Hospital.

== See also ==
- Bhim Sen Sachar
- Chandra Shekhar Azad
- Constituent Assembly of India
- Ghadar Party
- Hindustan Ghadar
- Ghadar Mutiny
- Lala Har Dayal
- Lahore Conspiracy Case trial
