= Ram Chandra Bharadwaj =

President of the Ghadar Party between 1914 and 1917

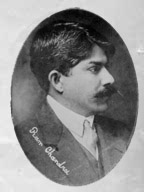
Ram Chandra Bharadwaj

Ram Chandra Bharadwaj, also known as Pandit Ram Chandra, was the president of the Ghadar Party between 1914 and 1917. As a member of the Ghadar Party, Ram Chandra was also one of the founding editors of the Hindustan Ghadar and a key leader of the party in its role in the Indo-German Conspiracy. He assumed the role of the president of the party following Lala Har Dayal's departure for Switzerland in 1914 and, along with Bhagwan Singh and Maulvi Mohammed Barkatullah, was key in rallying the support of the South Asian community in the Pacific Coast in the wake of the Komagata Maru incident for the planned February mutiny. Ram Chandra was assassinated on 24 April 1918 on the last day of the Hindu–German Conspiracy Trial by Ram Singh, a fellow defendant who believed that Ram Chandra was a British agent.
