= Sohan Singh Bhakna =

Sikh revolutionary (1870–1968)

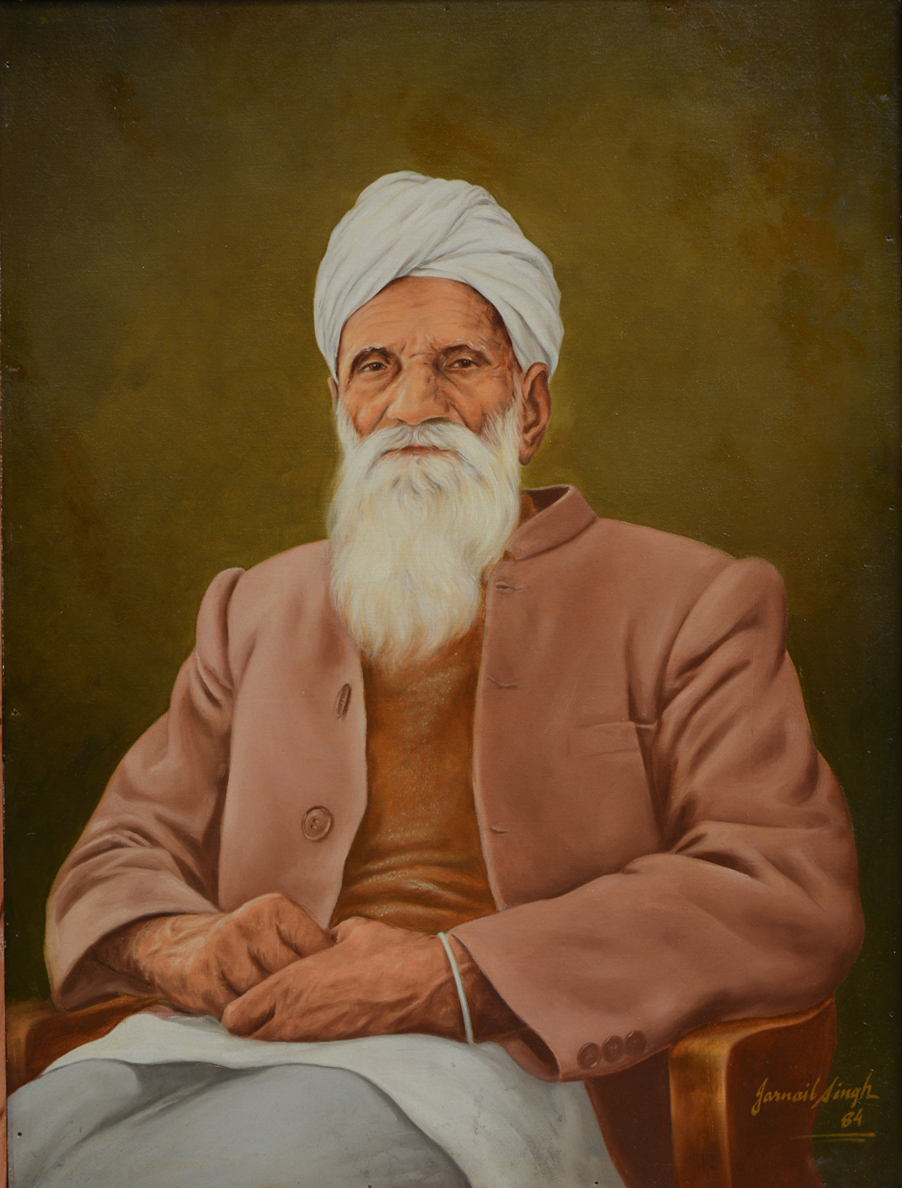
- Born: 4 January 1870; Khutrai Khurd, British India
- Died: 20 December 1968 (aged 98); Amritsar, India
- Organization(s): Ghadar Party, Babbar Akali Movement, Kisan Sabha
- Political party: Communist Party of India
- Movement: Indian independence movement, 1907 Punjab unrest, Ghadar Conspiracy, Communism in India

Signature
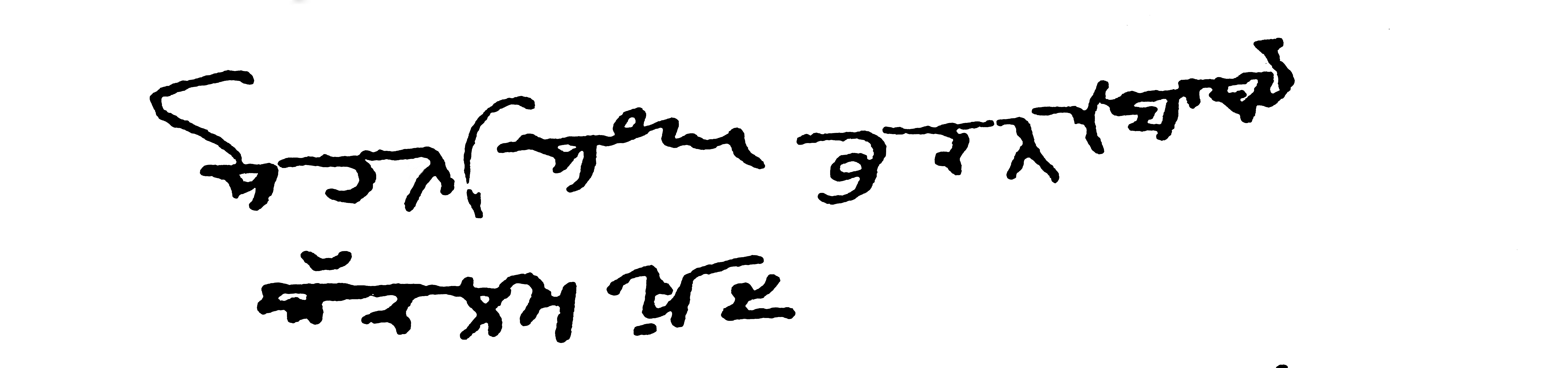

Baba Sohan Singh Bhakna (4 January 1870 – 20 December 1968) was an Indian revolutionary, the founding president of the Ghadar Party, and a leading member of the party involved in the Ghadar Conspiracy of 1915. Tried at the Lahore Conspiracy trial, Sohan Singh served sixteen years of a life sentence for his part in the conspiracy before he was released in 1930. He later worked closely with the Indian labour movement, devoting considerable time to the Kisan Sabha of the Communist Party of India.

== Early life ==
Sohan Singh was born on 4 January 1870 at the village of Khutrai Khurd, north of Amritsar, which was the ancestral home of his mother Ram Kaur. His father was Bhai Karam Singh, who lived with his family in the village of Bhakna, 16 km southwest of Amritsar. He was born into a sikh family. Young Sohan Singh spent his childhood at Bhakhna, where he received his childhood education in the village Gurudwara and by the Arya Samaj. He learnt to read and write in the Punjabi language at an early age, and was also instructed on the rudiments of Sikh traditions. Sohan Singh was married at the age of ten to Bishan Kaur, daughter of a landlord near Lahore by the name of Khushal Singh. Sohan Singh finished primary school at the age of sixteen in 1886, which he started at age eleven when primary school was first opened in his village, by which time he was also proficient in Urdu and Persian.

Sohan Singh became involved in the nationalist movement and the agrarian unrest that emerged in Punjab in the 1900s. He participated in the protests against the anti-Colonization Bill in 1906–07. Two years later, in February 1909, he left home to sail for the United States. After a two-month journey, Singh reached Seattle on 4 April 1909.

== United States ==
Sohan Singh soon found work as a labourer in a timber mill being constructed near the city. In this first decade of the 1900s, the Pacific coast of North America saw large scale Indian immigration. A large proportion of the immigrants were especially from Punjab British India which was facing an economic depression and agrarian unrest. The Canadian government met this influx with a series of legislations aimed at limiting the entry of South Asians into Canada, and restricting the political rights of those already in the country. The Punjabi community had hitherto been an important loyal force for the British Empire and the Commonwealth, and the community had expected, to honour its commitment, equal welcome and rights from the British and commonwealth governments as extended to British and white immigrants. These legislations fed growing discontent, protests and anti-colonial sentiments within the community. Faced with increasingly difficult situations, the community began organising itself into political groups. A large number of Punjabis also moved to the United States, but they encountered similar political and social problems. Early works among these groups date back to the time around 1908 when Indian students and Punjabi immigrants of the likes of P S Khankhoje, Pandit Kanshi Ram, Taraknath Das and Bhai Bhagwan Singh were working towards and for a political movement. Khankhoje himself founded the Indian Independence League in Portland, Oregon. Sohan Singh at this time came to be strongly associated with this political movement taking shape among Indian immigrants. His works also brought him close to other Indian nationalists in United States at the time.

Meanwhile, India House and nationalist activism of Indian students had begun declining in the East Coast towards 1910, but gradually shifted west to San Francisco. The arrival at this time of Har Dayal from Europe bridged the gap between the intellectual agitators in New York and the predominantly Punjabi labour workers and migrants in the west coast, and laid the foundations of the Ghadar movement. In the summer of 1913, representatives of Indians living in Canada and the United States met at Stockton, where the decision was taken to establish an organization, Hindustani Workers of the Pacific Coast. The Pacific Coast Hindustan Association, was formed in 1913 in the United States under the leadership of Har Dayal, P.S. Khankhoje and Sohan Singh Bhakna. Bhakna was its president. It drew members from Indian immigrants, largely from Punjab. Many of its members were also from the University of California at Berkeley including Dayal, Tarak Nath Das, Kartar Singh Sarabha and V.G. Pingle. The party quickly gained support from Indian expatriates, especially in the United States, Canada and Asia. Ghadar meetings were held in Los Angeles, Oxford, Vienna, Washington, D.C., and Shanghai.

== Ghadar Movement ==
The Ghadar Party evolved from the Pacific Coast Hindustan Association. The Ghadar's ultimate goal was to overthrow British colonial authority in India by means of an armed revolution. It viewed the Congress-led mainstream movement for dominion status modest and the latter's constitutional methods as soft. Ghadar's foremost strategy was to entice Indian soldiers to revolt. To that end, in November 1913 Ghadar established the Yugantar Ashram press in San Francisco. The press produced the Hindustan Ghadar newspaper and other nationalist literature. The Ghadar leadership, under Sohan Singh Bhakna, began at this time their first plans for mutiny. The inflammatory passions surrounding the Komagata Maru incident helped the Ghadarite cause, and Ghadar leaders including Sohan Singh, Barkatullah and Taraknath Das used it as a rallying point and successfully brought many disaffected Indians in North America into the party's fold. Sohan Singh himself had contacted the returning Komagata Maru at Yokohama and delivered to Baba Gurdit Singh a consignment of arms when he learnt of hostilities breaking out in July 1914. The war in Europe hastened Ghadar's plans. It was already in touch with Indian revolutionaries in Germany and with the German consulate in San Francisco. Ghadar also had party members in South-East Asia and had made contact with the Indian revolutionary underground. Elaborate plans were made to ship funds and arms from the United States and from South-East Asia, to India in what came to be called the Hindu German Conspiracy. These were to be used for a planned mutiny in India sometime in late 1914 or early 1915. The plans for the latter came to be known as the Ghadar Conspiracy. Sohan Singh, as one of the top of the Ghadar leadership, sailed to India in the SS Namsang at the outbreak of the war, in the wake of the Komagata Maru incidence to organise and direct the rebellion from India. However, British intelligence was already picking up traces of the revolutionary conspiracy. Returning to India, Singh was arrested in Calcutta on 13 October 1914 and sent to Ludhiana for interrogation. He was subsequently sent to the Central Jail in Multan and later tried in the Lahore Conspiracy Case and sentenced to death, with forfeiture of property. The death sentence was later commuted to life imprisonment in the Andamans, where he reached on 10 December 1915 and where he undertook several hunger strikes successively to secure the detainees better treatment.

== Later life ==
In 1921, Sohan Singh was transferred to Coimbatore jail and then to Yervada. Here however, Singh embarked on a hunger strike in protest against Sikh prisoners not being allowed to wear turbans and their Kacchera, amongst their religious obligations. In 1927, he was shifted to the Central Jail at Lahore, where he again went on hunger strike in June 1928 to protest against the segregation of the so-called low-caste Mazhabi Sikhs from other 'high-caste' Sikhs during meals. In 1929, while still interned, he went on a hunger strike in support of Bhagat Singh. He ultimately served sixteen years before he was released early in July 1930.

After his release, he continued working in the nationalist movement and labour politics. His works were identified closely with the works of the Communist party of India, devoting most of his time to organizing the Kisan Sabhas. He also made the release of interned Ghadarites a key part of his political work.

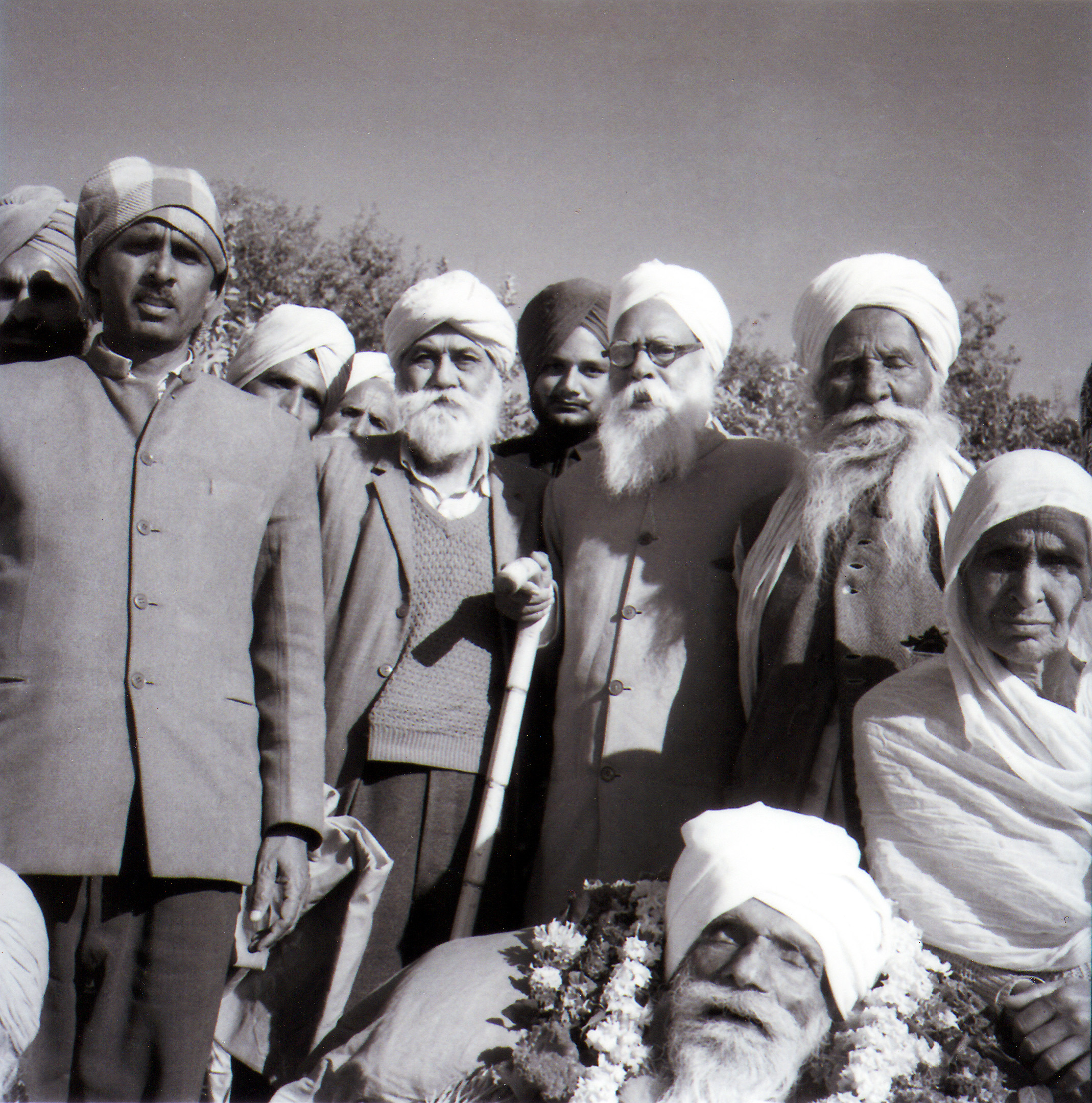
Funeral of Sohan Singh Bhakna, 21 December 1968. Photographed by Amarjit Chandan.

He was interned a second time during World War II, when he was jailed at the Deoli Camp in what is today Rajasthan. He remained incarcerated for nearly three years. After Independence he veered decisively towards the Communist Party of India. He was arrested on 31 March 1948, but released on 8 May 1948. However, he was seized again, but jail-going ended for him finally at the intervention of Independent India's first Prime Minister, Jawaharlal Nehru. Bent with age and ravaged by pneumonia, Baba Sohan Singh Bhakna died, at Amritsar, on 20 December 1968.
