= Ram Rakha =

Indian revolutionist (1884–1919)

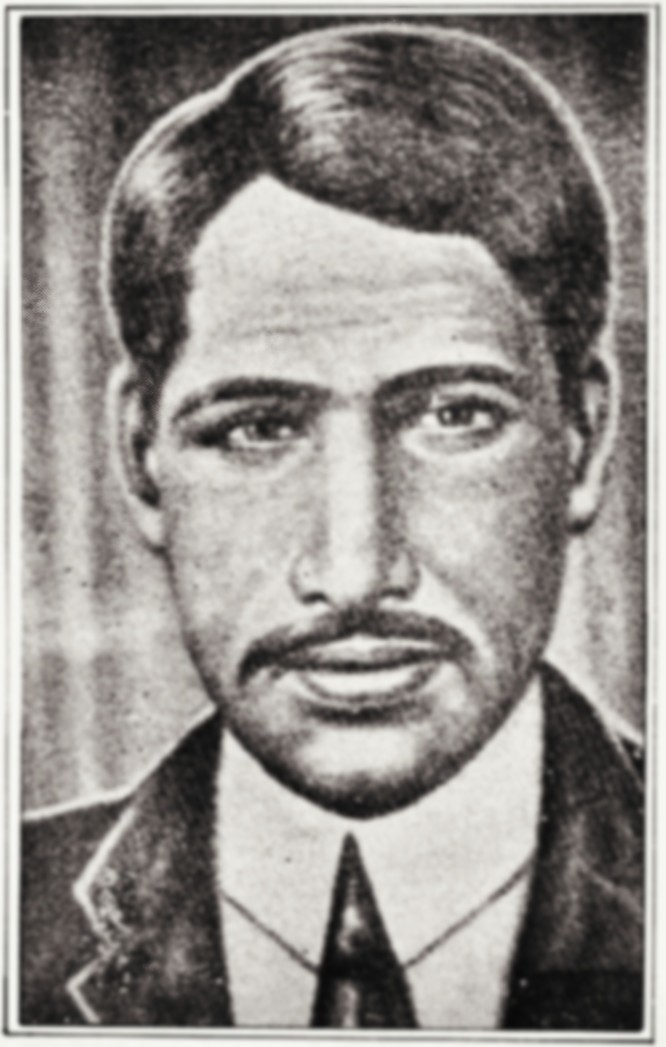
- Ram Rakha
- Born: 23 February 1884; Hoshiarpur
- Died: 22 December 1919 (aged 35); Cellular Jail, Andaman
- Other names: Pandit Ram Rakha Bali
- Occupation: Ghadr revolutionary
- Known for: Martyrdom In Cellular Jail

Pandit Ram Rakha (1884–1919) was an Indian revolutionary and a member of the Ghadr party from Punjab. Primarily known for his involvement in the Burma conspiracy case in Myanmar and also as a victim of inhumane torture in Cellular Jail.

== Revolutionary activities ==
He was the son of Jawahir Ram, and a resident of Hoshiarpur, Punjab. Worked in association with Sohanlal Pathak for creating a revolt among Indian soldiers of British army in Burma. Malaya and Singapore. Along with other three companions, Mujtaba Husain, Amar Singh, Ali Ahmed, they travelled to Burma and started to deliver the message of freedom movement of India in Burma. Ram Rakha engaged himself in collecting materials for the manufacture of bombs, which he had to secure from Bangkok where they were available. He was absent when the mutiny broke out but reached Singapore only a few days after the event. He believed that once the revolution had started the Germans would not be very late in coming to their aid. A resolution was taken in Rangoon to cause the uprising on Bakri Id day, 1915, which had to be abandoned at the last moment due to paucity of arms and ammunition. This was postponed to the Christmas and it never came to pass. Acting on information gathered in connection with the first Mandalay conspiracy case, the police arrested the four revolutionaries at different times not very distant from one another and started the Mandalay conspiracy case in 1917. The trial commenced on 28 March, in Mandalay and the accused were charged with the offence of waging war against the King, conspiracy, tampering with the allegiance of the army etc. Evidence covered many aspects of the Ghadr party in U.S.A, German collaboration in the rebellion, connection with the Indian revolutionaries and the individual responsibility of the accused persons. Judgement was delivered on 6 July 1917, and :- (1) Mujtaba Husain of Jaipur, (2) Amar Singh of Ludhiana, (3) Ali Ahmed Sadiq of Faizabad district, were condemned to death. (4) Ram Rakha was sentenced to transportation for life. All property belonging to the accused were confiscated to the state. The Lieutenant Governor in reviewing the case on appeal confirmed the judgment with modification regarding forfeiture of property. A Rangoon press Note issued on 7 December 1917, announced that the death sentence of each accused had been commuted to one of transportation for life by the Governor General in Council.

== Death ==
Ram Rakha was sent to the Andaman Cellular Jail to serve his sentence. He came into conflict with the prison authorities for not submitting to the humiliating conditions and resisting the inhuman treatment to which the prisoners were subjected. The prison authorities tried to take away his sacred thread. As he was a Hindu Brahmin, he protested against this. He was mercilessly assaulted for forcing him to submission. In protest, he resorted to hunger strike. Before he succumbed, he had been vomiting blood but nothing could be forced down his throat to make him live. He expired in 1919.
