= Yugantar Ashram =

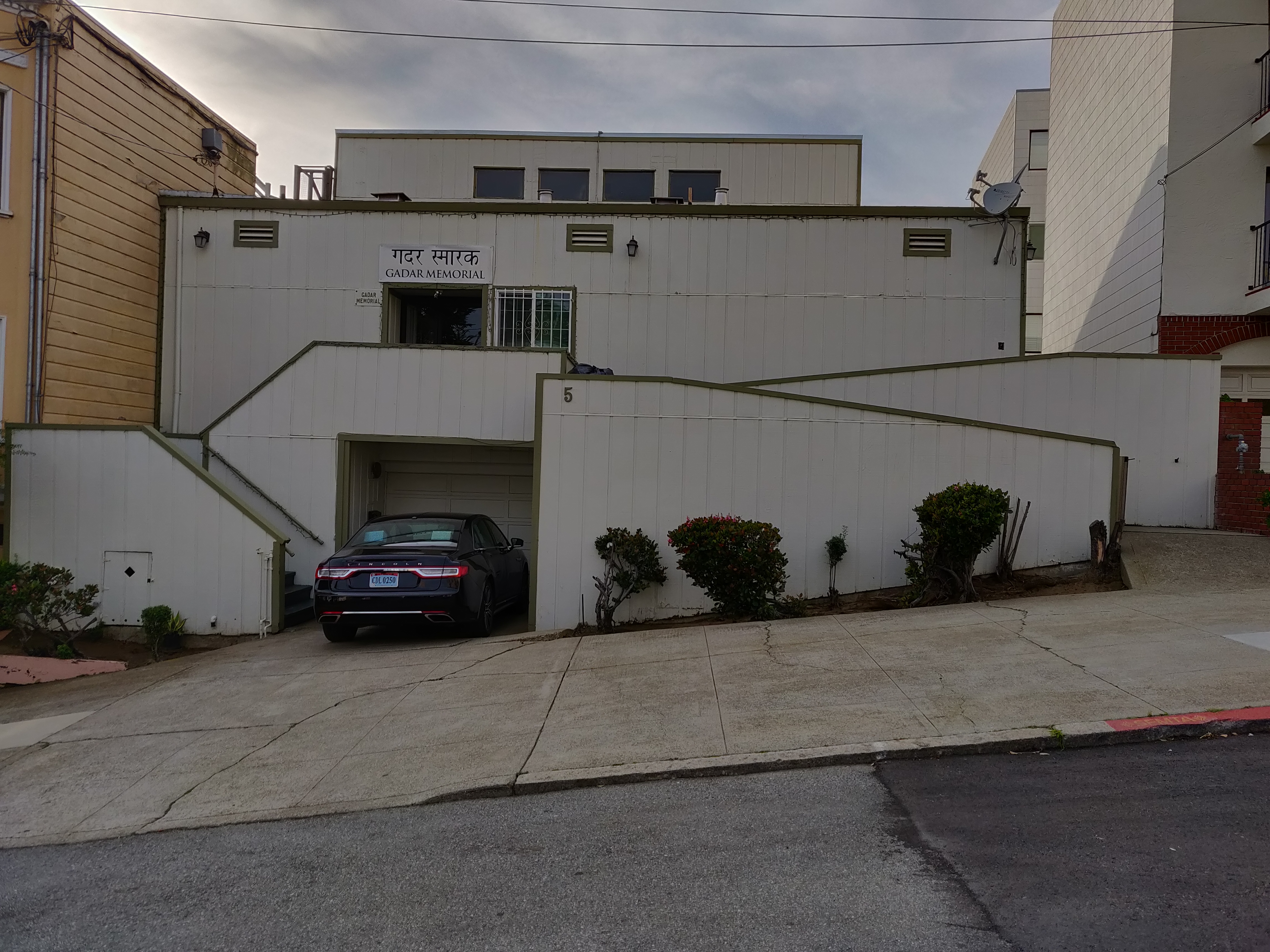
- Interactive map of the Yugantar Ashram area

General information
- Coordinates: 37°47′01″N 122°26′59″W

The Yugantar Ashram was the building in San Francisco, California, US that housed the headquarters of the Ghadar Party, the liberation movement of India during rule by Great Britain. First headquarters was at 436 Hill St, San Francisco, California. Ghadar Party operated from there from 1913 to 1917. It housed a printing press which published Ghadar, the party's newspaper. In 1917, headquarters of Ghadar Party were shifted to 5 Wood Street, San Francisco, which is the present site of Ghadar Memorial. The Ashram building with historical records was handed over to Government of India in 1949. On a move from the local community since 1952 to set up a memorial, the Government of India sanctioned US$83,000 for restoration of dilapidated building. Ground breaking for restoration work was done by Indian Minister of External Affairs, S. Swaran Singh in September 1974. Ghadar Memorial was inaugurated in 1975 by TN Kaul, Indian ambassador to US. A memorial establishing a historical museum and library has been built there.

There are 21 framed pictures of the Gadar Party leaders and martyrs on two opposite walls of the main hall. Twenty-two open bookshelves have an assortment of books and four showcases display some Ghadar Party material.

== Newspaper of Yugantar Ashram ==
The Yugantar Circular was a weekly newspaper started by Har Dayal, secretary of the Ghadar Party. The newspaper was later renamed Ghadar following a decision taken at a meeting at the Finnish Socialist Hall in Astoria, Oregon, which also resolved to establish the party's headquarters in San Francisco. Sohan Singh Bhakna served as president of the party.
