= Kirti =

Punjabi Marxist periodical

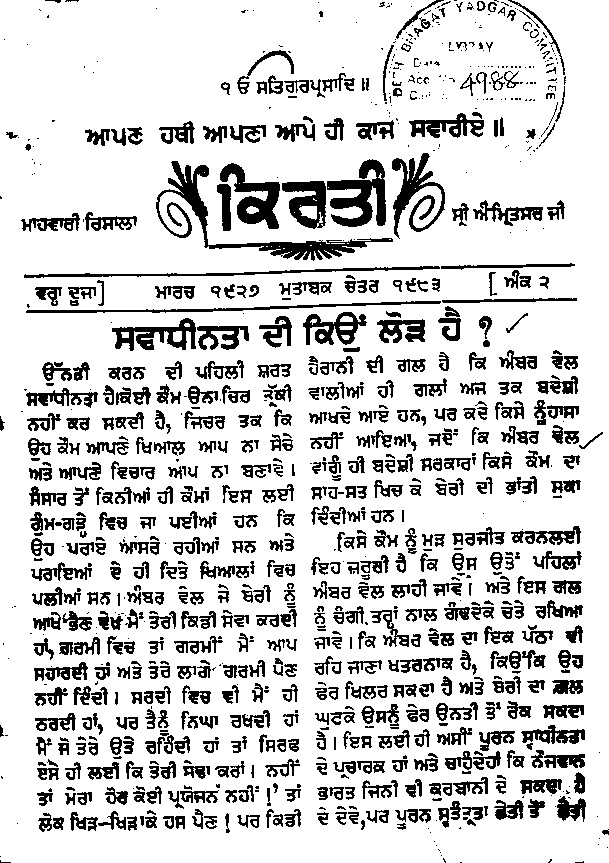
Front-page of the March 1927 issue

Kirti was a Punjabi monthly started by the veteran Ghadarite Santokh Singh in February 1926. It was the mouthpiece of the Kirti Kisan Sabha of Punjab. It was purely a communist production, subsidized by the Ghadar Party in the United States. Within a few months, Sohan Singh Josh took over as the editor. Its purpose was to outline the basic ideas of revolution and Marxist ideals.

== Etymology ==
According to Santokh Singh, the word Kirti is the exact translation of the word "labourer", a person who does not have any capital and means of production and earns his living by working for others. Similarly Kirti Shreni is the class of people who do not have any capital or means of production.

== History ==
The history of the monthly is tied to the Ghadarite and nascent communist movements of Punjab. When Rattan Singh was in the United States, he floated the idea of a periodical to be named Kirti to focus on the rights of workers and the oppressed. The periodical was founded in January 1926 by Sikh communist Santokh Singh, who served as its first editor. The early issues contained artwork to portrayed a communist message, such as a dead labourer on a funeral pyre or a worker, a martyred revolutionary with a garland of flowers, and farmer shaking hands to show class oppression and unity. The first issue contained an article by Santokh Singh criticizing Gandhi's Swadeshi movement. In September 1927, the journal informed its readers about an upcoming conference to be held in October 1927 at Hoshiarpur under Sohan Singh Josh and Bhag Singh Canadian.

Bhagat Singh was appointed to the editorial board of Kirti and worked as a deputy editor where he wrote several articles on revolution, communism, and dictatorship of the proletariat. He also used Kirti, the newspaper of the Kirti Kisan Party, to promulgate the Naujawan Bharat Sabha's message.
