= Jwala Singh Thatthian =

Ghadarite leader

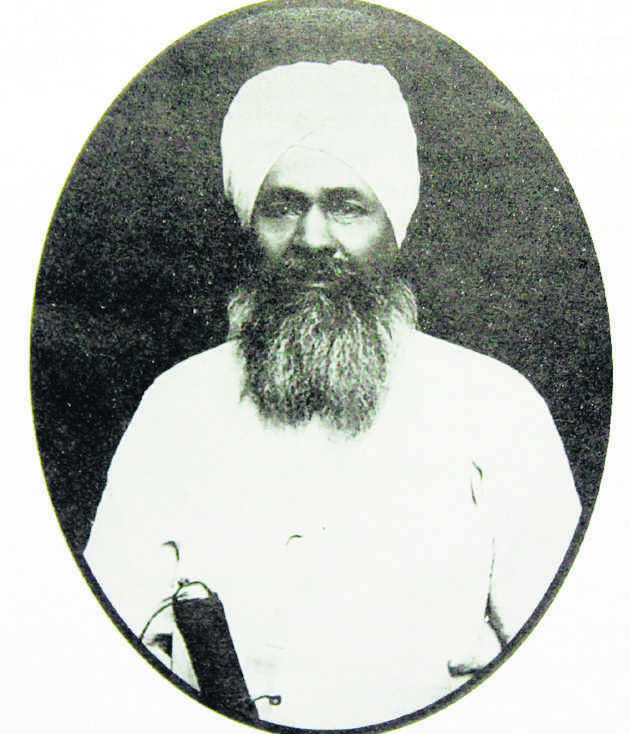
Portrait of Jawala Singh Thatthian

Jwala Singh Thatthian (1866 – 8 May 1938), known by the alias Santa Singh and nickname Potato King, was a leader of the Ghadar movement and the founder of the first gurdwara in the United States in Stockton, California. A wealthy potato farmer in California, he raised funds for a scholarship for Indian students in the United States.

== Biography ==
He was the son of Kanhaya Singh, a small-scale farmer, of Thattian village in Amritsar district, Punjab. In 1905, he left his village and in 1908, he immigrated to San Francisco in the United States via a journey through Panama and Mexico. Eventually he came to own a large farm but became disillusioned due to the anti-Sikh hate he experienced. Jawala Singh, a successful potato farmer in the San Joaquin Valley, leased a 500-acre ranch with business partner Wasakha Singh in Holtville, next to Stockton. Immigrating Punjabi Sikh farmers would perform prayers in a room on the farm with the Guru Granth Sahib. Jawala and Wasakha would eventually found the gurdwara on South Grant Street in a house, but their ranch would become an important religious, social, and political center associated with the gurdwara. Jawala Singh served as the gurdwara's granthi. He started a scholarship program in 1912 for male and female Sikh students in the United States at the University of California. Berkeley known as the Guru Gobind Singh Scholarship. In 1912, the awardees of the scholarship included one Christian, one Sikh, one Muslim, and three Hindus. The scholars were also supported by lodging available at 1731 Allston Way, Berkeley known as the Guru Nanak Dev Vidyarthi Ashram.

Jawala went on to form the Ghadar Party, a revolutionary movement that called for diaspora Indians to end the British occupation of India. He would serve as the vice-president of the Ghadar Party. The Stockton gurdwara served as a key place for the Ghadarites. During World War I, Jawala recruited Sikhs to fight against the British colonial administration in Punjab while returning to the subcontinent aboard a boat and stopping at port-cities along the way. When he arrived in Calcutta on the boat Tosha Mans on 29 October 1914, he was arrested for his revolutionary activities. He was tried in Ludhiana and sentenced to fourteen years of jail, which was served at Montgomery Jail. In 1928, the Kriti Kisan Lehar (movement) emerged from the Ghadar movement. In 1933, Jawala was released from jail after serving his sentence, with him beginning to work for the Desh Bhagat Pariwar Sahaik Committee. Jawala was the first president of the Punjab Kisan Sabha and led the peasant movement of the Nili Bar. In 1935 he was arrested again and sentenced to a year in jail. After release in 1938, he was involved in a bus accident while travelling to the All-India Kisan Conference and died on 8 May 1938.
