= Gulab Kaur =

Indian freedom fighter

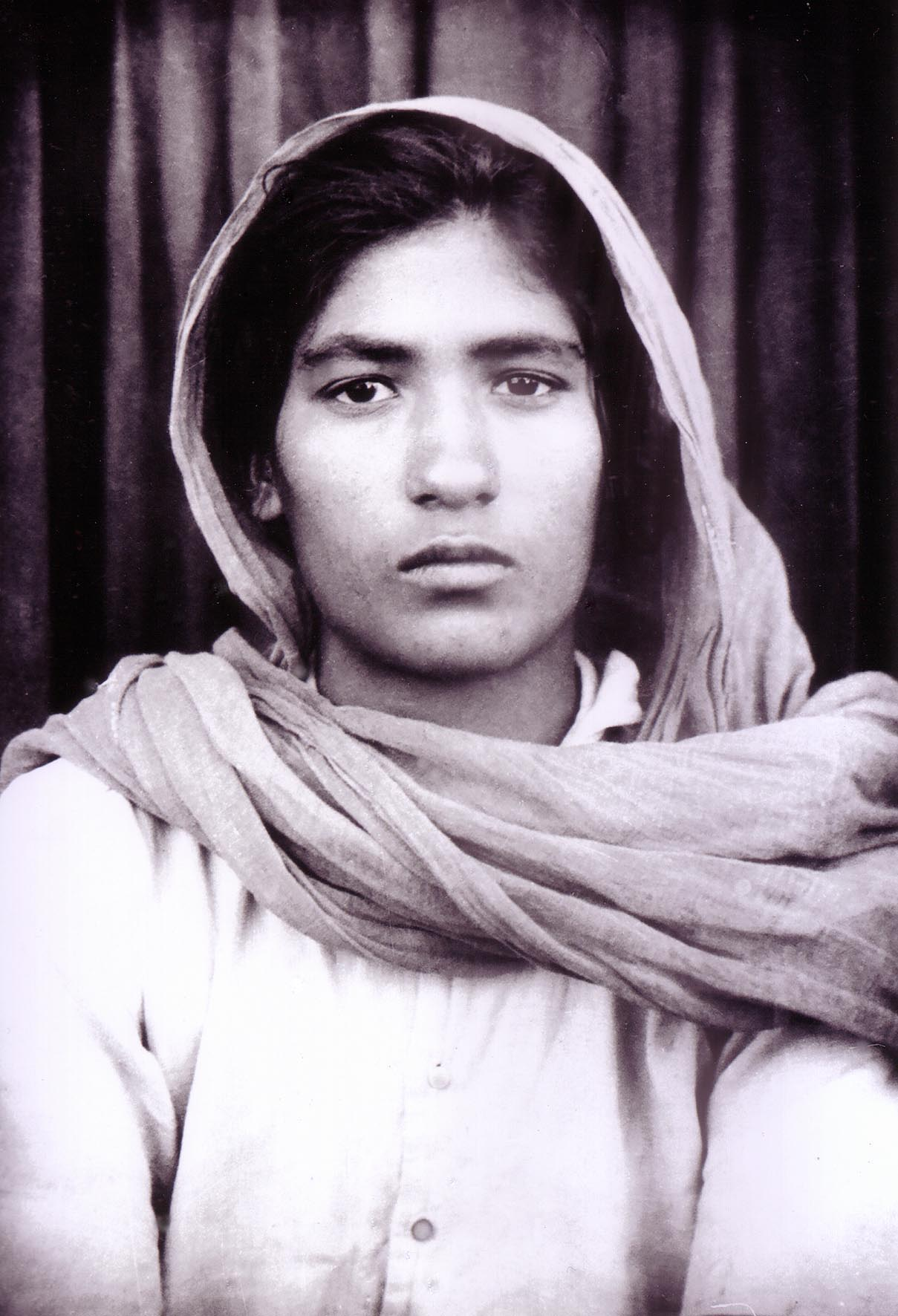
- Gulab Kaur
- Born: Gulab Kaur c. 1890; Bakshiwala, Sangrur district, Punjab, British India
- Died: 1941
- Occupation: Indian freedom fighter
- Movement: Ghadar Movement

Gulab Kaur was an Indian freedom fighter. She was born around 1890 and died in 1925.

== Early life ==
Born circa 1890 in the village Bakshiwala in Sangrur district of Punjab, India, Gulab Kaur was married to Mann Singh. The couple went to Manila, Philippines, intending to migrate to America ultimately.

== Political career ==
In Manila, Gulab Kaur joined the Ghadar Movement, founded by Indian immigrants with the aim to liberate the Indian Subcontinent from British Rule.

Gulab Kaur kept vigil on party printing press in guise. Posing as a journalist with a press pass in hand, she distributed arms to the Ghadar Movement members. Gulab Kaur also encouraged others to join the Ghadar Movement by distributing independence literature and delivering inspiring speeches to Indian passengers of ships.

Gulab Kaur with about fifty other freedom Ghadrites of the Philippines joined the S.S. Korea batch and sailed for India, changing at Singapore from S.S. Korea to Tosha Maru. After reaching India, she with some other revolutionaries were active in the villages of Kapurthala, Hoshiarpur and Jalandhar to mobilize the masses for armed revolution for the cause of the independence of the country. She was sentenced to two years in prison in Lahore, then in British-India and now in Pakistan, for seditious acts.

There is a book available about Gulab Kaur titled Gadar Di Dhee Gulaab Kaur in Punjabi written by Kesar Singh published in 2014.
