= Gurdwara Sahib of Stockton =

Place of worship

Gurdwara Sahib Stockton
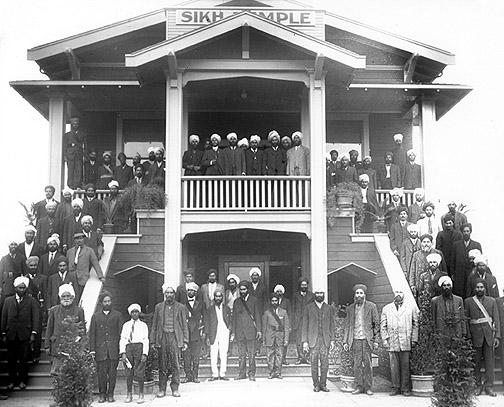

Religion
- Affiliation: Sikhism

Location
- Location: 1930 S Sikh Temple St, Stockton, CA 95206
- Interactive map of Gurdwara Sahib Stockton
- Coordinates: 37°56′03″N 121°16′29″W

Architecture
- Established: October 24, 1912

Website
- http://stocktongurdwara.org/

Gurdwara Sahib Stockton is a gurdwara located in the city of Stockton, California. It is notable for being the first Sikh house of worship in the United States.

The Pacific Coast Khalsa Diwan Society founded the gurdwara in 1912.

== History ==
Jawala Singh, a successful potato farmer in the San Joaquin Valley, leased a 500-acre ranch with business partner Wasakha Singh in Holtville, next to Stockton. Immigrating Punjabi Sikh farmers would perform prayers in a room on the farm with the Guru Granth Sahib. Jawala and Wasakha would eventually found the gurdwara on South Grant Street in a house, but their ranch would become an important religious, social, and political center associated with the gurdwara.

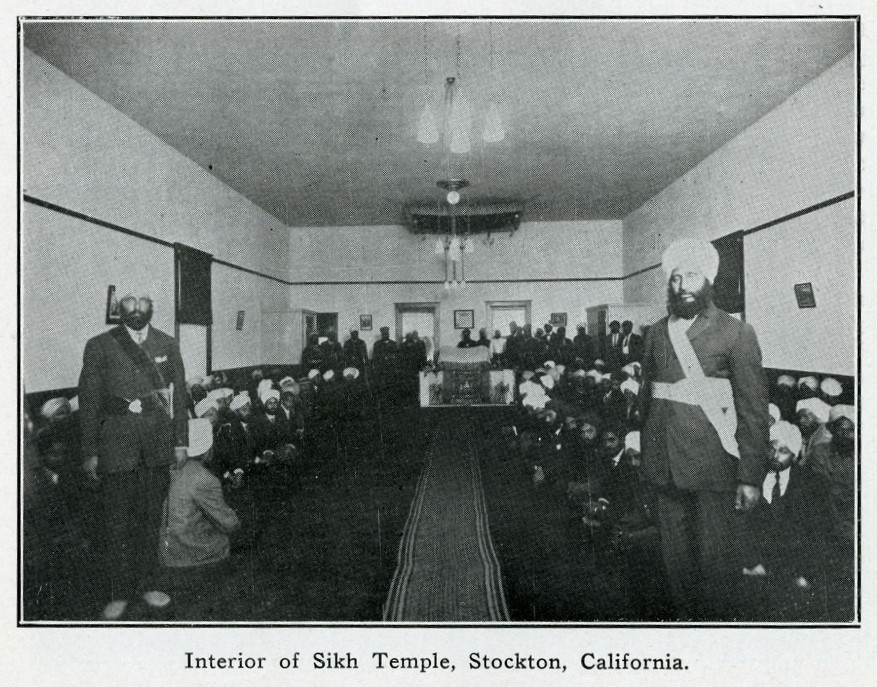
Interior in 1916

Jawala went on to form the Ghadar Party, a revolutionary movement that called for diaspora Indians to end the British occupation of India. The Stockton Gurdwara would serve as an important benefactor of the Ghadar Party, sponsoring the first Punjabi language newspaper in the United States, The Ghadar, among other support.

== Notable people ==
Dalip Singh Saund, Democrat CA-29, the first Sikh American, the first Asian American, the first Indian American and the first member of a non-Abrahamic faith to be elected to Congress. His studies at University of California, Berkeley, were sponsored by the Stockton Gurdwara.

== Gallery ==
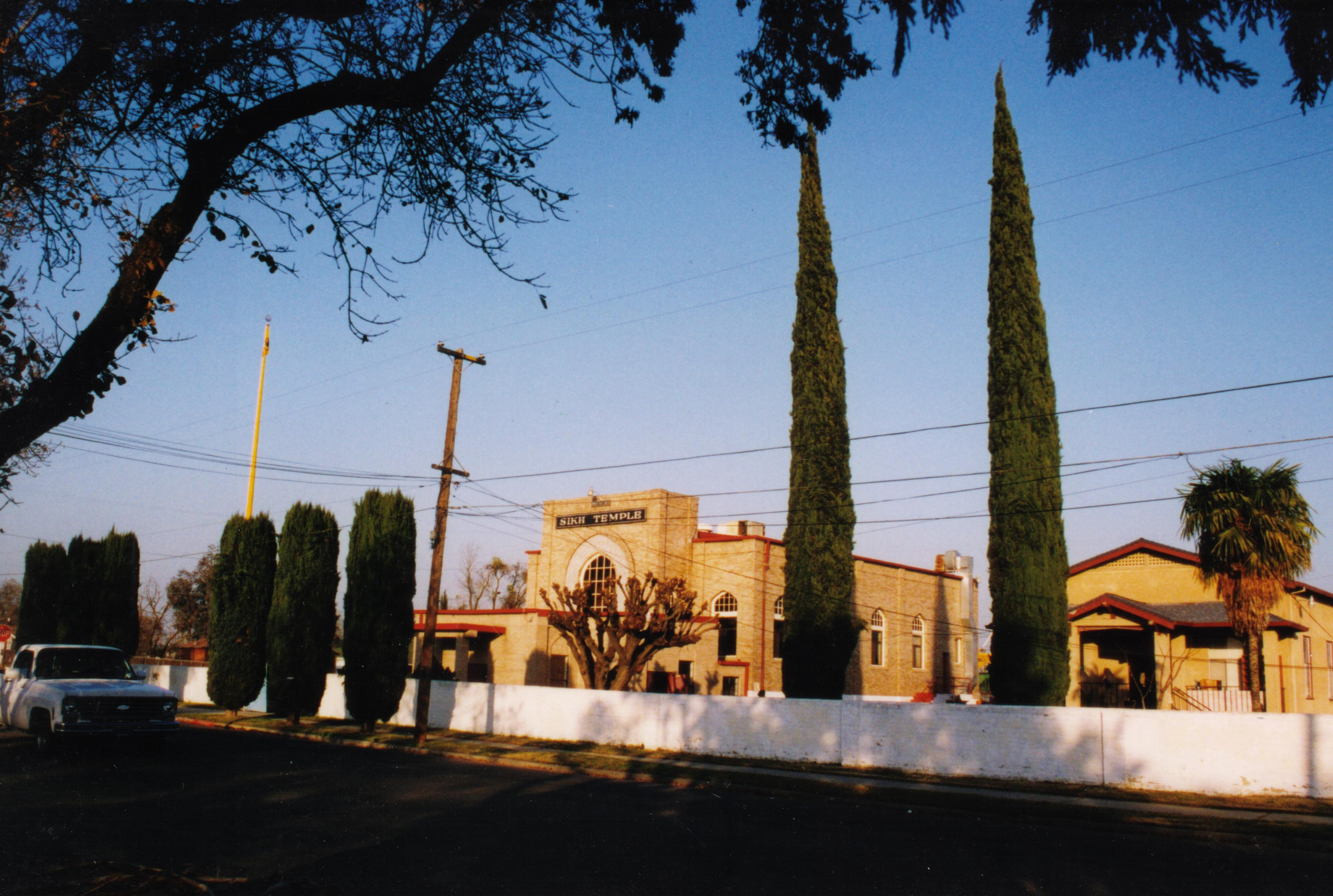
First Sikh temple in the United States, built in Stockton in 1912 (photo taken in 1997)

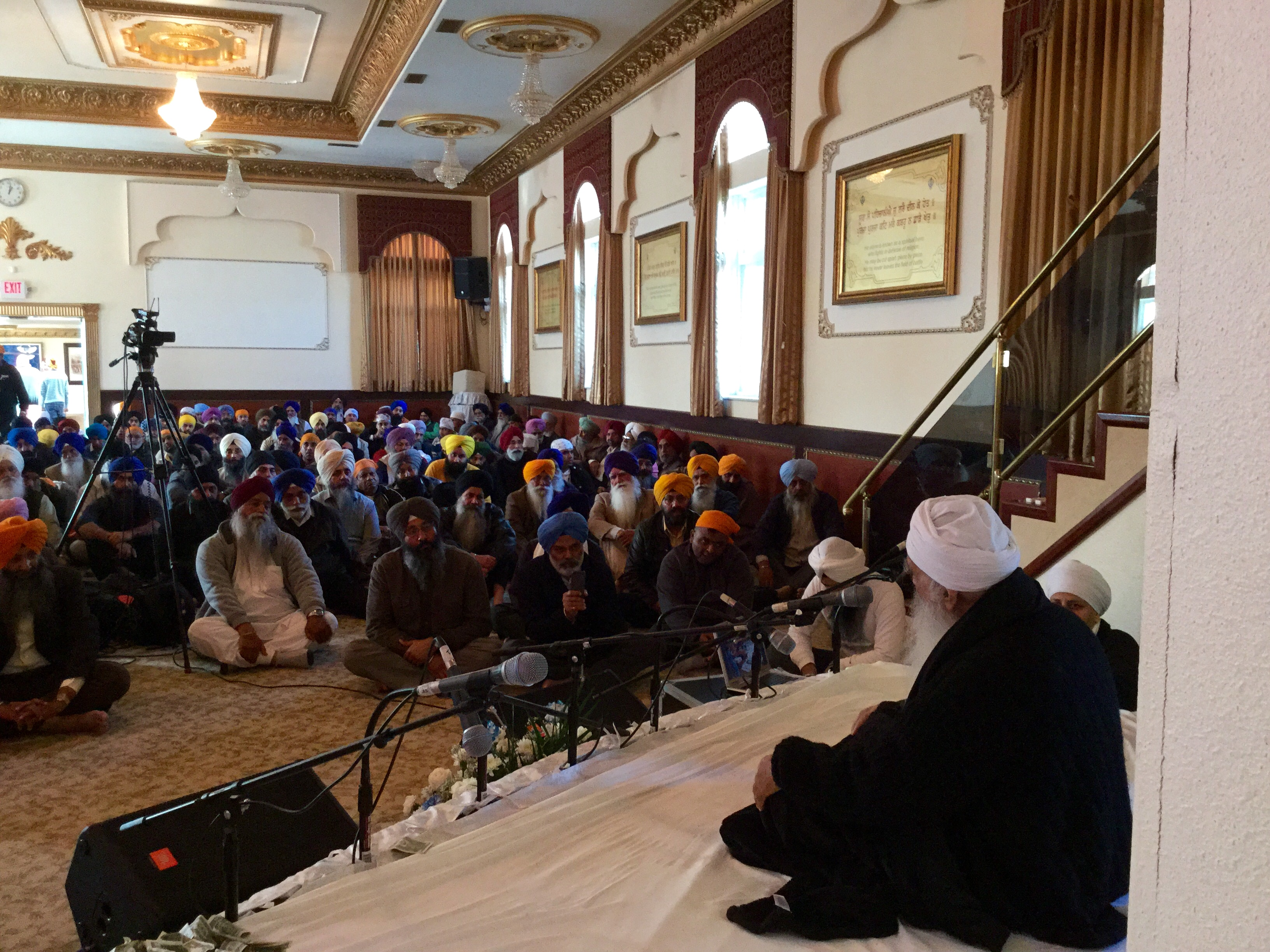
A 2015 address at the gurdwara

== See also ==
- Sikhism in the United States
