= Gaddar (disambiguation) =

Gaddar was an Indian poet, singer, and communist revolutionary.

Gaddar may also refer to:

- Gaddar (TV series), 2024 Turkish drama series
- Gaddar railway station, in Karachi, Pakistan
- Gaddar: The Traitor, 2015 Indian film

== See also ==
- Gadar (disambiguation)
