= Pandurang Sadashiv Khankhoje =

Indian scientist & statesmen (1884–1967)

- P S Khankhoje
- Born: 7 November 1883; Wardha, Maharashtra
- Died: 22 January 1967 (aged 83); Nagpur, Maharashtra
- Organization(s): Ghadar Party, Berlin Committee, Communist Party of India
- Movement: Hindu–German Conspiracy, Indian Communism

Pandurang Sadashiv Khankhoje (7 November 1884 – 22 January 1967) was an Indian revolutionary, scholar, agricultural scientist and Statesman who was among the founding fathers of the Ghadar Party.

== Early life ==
Khankhoje was born in November 1884 to a Marathi Deshastha Rigvedi Brahmin (DRB) family at Wardha, where his father worked as a petition-writer. Young Khankhoje spent his childhood in Wardha, where he completed his primary and middle school education before moving to Nagpur for higher education. He was at the time inspired by the nationalist work of Bal Gangadhar Tilak. At some time in the first decade of the 1900s, Khankhoje left India on a voyage that ultimately saw him settle in the United States. Here he enrolled in the Washington State College (now called Washington State University), graduating in 1913.

== Indian independence activities ==
Khankhoje's earliest nationalist work abroad dates back to the time around 1908 when he, along with Pandit Kanshi Ram founded the Indian Independence League in Portland, Oregon. His works also brought him close to other Indian nationalists in United States at the time, including Tarak Nath Das. In the years preceding World War I, Khankhoje was one of the founding members of the Pacific coast Hindustan association, and subsequently founded the Ghadar Party. He was at the time one of the most influential members of the party. He met Lala Har Dayal in 1911. He also enrolled at one point in a West Coast military academy.

=== Activities during World War I ===
Through World War I, Khankhoje was intricately involved in the Hindu–German Conspiracy when he was involved in the plans for the mutiny. He visited Europe during the war and subsequently went to Mesopotamia along with other members of what was the Berlin Committee. In the summer of 1915, he worked clandestinely among troops of the Indian expeditionary force, spreading nationalist literature and hoping to incite a mutiny. Through the course of the war, Khankhoje made his way through Turkey and Persia under different Muslim guises as far as Baluchistan, spreading Ghadarite propaganda en route. He is known to have attempted insurrections and raised at the Iran-Baluchistan border while Mahendra Pratap's Indo-German expedition attempted to rally the Afghan Emir Habibullah Khan against British India. Towards the end of the war, Khankhoje, like most of the members of the Berlin committee, began turning towards communism. He is known to have been in Soviet Union in company of the earliest Indian communist, including Virendranath Chattopadhyaya, M. P. T. Acharya, M. N. Roy, Abdur Rab Barq.For his nationalist work at the time, Khankhoje was banned from returning to India as a highly dangerous individual.

== Academic career ==
Khankhoje later moved to Mexico in the 1920s, where he was the professor of Botany and Crop Breeding in the National School of Agriculture of Mexico. In 1936, Khankhoje married Jean Alexandrine Sindic, a Belgian woman in Mexico by whom he had two daughters. He led the Mexican corn breeding programme and was appointed director to the Mexican Government's department of Agriculture.

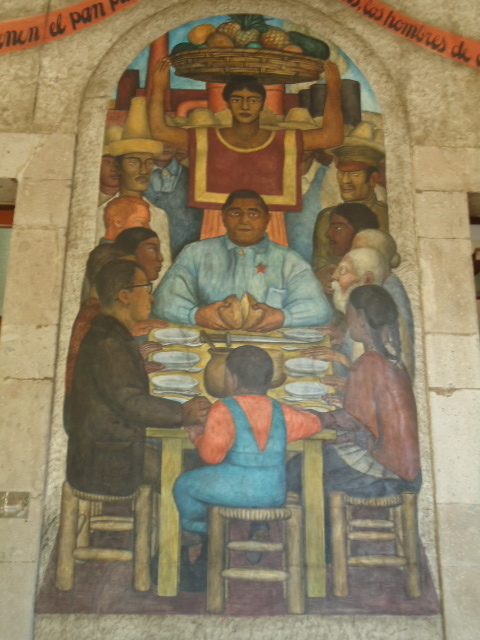
Our Bread (1938), mural by Diego Rivera with Khankhoje seated at the centre, located at the Mexican Secretariat of Public Education.

Khankhoje features on a mural at Secretariat of Public Education (Mexico) painted by Diego Rivera, which is almost reminiscent of the Last Supper. He heads a table and breaks the bread with a big knife. A farmer and a soldier stand on the either side with people from different nations sitting around the table. Mexico is represented by the child wearing overalls.

== Return to India and later years ==
Both Khankhoje and Jean returned to India after 1947. His application for visa was initially rejected by the Indian government due to the ban by the British Indian Government, but was eventually overturned. He settled in Nagpur and subsequently embarked on a political career. Pandurang Khankhoje died on 22 January 1967.

== Legacy ==
In August 2022, Speaker of the Lok Sabha Om Birla unveiled Khankhoje's statue during his visit to Mexico.
