= Gaddaar =

Gaddaar may refer to:

- Gaddaar (1973 film), an Indian Hindi-language film
- Gaddaar (1995 film), an Indian Hindi-language film

== See also ==
- Gadar (disambiguation)
- Ghadar (disambiguation)
