= Kirti Kisan Sabha =

Communist party of British Punjab

The Kirti Kisan Sabha was a communist and socialist party in the Punjab, British India that advocated for the rights of workers and farmers. The movement was known as the Kirti Kisan Lehar. The party was founded by Sohan Singh Josh in 1928. The mouthpiece of the party was the Kirti periodical. It was the most prevalent communist organisation in British Punjab and the only Indian Communist organisation to be in communication with the Comintern aside from the Communist Party of India (CPI).

== Etymology ==
The name of the party derived from the words kirtī meaning "worker", kīsān meaning "peasant", and sabhā meaning "society" or "party".

== History ==
=== Background ===
Har Dayal, one of the founders of the Ghadar Party, had indulged in the works of Karl Marx and befriended German communists. The success of the Russian Revolution in 1917 motivated leftists in India that socialism could be realized. The Kirti Kisan in Punjab derived from the Ghadar movement in 1918, which had split into the Punjabi Kirti Kisan, which had communist and socialist leanings and later aligned with Congress, and the Babbar Akali faction, which was Sikhism-centric. After the Lahore Conspiracy Trials of 1915 and the Hindu-German Conspiracy Trial of 1917, many Ghadarites in North America returned to India, which would lead to the arise of the Punjabi left during the 1920s. Many of these Ghadarites had formed connections with leftist organisations abroad and were influenced by them, such as the Industrial Workers of the World. Santokh Singh, who had been arrested for his role in the Hindu-German Conspriacy, formed a friendship with an American Communist while imprisoned on McNeil Island for twenty-one months, who shared the ideology with Santokh. Thus, Santokh urges his peers to learn about Communism after his release after being inspired by the ideology.

In 1920, Soviet leader Lenin at the Third International (Comintern) and the Second Comintern Congress and Grigory Zinoviev at the Congress of the People of the East called for the destruction of British colonial power in the eastern colonies, including in India. In 1922 at the Fourth Comintern Congress, the Theses on the Eastern Question was adopted which praised Sikh militancy in Punjab. Indian communist leader M. N. Roy believed Punjab to be an ideal region for revolution to take root by utilizing Punjabis in the British Indian Army. In the early 1920s, the Ghadarites began communicating more frequently with Russian revolutionaries, with them sending two representatives, Santokh Singh Dhardiao and Rattan Singh Dabba, to the Fourth Communist International Congress in November 1922. When they returned, they affirmed the need to spread Communism amongst the Akali jathas, with Rattan Singh serving as the mediator between the jathas and the Third International. In 1923, Ghadarites from Kabul in Afghanistan, alongside Gurmukh Singh and Udham Singh, attempted to persuade the Shiromani Gurdwara Parbandhak Committee to form a Sikh reformist Sanjhiwal (unified) Association recognized by the Comintern Congress in Russia. Five Ghadarite were dispatched to Russia to be trained in Communism at the University for the Toilers of the East. Santokh Singh spent two years in Moscow, Russia learning Soviet methods of village propaganda. Santokh Singh, while returning to India from Russia, had been arrested and sentenced to house-arrest between 1924–1926, a time he used to plan a Communist uprising in Punjab based upon the local characteristics of the region. Santokh Singh decided that a propaganda outlet was needed to spur the masses.

==== Establishment of the Kirti periodical ====
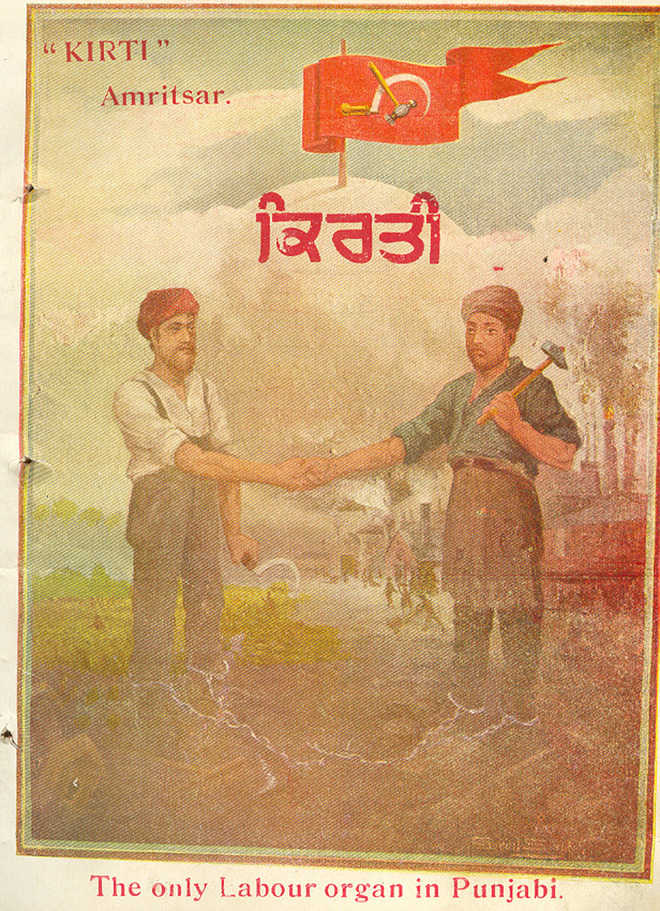
Front-page of an issue of the Kirti, Amritsar, 1928 depicting a farmer and labourer shaking hands and symbolizing the political unity of Communism and Sikhism

After Santokh Singh was released from house-arrest, he moved to Amritsar with Bhag Singh Canadian and Karam Singh Cheema in early 1926, where he founded the Kirti ('Worker') periodical in early 1926 at Amritsar, which covered peasant and labor issues within Punjab and overseas. The Kirti was rapidly successful due to its effectiveness with combining Sikhism with Communist revolutionary ideals. In his articles in the periodical, Santokh Singh attempted to unite both the Punjabi and international peasantry and labourers under the Kirti label, guided by Sikh principles, to advanced his regional Marxist agenda. However, Santokh Singh died of tubercolisis on 19 May 1927 and Sohan Singh Josh had earlier in 21 January 1927 took-on the role of managing the Kirti as its editor. Josh was more Marxist-aligned and moved away from Sikh influences, believing the contemporary Sikh political movements and organisations in Punjab to be dogmatic and exclusionary. Instead of quoting Sikh scripture like Santokh Singh had done, Josh instead quoted from the Communist Manifesto of Karl Marx. Josh claimed that the Kirti became more popular with Hindu and Muslim peasants of Punjab after he expunged Sikh influences from the periodical. This led to a political divide between the secular and non-secular in the Punjab during the late 1920s amongst its leftist movement. The Kirti became the organ of the Punjab Kirti Kisan Party and managed by Sohan Singh Josh.

=== Establishment of the Kirti Kisan Sabha ===
With the support of the Indian Congress and some Akali Dal members, the first Kirti-Kisan (Worker-Peasant) Conference was held by Sohan Singh Josh in Hoshiarpur, Punjab on 6–7 October 1927. The conference found support with the League Against Imperialism. On 12 April 1928 at 6:00 p.m., the Kirti-Kisan Sabha of Punjab was founded by Sohan Singh Josh at Jallianwala Bagh in Amritsar with sixty persons present to unite the region's peasant, labor, prisoner, and anti-imperialist movements and struggles. According to the party, a kirti was one who "performed his work with his own hands and did not exploit others".

On 30 September 1928, a second Kirti-Kisan (Worker-Peasant) Conference was held in Lyallpur that focused on the issues of beggar (forced labor), worker pay, the lack of irrigation water, and the reduction in taxes and land revenue. The second conference called for the complete independence of India and rejected the Nehru Commission. Chabil Das, a Lahore propagandist of the Naujawan Bharat Sabha, presided over the second conference. A third conference was held the same year at Meerut on 13 October 1928 where many of its members were arrested as part of the Meerut Communist conspiracy case. At Lahore in 1928, the party publicly opposed the Simon Commission. In Christmas week of 1929, the annual session of the party was held in Lahore. Another conference was held in Anandpur Sahib on the occasion of Hola Mohalla on 4 March 1931, which pushed for the localization of the party in the villages of Punjab. The annual session of the party on 29 March 1931 at Karachi involved the Naujawan Bharat Sabha.

=== Dissolution ===
The party was outlawed on 10 September 1934 by the Criminal Law Amendment Act, 1908, vide notification No. 12467SB. Initially, the Punjabi Kirti Kisan Party was larger and better funded than the Community Party of Punjab. During World War II, it supported Russia. In 1942, the remnants of the Punjabi Kirti Kisan Party was absorbed by the Communist Party of Punjab. In the 20th century, an increasing divide occurred between the leftist and Sikh movements of Punjab.

== Ideology and aims ==
The party advocated for the abolition of the Nazrana, seizing land from landlords to be given to cultivators, nationalizing production, increased wages and hourly caps for shifts, the bestowal of government loans and technological assistance for cultivators, the democratization of village panchayats with peasant inclusion, a Bolshevik state, and the reducation of taxes, water costs, and land-revenue.

== Relations with other movements ==
The Kirti Kisan supported other contemporary movements, such as the Gurdwara Reform (such as the Guru-ka-Bagh and Jaito morchas), and the Babbar Akali movements. It also recognized the martyrs of the Budge-Budge riots of the Komagata Maru incident and the Jallianwala Bagh masscare.

== See also ==
- Workers and Peasants Party (India)
- All India Kisan Sabha
- Communist Ghadar Party of India
- Communism in India
- Naxalite–Maoist insurgency
