= Gadar =

Gadar or Gaddar may refer to:

- Gadar River, in Iran
- Gadar: Ek Prem Katha, a 2001 Indian romantic drama film
  - Gadar 2: The Katha Continues, a 2023 Indian film, its sequel

== See also ==
- Gaddar (disambiguation)
- Ghadar (disambiguation)
- Gaddaar (disambiguation)
