= Ghadar movement =

Indian activists movement (1913–1948)

Ghadar Party
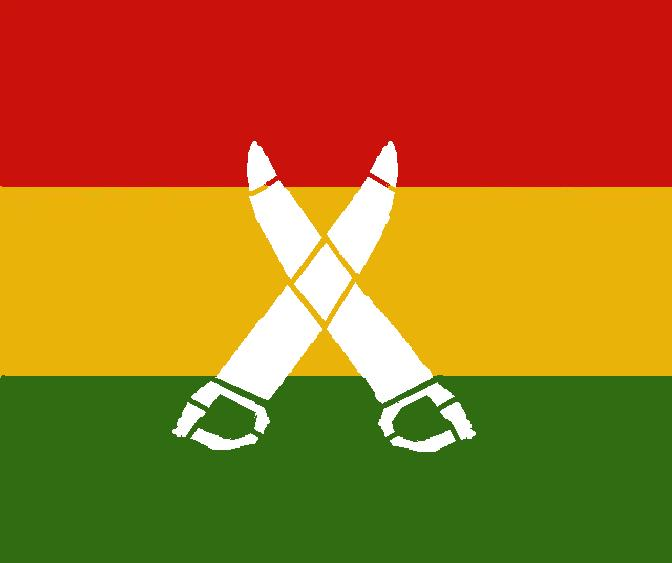
- President: Sohan Singh Bhakna
- Founded: 15 July 1913; 113 years ago
- Dissolved: January 1948; 78 years ago
- Succeeded by: Kirti movement and Babbar Akali movement
- Headquarters: Yugantar Ashram
- Ideology: Indian independence Indian nationalism
- Colours: Red, saffron, green

The Ghadar movement or Ghadar Party was an early 20th-century international political movement founded by expatriate Indians with the aim of overthrowing British rule in India. Many of the Ghadar Party founders and leaders, including Sohan Singh Bhakna, went on and join the Babbar Akali Movement and helped it in logistics as a party and publishing its own newspaper in the post-World War I era. The early movement was created by the revolutionaries who lived and worked on the West Coast of the United States and Canada, and the movement later spread to India and Indian diasporic communities around the world. The official founding has been dated to a meeting on 15 July 1913 in Astoria, Oregon, and the group splintered into two factions the first time in 1914, with the Sikh-majority faction known as the “Azad Punjab Ghadar” and the Hindu-majority faction known as the “Hindustan Ghadar.” The Azad Punjab Ghadar Party's headquarters and anti-colonial newspaper publications headquarters remained in the Stockton Gurdwara in Stockton, California, and the Hindustan Ghadar Party's headquarters and Hindustan Ghadar newspaper relocated to nearby Oakland, California.

During World War I in 1914, the Ghadar Movement, a group of Indian revolutionaries, allied with Germany, finding common ground in their opposition to British imperial rule in India. Germany strategically considered these revolutionaries vital allies against the British Empire. Their collaborative goal was to destabilize British control through a multifaceted strategy, encompassing a synchronized effort to invade British India via Afghanistan, provide resources to bolster the Indian independence movement, and disseminate propaganda to incite mutiny within the British Indian Army. Consequently, some Ghadar party members returned to Punjab to instigate an armed revolution for Indian Independence. The Ghadar Mutiny, as this uprising became known, involved Ghadarites smuggling arms into India and encouraging Indian troops to revolt against the British. This attempt was ultimately unsuccessful, leading to the execution of 42 mutineers after the Lahore Conspiracy Case trial. Undeterred, Ghadarites continued underground anti-colonial actions from 1914 to 1917 with support from Germany and Ottoman Turkey, a period known as the Hindu–German Conspiracy, which culminated in a sensational trial in San Francisco in 1917.

Following the war's conclusion, the party in the United States fractured into a communist and an anti-communist faction. The party was formally dissolved in 1948. Key participants in the Ghadar Movement included K. B. Menon, Sohan Singh Bhakna, Mewa Singh Lopoke, Bhai Parmanand, Vishnu Ganesh Pingle, Bhagwan Singh Gyanee, Har Dayal, Tarak Nath Das, Bhagat Singh Thind, Kartar Singh Sarabha, Udham Singh, Abdul Hafiz Mohamed Barakatullah, Rashbehari Bose, Ishar Singh Gill and Gulab Kaur. The insurrectionary ideals of the Ghadar Party influenced the members of the Indian Independence Movement opposed to Gandhian nonviolence. To carry out other revolutionary activities, "Swadesh Sevak Home" at Vancouver and United India House at Seattle was set up.

In 1918, the party split into the Kirti Kisan Sabha, which had communist and socialist leanings and later aligned itself with the Indian National Congress, and the Babbar Akali faction, which was Sikh-centric.

== Etymology ==
The movement derived its name from the Punjabi word ghadr or ghadar often translated as "mutiny" or "revolution".

== History ==
=== Background ===
Due to farming becoming more economically unviable in the Punjab, many residents emigrated overseas for other opportunities, first to East Asia. While in East Asia, they learnt about prospects in North America, leading to them moving to the United States and Canada. Many of these early migrants were Sikhs, who had no traditional taboo for travel overseas.

Between 1903 and 1913 approximately 10,000 South Asians emigres entered North America, mostly from the rural regions of central Punjab. 99% of the 5,000 Indians who moved to Canada by 1908 were Punjabis, with 80% of them being Sikhs, often ex-servicemen and originating from the districts of Jullundur, Hoshiarpur, Ludhiana and Amritsar of Punjab. Many of them were illiterate farmers and laborers, students, and priests. Not only Canada, they also settled in the US. Places first settled by them in both countries include San Francisco, Stockton, Portland, Saint John, Vancouver, and Victoria. Early arrivees such Amar Singh, Gopal Singh, Tarak Nath Das, and Ram Nath Puri started promoting anti-colonial views when they got to North America, with the founding of an Urdu periodical, the Azādī kā Circular, which attempted to persuade Indians in the colonial military to oppose the British.

About half the Punjabis had served in the British military. The Canadian government decided to curtail this influx with a series of laws, which were aimed at limiting the entry of South Asians into the country and restricting the political rights of those already in the country. Many migrants came to work in the fields, factories, and logging camps of Northern California and the Pacific Northwest, where they were exposed to labor unions and the ideas of the radical Industrial Workers of the World or IWW. The migrants of the Pacific Northwest banded together in Sikh gurdwaras and formed political Hindustani Associations for mutual aid.

In the United States, organisations such as the Indo-American Society and Indo-American National Association were founded to assist South Asian migrants living in New York and Chicago. These groups invited Indian students to study in the United States, especially at UC Berkeley in San Francisco, California, by providing them economic support, such as through the India House, which provided free habitation (with similar India Houses appearing in London and Paris). These student-outreach efforts were led by Har Dayal of Stanford University, Sant Teja Singh of Harvard University, and Bhai Parmanand. Some of those who arrived were rebels rather than students. Har Dayal had come to the United States in 1911 to study at Oxford University but forfeited his scholarship to protest British-rule in India, with him returning to India and getting into legal trouble there. After returning to America, Dayal secured a job teaching Indian philosophy at Stanford University but got into trouble with the university after expressing anarchist views and overplaying his connection to Stanford. Har Dayal indulged in Buddhism and Marxism, making connections with German communists and Punjabi agriculturalists. Dayal met Ram Chandra on the campus of Berkeley University, with both figures playing a major role in the early Ghadar Party.

Nationalist sentiments were also building around the world among South Asian emigres and students, where they could organize more freely than in British India. Several dozen students came to study at the University of Berkeley, some spurred by a scholarship offered by a wealthy Punjabi farmer, Jawala Singh. Revolutionary intellectuals like Har Dayal and Taraknath Das attempted to organize students and educate them in anarchist and nationalist ideas.

Diverse groups of Indian migrants became united due to similar racial struggles and a shared feeling that they had left India due to colonialism. According to Emily C. Brown, Indian nationalism arose amongst these early immigrants due to racial tensions and race-riots existing in North American society between Whites and Asians, with Chinese and Japanese victims being supported by the governments of China and Japan while there was no Indian government advocating for the rights of Indians abroad. The Indians were also mocked for being "slaves". Targeting Indian immigration in-particular, the Canadian government introduced the continuous journey regulation, a mandatory $200 amount per immigrant, and tried persuading Indians to move to British Honduras instead. The wives and children of the immigrant men were not allowed to join them abroad due to discriminatory immigration policies. Thus, the Indian nationalists, some of whom had become citizens in their new country of residence, believed that they were unfairly subject to such treatment due to lacking any nation of their own. They attempted to secure their rights through organisations, such as the Khalsa Diwan Society in Vancouver in 1907 with branches all over British Columbia that rejected the British Honduran plan of the Canadian government. In 1909, the Hindustan Association was founded by Bhag Singh Bhikhiwind that advocated for native government, education, industrialization, and the safe-guarding from foreign-theft in India. It also had two periodicals associated with it, one in Punjabi known as the Pardesī Khālsā and another in Urdu known as the Svadesh Sevak. It also operated a Svadesh Sevak Home. The United India League succeeded the Hindustan Association on 15 December 1911. Persons such as Sohan Singh Bhakna, Harnam Singh Tundilat, Udham Singh Kasel, Ram Rakha, and Ishar Singh Marhana like were involved in its activities and based out of St. John and Seattle. They were able to successfully defend against race-riots attacks by White workers in 1911 due to being united and armed. The Hindustani (or Hindi) Association of the West Coast was founded in Portland in 1912 with Sohan Singh Bhakna as president and G. D. Kumar as General-Secretary (Kumar was later replaced by Lala Har Dayal due to illness). The organisation ran a weekly Urdu periodical known as the Hindustān.

Ras Bihari Bose on request from Vishnu Ganesh Pingle, an American trained Ghadar, who met Bose at Benares and requested him to take up the leadership of the coming revolution. But before accepting the responsibility, he sent Sachin Sanyal to the Punjab to assess the situation. Sachin returned very optimistic, in the United States and Canada with the aim to liberate India from British rule. The movement began with a group of immigrants known as the Hindustani Workers of the Pacific Coast.

=== Founding ===
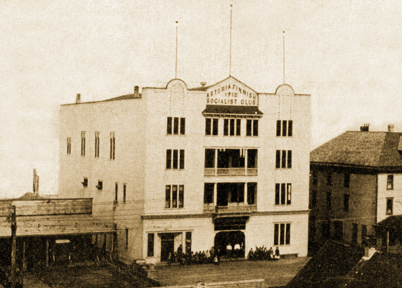
The Finnish Socialist Hall of Astoria, Oregon, where the founding conference of the Ghadr Party was held in 1913

Har Dayal and other nationalists on the Pacific West Coast of North America, such as in California, Oregon, and Washington State, became increasingly united between 1912 and 1913. The Ghadar Party, initially the Pacific Coast Hindustan Association, was formed on 15 July 1913 in the United States. In a May 1913 meeting of the association, they decided to found a Ghadr Āshram (also known as the Yugāntar Āshram) as the base for the Ghadar Party in San Francisco, with its operations extending to both the United States and Canada. The founding conference of the Ghadar movement was held at the Finnish Socialist Hall of Astoria, Oregon in 1913. The founding structure of the party was as follows:

Founding members of the Ghadar Party, 1913
No.	Name	Position
1.	Sohan Singh Bhakna	President
2.	Kesar Singh Thathgarh	Vice-president
3.	Lala Har Dayal	General Secretary and editor of the Ghadar (Urdu edition)
4.	Kartar Singh Sarabha	Editor of the Ghadar (Punjabi edition)
5.	Jawala Singh	Vice-president
6.	Waisakha Singh	
7.	Balwant Singh	
8.	Pt. Kanshi Ram	Treasurer
9.	Harnam Singh Tundilat	
10.	G. D. Verma	
11.	Lala Thaker Das Dhuri	Vice-Secretary
12.	Munshi Ram	
13.	Bhai Parmanand	
14.	Nidhan Singh Chugha	
15.	Santokh Singh	
16.	Udham Singh	
17.	Harnam Singh Kari Sari	
18.	Karim Bakhsh	
19.	Amar Chand	
20.	Vishnu Ganesh Pingle	

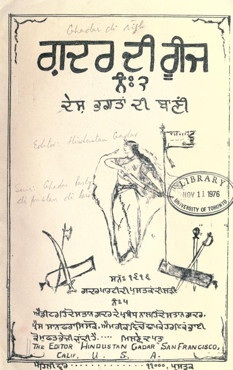
Title-page of the Ghadar De Goonj, depicting Mother India enslaved in chains, 1916

The founding aim of the Ghadar Party was the eradication of British-rule from India through an armed insurgency, expressed by them as follows:

Today, there begins in foreign lands... a war against the British rāj... What is our name? Ghadr. What is our work? Ghadr. Where will Ghadr break out? In India. The time will soon come when rifles and blood will take the place of pen and ink.

— Har Dayal, Ghadr, 1 November 1913 (first issue)

The goal of the independence of India was shared with the goal of achieving racial equality abroad for Indians. The members of the party were Indian immigrants, largely from Punjab. Many of its Members who were students at University of California at Berkeley included Dayal, Tarak Nath Das, Maulavi Barkatullah, Kartar Singh Sarabha and V.G. Pingle. The party bought a printing-press and established the Yugantar Ashram ("Advent of a New Age Ashram") at 436 Hill Street in San Francisco and the Nalanda Hostel on Center Street for students. Kartar Singh Sarabha was critical for finding funds for the movement. On 1 November 1913, the Ghadar newspaper was launched by the group to propagate their mission, which began being circulated in the diaspora across the world in the Americas, Asia, Europe, and Africa. Also in November 1913 at San Francisco, the party flew a red, yellow, and green flag which represented freedom, brotherhood, and equality. By 1914, the group claimed to have thousands of members across the world with branches in Vancouver, Portland, Astoria, St. John, Sacramento, Stockton, Panama, Manila, Hong Kong, and Shanghai. On 7 December 1913, the periodical of the party first reached India, where it was immediately banned by the British. However, it still managed to be smuggled into India subsequently.

=== Mutiny and arrests ===
With the onset of World War I, the party advocated for Indians to rebel against the British as British military strength was holed-up in Europe, leading its colonies more vulnerable. The Ghadar Party believed that turning the Indian soldiers in the colonial armed forces against the British would stir the general masses of Indians to also rebel. In order to convince British Indian soldiers to rebel, the party issued propaganda to convince them that they were "slaves" and "pawns" for the British colonial empire and a tool used to oppress other colonised peoples. An issue of the Ghadar newspaper stated:

News has reached that the British intend sending Indian troops to fight the Germans in order to save their white soldiers...When we will be told that Indian Sepoys are fighting the Germans in order to keep India in slavery. Look and understand, beloved brethren; even in Europe the British save themselves and get the Indians slain. ... Oh Indians, help the Germans. How and in what manner? In this way. Start mutiny in India...

— The Ghadar, 14 August 1914 issue

Between 1914 and 1918, the Ghadarites organised around 8,000 Indian migrants living in the Americas and East Asia to return to India for the anti-colonial insurrection, which was planned for 21 February 1915. They also visited military cantonments for recruitment for their mission and stockpiled supplies and arms for rebellion and sabotage. However, the British intelligence anticipated the plan and colonial authorities arrested hundreds of Ghadarite rebels as soon as their boat landed in ports. In 1914, Kasi Ram Joshi a member of the party from Haryana, returned to India from America. On 15 March 1915 he was hanged by the colonial government. Whilst in the diaspora the Ghadar Party found success, in India there was a lack of popular support for the Ghadarites. The Indian National Congress, Sikh priests of gurdwaras, and nationalists in India denounced the Ghadar Party.

The United States government considered the activities of the Ghadarites to be subversive and violating American neutrality during the war (considering the United Kingdom to be an American ally), leading the United States Immigration Service to hire intelligence officer W. C. Hopkinson to spy on the party and locate its leader Dayal. Hopkinson grew up in India and knew Hindi, making him able to penetrate into the organisation in Canada, Washington State, Oregon, and California. Hopkinson had earlier been sent by the Criminal Intelligence Department of the British Indian colonial government to Canada in 1907–08 to spy on the Indian diaspora there for possible sedition. Hopkinson soon compiled a list of the organisation's leaders, with Dayal as the most senior-figure in the group. W. C. Hopkinson's spying led to the arrest of Har Dayal in March 1914 by the American authorities, with Dayal leaving for Switzerland after making bail. Har Dayal faced execution in British India if he was deported there, causing him to flee to Europe by jumping his bail. Dayal would end up in Berlin, Germany.

Ram Chandra succeeded Dayal as leader of the Ghadar Party in the United States, and as editor of its mouthpiece. Chandra's rise to leadership coincided with efforts by the party to send rebels to India, with the plan starting on the same day that the British declared war on Germany on 4 August 1914. Chandra, Bhagwan Singh, and Maulvi Mohammed Barkatullah travelled through the West Coast trying to urge Indians to return to their homeland for a proposed February 1915 revolution, which was not successful. Dozens of men were sent back to India to fight abroard the S.S. Korea. In the aftermath of the Komagatu Maru and the related Budge Budge firing, Hopkinson was murdered by Mewa Singh, who was hanged for his crime. Due to internal jealousies against Ram Chandra, he was ousted from the group by Bhagwan Singh, Santokh Singh, and Ram Singh in January 1917 under the guise that Chandra was corrupt, which may have been an unfounded excuse. Bhagwan Singh, Santokh Singh, and Ram Singh were later expelled from the party by the Yugantar Ashram on 28 March 1917.

Some of the Ghadarites later attempted to conspire with the Germans to overthrow British-rule in India. Chandra was in contact with two German agents named Mueller and Brincken. Dayal ended-up in Germany and conspired with the Germans to send military supplies to rebels in India starting in 1915, leading to arrests and the Hindu-German Conspiracy Trial of 1917 in the United States, with American authorities claiming that Indians and Germans in the United States were conspiring to overthrow British colonial rule in India, which could possibly damage American-British relations. 105 Indians, Germans, and Americans were indicted by a federal grand jury in San Francisco, which was followed by the trial at a federal court which lasted five months. Those involved were part of the Ghadar Party and the German Consulate. Twenty-nine defendants (fifteen Indians and fourteen Germans) were found guilty and sentenced to prison.

=== Post-trial ===
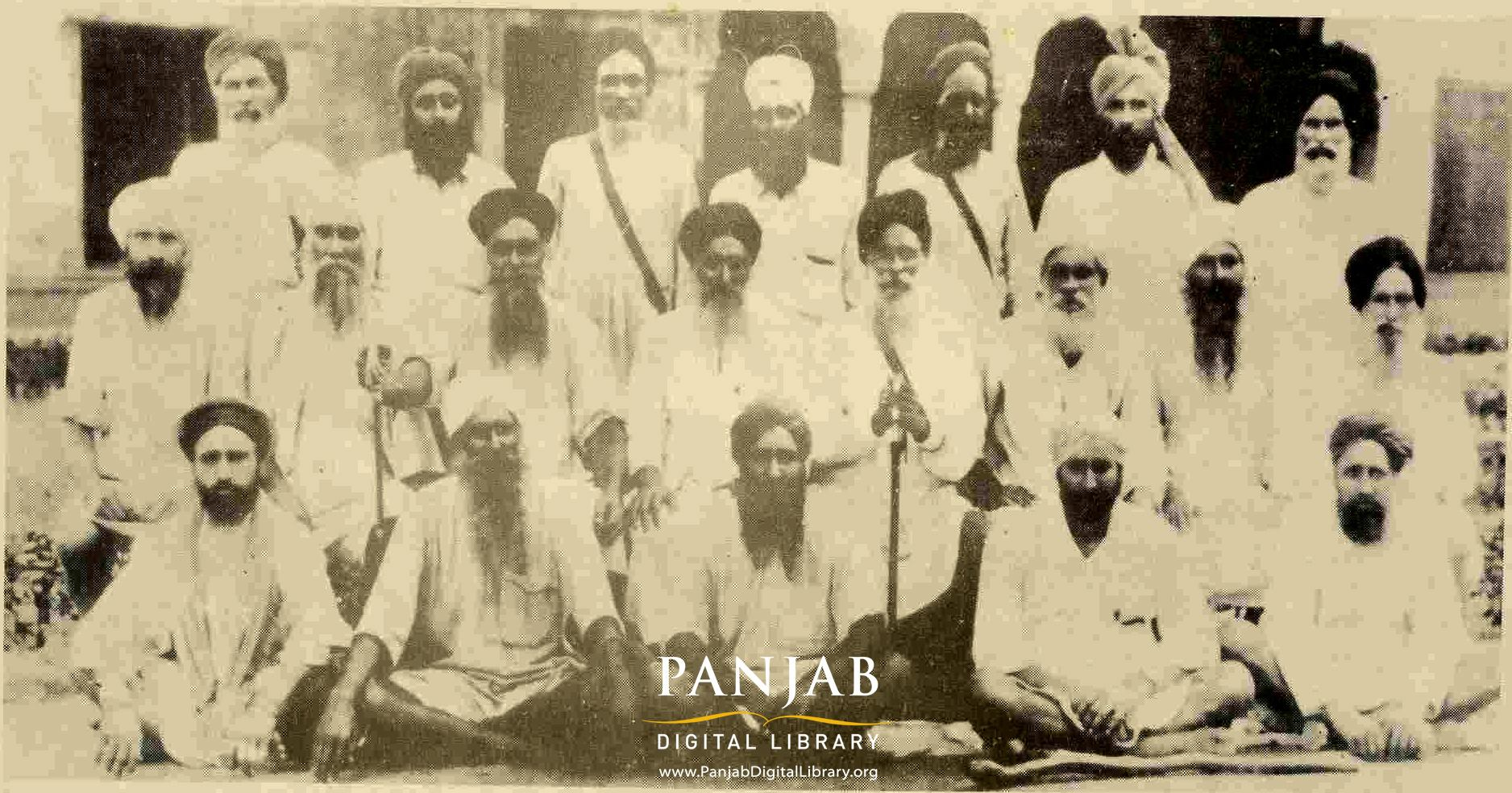
Group photograph of members of the Ghadar Party, 1936

Many Ghadarites were tried and sentenced for the conspiracy, which damaged the activities of the Ghadar Party, which shifted to 5 Wood Street. Founding member Har Dayal severed all connections in an open letter published in March 1919 in Indian newspapers and wrote to the British Government asking for amnesty. In August 1947, the Ghadar Party ceased to exist and donated all of its property to the new state of India.

== Structure ==
The organisation was composed of factories or railway workers' parties that chose their own committees that were under the party headquarters. An executive committee made up of the constituent committees operated the party's periodical and press. A three-party group composed of executive committee members managed secret and political affairs, with religion not being allowed to be discussed.

== Demographics ==
The leadership of the party was dominated by Punjabis and Bengalis, with Hindus, Sikhs, and Muslims being represented in the upper-levels. 90% of the party's membership were Punjabi Sikh men, half of whom were British Indian Army veterans. The group consisted of migrant workers, students, and intellectuals.

== Literature ==
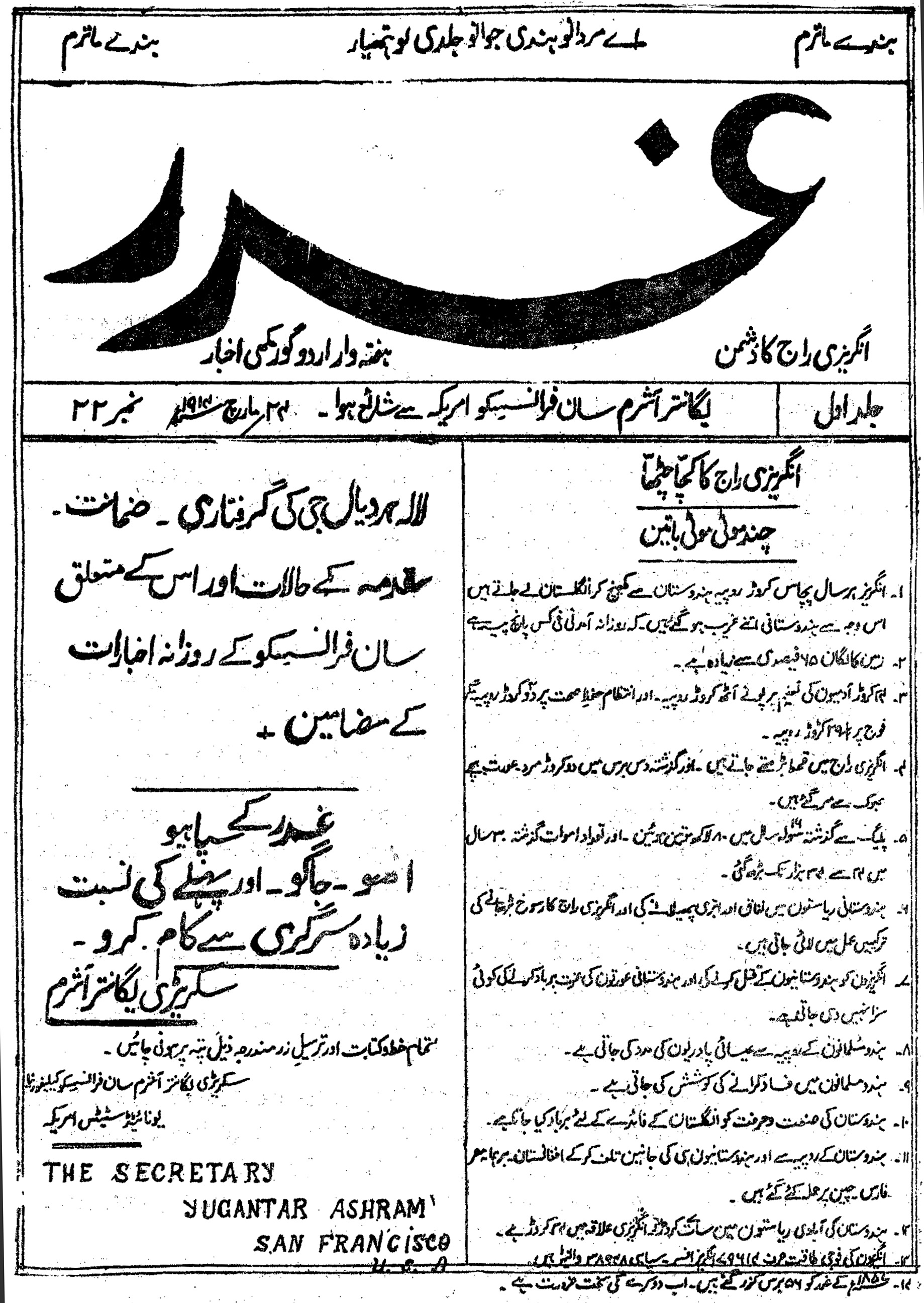
Ghadar Newspaper (Urdu) Vol. 1, No. 22, 28 March 1914

Har Dayal purchased a printing-press for the party that was operated at the headquarters at 436 Hill Street, San Francisco, California. The party's weekly paper was The Ghadar (or Hindustan Ghadar). The first Urdu edition was issued on 1 November 1913 while the first Punjabi edition was issued on 9 December 1913. Initially handwritten, the periodicals were later printed by a press. The periodical was distributed amongst the Indian diaspora throughout the world despite opposition by the British. The printing press of the party also published books that discussed the drawbacks of British colonial rule in India.

== Legacy ==
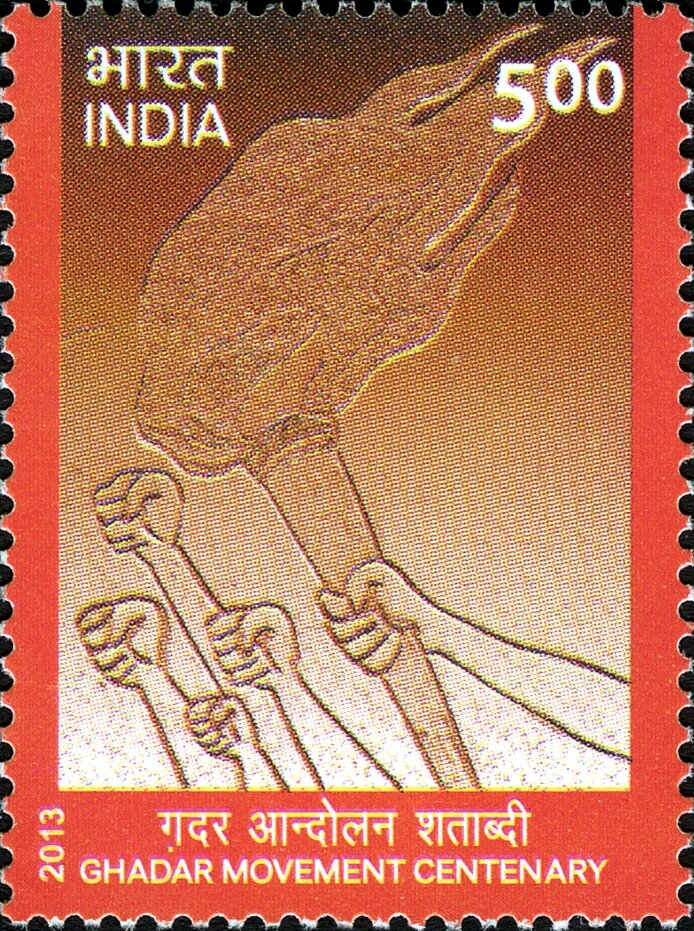
Stamp of India commemorating the centenary of the Ghadar movement, 2013

The original headquarters of the Ghadar Party on 436 Hill Street in San Francisco was demolished. A Ghadar Memorial is located on 5 Wood Street, San Francisco that is managed by the local Indian Consulate. A sister memorial is located in Punjab, India.

== Other notable members ==
- Bhagwan Singh Gyanee (President, 1914)
- Tarak Nath Das
- Aachar Singh
- Mangu Ram Mugowalia
- Amir Chand
- Maulana Barkatullah
- Harnam Singh Saini
- Pandurang Sadashiv Khankhoje
- Ganda Singh Phangureh
- Baba Prithvi Singh Azad
- Gulab Kaur
- Pt. Ram Rakha
- Sohanlal Pathak

== Gallery ==
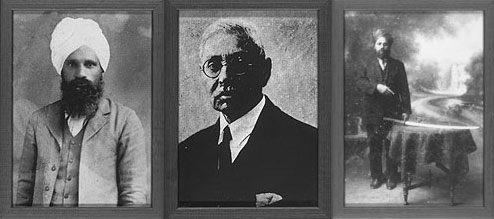
Ghadar leaders. Left to right: Sohan Singh Bakhna, Mohammed Barkatullah, Bhagwan Singh.

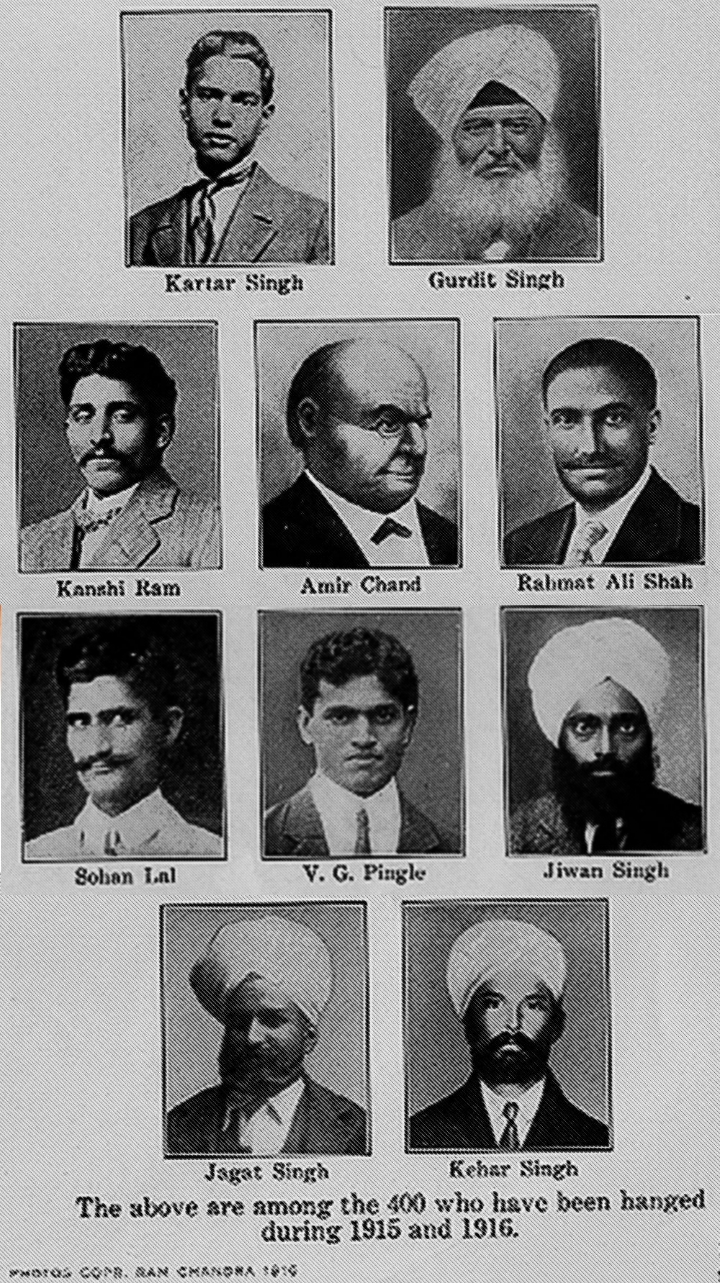
Ghadr Party heroes poster, 1916

The Independent Hindustan

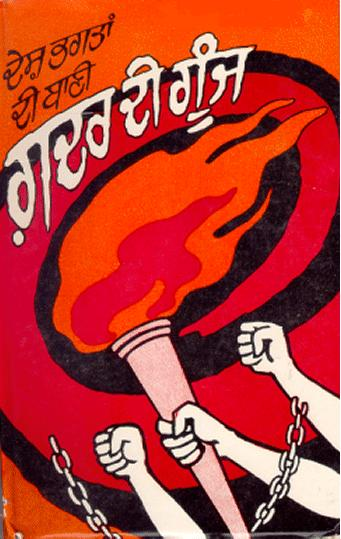
Ghadar di Gunj, an early Ghadarite compilation of nationalist and socialist literature, was banned in India in 1913.

== See also ==
- Communist Ghadar Party of India
- First Indian National Army
- Indian National Army
