= Bhagwan Singh Gyanee =

Indian politician

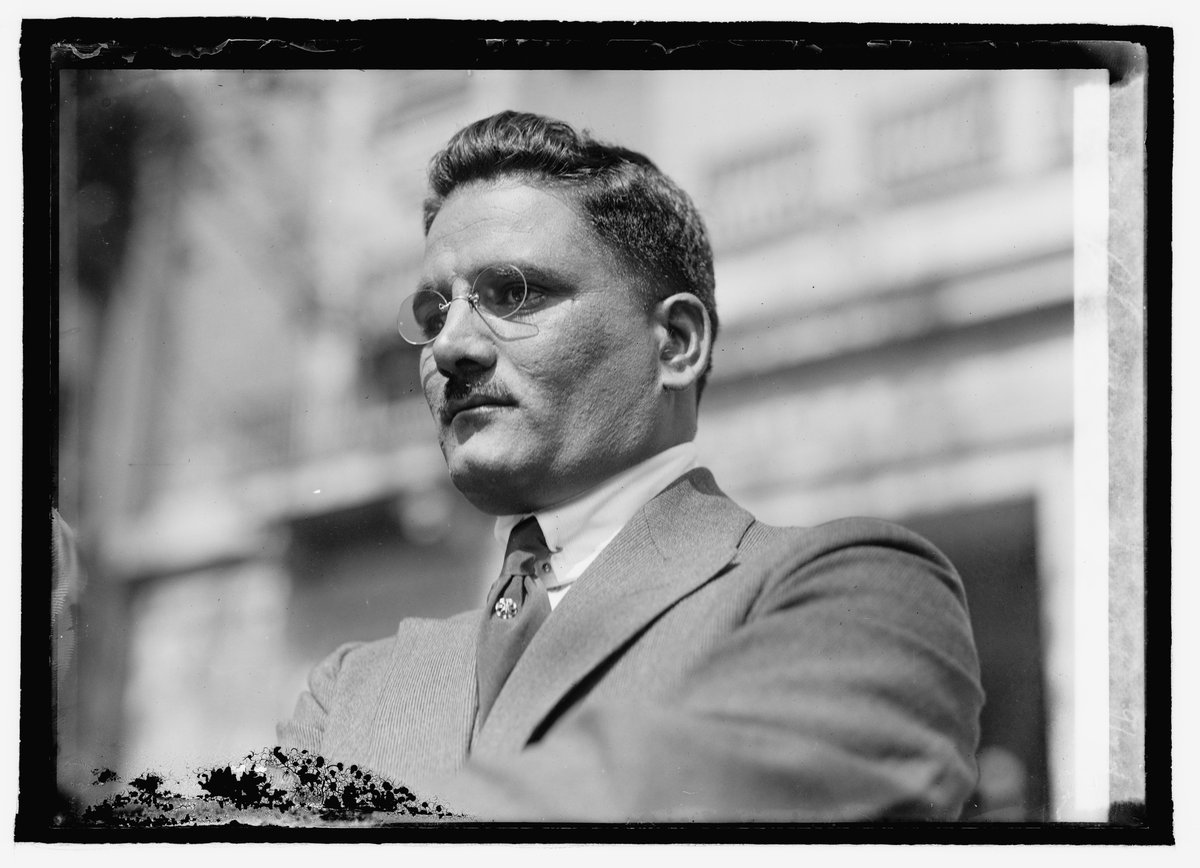
Bhagwan Singh Gyanee in 1919.

Bhai Bhagwan Singh Gyanee (July 24, 1884 - September 8, 1962) was an Indian Nationalist and a leading luminary of the Ghadar Party. Elected the party president in 1914, he was extensively involved in the Ghadar Conspiracy of 1915 during World War I and in the aftermath of its failure fled to Japan. He is also known for his nationalist poems that were published in the Hindustan Ghadar and later in the compilation Ghadar di Gunj. Convicted of violating U.S. neutrality laws, at the Hindu–German Conspiracy Trial, Singh was sentenced to 18 months in prison. Requests by the British government to deport him to India were rejected.
