= Ishar Singh Marhana =

Ghadr revolutionary

Ishar Singh Marhana (1878–1941), Akali activist and Ghadr revolutionary, was born on January 1, 1878, as the younger of the two sons of Bhai Jind Singh a Sandhu Jatt and Mai Chand Kaur of Village Marhana near Tarn Taran Sahib in Amritsar district of Punjab, a farming family.

He learned Gurmukhi in the village gurudwara and recited avidly his daily hymns every morning and helped his father and elder brother, Asa Singh, with farming. Still very young he was married to Bibi Har Kaur, daughter of Bhai Hira Singh a Jatt of village Khanpur in Nakodar Tehsil of Jalandhar district of Punjab.

In 1922, he set up a huge conclave of the Akali reformists in his own village, Marhana. In 1930, he was elected a member and vice-chairman of Amritsar Darbar Sahib Managing Committee for three years.

He died of a brief illness on 16 August 1941.
