= Sohanlal Pathak =

Indian revolutionary (1883–1916)

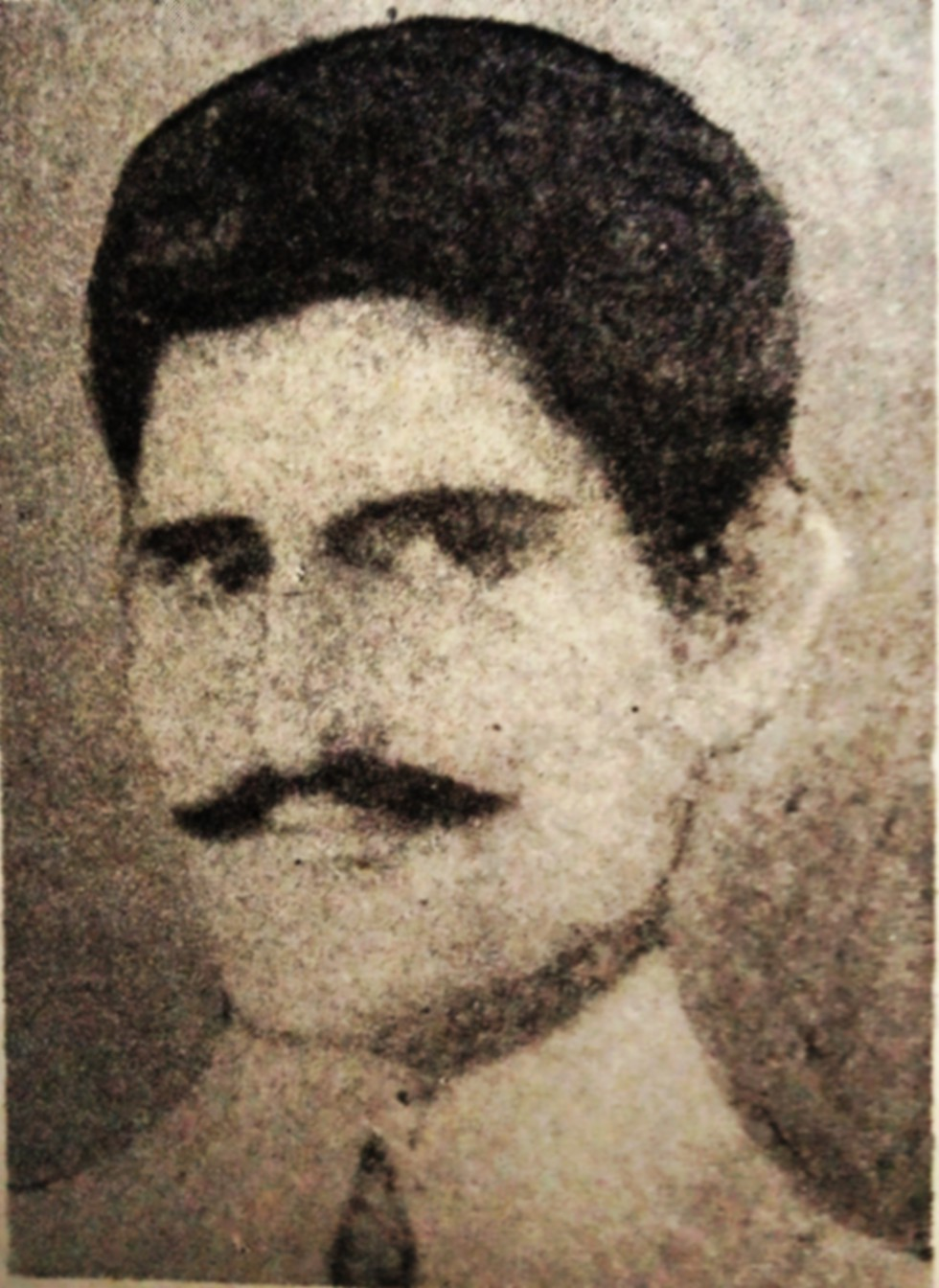
- Born: 7 January 1883; Patti, Lahore district, Punjab, British India (now in Amritsar, Punjab, India)
- Died: 10 February 1916 (aged 33); Mandalay, Burma, British India (now in Myanmar)
- Cause of death: Execution by hanging
- Occupation: Indian revolutionary
- Known for: Indian freedom struggle

Sohanlal Pathak (7 January 1883 — 10 February 1916) was an Indian revolutionary from Punjab, and a member of Ghadar Party. Remembered for his martyrdom and for his propagation of the ideals of the Indian nationalism in Burma.

In August 1915, he was arrested while organizing a rebellion in Burma. He was put on trial for conspiracy and treason against the government and sentenced to death. He was hanged on 10 February 1916 at Mandalay Jail in Burma.
