= Hindustan Ghadar =

Weekly publication that was the party organ of the Ghadar Party

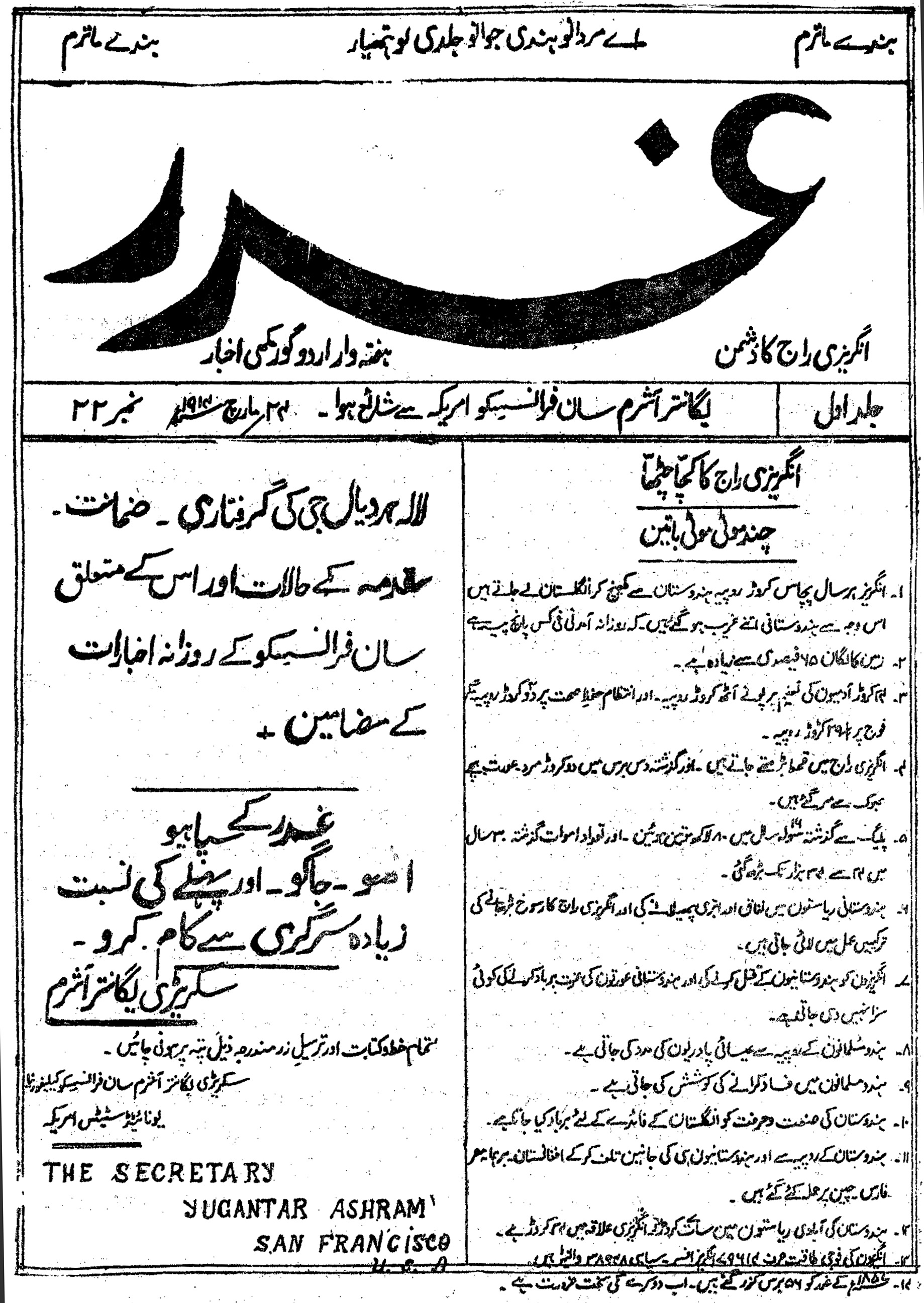
Ghadar Newspaper (Urdu) Vol. 1, No. 22, March 28, 1914

The Hindustan Ghadar (Hindi: हिन्दुस्तान ग़दर; Punjabi: (Gurmukhi): ਹਿੰਦੁਸਤਾਨ ਗ਼ਦਰ; Punjabi (Shahmukhi), Urdu: ہِندُوستان غدر), also known simply as Ghadar, was a weekly publication that was the party organ of the Hindustani Association of the Pacific Coast, which became the Ghadar Party. It had both a Urdu and Punjabi edition. It was published under the auspices of the Yugantar Ashram (Advent of a New Age Ashram) in San Francisco. Its purpose was to further the militant nationalist faction of the Indian independence movement, especially amongst Indian sepoys of the British Indian Army.

== History ==
In 1912–1913, the Pacific Coast Hindustan Association was formed by Indian immigrants under the leadership of Har Dayal, with Sohan Singh Bhakna as its president, which later came to be called the Ghadar Party. With donations raised with the help of the Indian diaspora, especially with the aid of Indian students at the University of California, Berkeley, the party established the Yugantar Ashram where a printing press was set up with the donations. The first Urdu edition of Hindustan Ghadar appeared on 1 November 1913, followed by a Punjabi edition 9 December 1913. Initially handwritten, the periodicals were later printed by a press. Careful measures were taken to shield the party and its supporters from British intelligence, which included the measure of memorising over a thousand names of the subscribers so that no incriminating evidence could fall into the hands of the British government.

The paper was printed using a small hand press and its office was the Yugantar Ashram, at 436 Hill Street in San Francisco, California. Har Dayal had Indian students at Berkeley University write articles advocating for Indian independence. Diasporic Indian farmers in the Pacific West, such as in California, Washington, and Oregon states, helped support the operation of the paper via donations. Bhagat Singh Thind was responsible for distributing the paper across rural areas in the region and collecting funds.

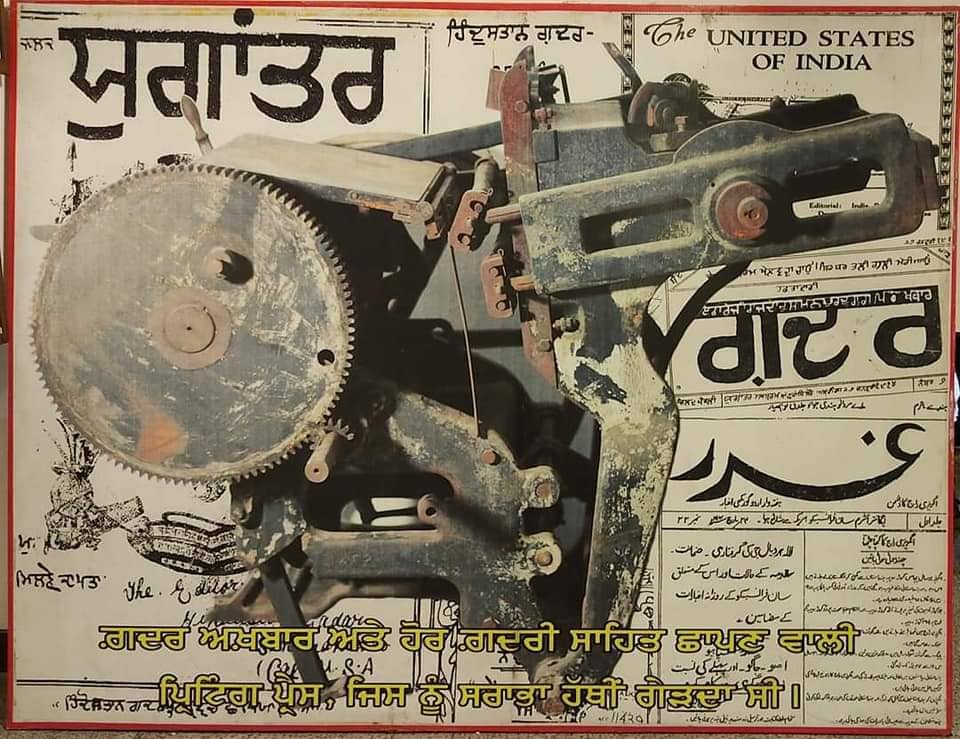
Printing machine of the Ghadar newspaper

The periodical was managed by the executive committee of the Ghadar Party. The monthly cost for a subscription was $1. The early issues carried the following words under its masthead: "Enemy of the British Government". The British failed to stop its circulation and it was distributed at Indian diasporic political centres on the West Coast of the United States and in Canada, India, Panama, Fiji, Japan, China (Shanghai, Hong Kong, and Hankou), Singapore, Malaya, Java, Sumatra, Siam, Burma, the Philippines (Manila), Egypt, South Africa, and East Africa within six months of its introduction. The paper advocated that it was the patriotic duty of every Indian to circulate the work. In circulation on a weekly basis were 2,500 copies of the Punjabi (Gurmukhi) edition and 2,200 copies of the Urdu edition. The paper first reached India on 7 December 1913 and was immediately banned by the colonial administration and they began searching all incoming luggage from United States and East Asia for smuggling of the banned work. To circumvent the ban, Indians began sending snippets of the periodical by cutting it into small pieces or reproducing its text via handwritten copies in private letters back to India. The paper was able to reach India via diasporic networks linking the Pacific Coast of North America to Shanghai, Hong Kong, Nairobi, Johannesburg, Singapore, Manila, Bangkok, Tientsin, and Moji. According to Ram Chandra:

No single society in India or even ten of them, published so many newspapers in various dialects, for in India or abroad no publishing house has, within the last four years, published so many and such excellent books which pierce the mind of masses and give them both enlightenment and enthusiasm, and which remain up to this day unanswered by the English Government.

— Ram Chandra, Hindustan Gadar, A Brief History of the Gadar Movement, by Ram Chandra, April 10, 1918., Record Group 118, Office of the US Attorney, San Francisco, Neutrality Case Files, 1913-1920, box 10, folder 1a. National Archives at San Francisco.

The articles in the paper were initially authored by Har Dayal, with the printing operation run by Kartar Singh Sarabha, then a student of UC Berkeley. Copies of the paper began to be shipped to India with returning Ghadarites and immigrants, and were quickly deemed to be seditious and banned by the British Indian government. Later publications from the Yugantar Ashram included compilations of nationalist compositions and pamphlets, including Ghadar-di-Gunj, Talwar and other publications which were also banned from British India.

In March 1914, Har Dayal was arrested by American authorities and eventually left for Switzerland but he left the control of the periodical's publishing to Ram Chandra before he left for Europe. Ram Chandra was helped by Bhagwan Singh and Maulvi Barkatullah with the paper. With the start of World War I, the paper urged Indians to help the Germans and resist the British. Internal infighting in January 1917 led to the ousting of Ram Chandra as editor by Bhagwan Singh, Santokh Singh, and Ram Singh due to claims of financial corruption lodged against him by the Council of the Yugantar Ashram, but he may have actually been ousted due to jealousy by the others as the paper was published in Ram Chandra's name. Thus, Ram Chandra shifted from Valencia Street to 5 Wood St. in San Francisco and published a rival paper with the same name. Bhagwan Singh, Santokh Singh, and Ram Singh was expelled by the "Public Servants of the Ashram" on 28 March 1917.

== Languages ==
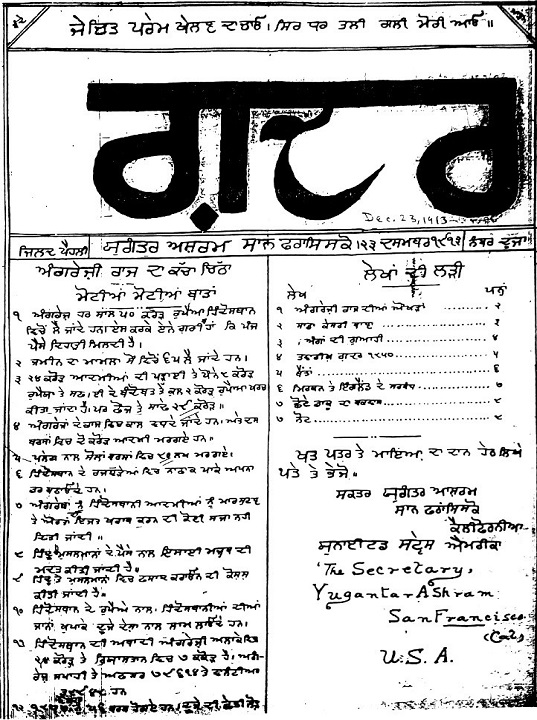
Front-page of the second issue of the Punjabi edition of 'Ghadar', 23 December 1913 issue

The periodical was originally published in two language editions, Urdu and Punjabi. Later, Hindi, Gujarati, Pashto, Bengali, Nepali, English, French, and German editions of it were issued.

== Editors ==
Editors of the Ghadar include Lala Har Dayal (Urdu edition), Kartar Singh Sarabha (Punjabi edition), and Ram Chandra.

== Digitization ==
Digitized issues from 9 December 1913 – 7 July 1917 are available at the CRL (Center for Research Libraries) Digital Delivery System.
