= Ghadar di gunj =

Literary composition by the Ghadar movement

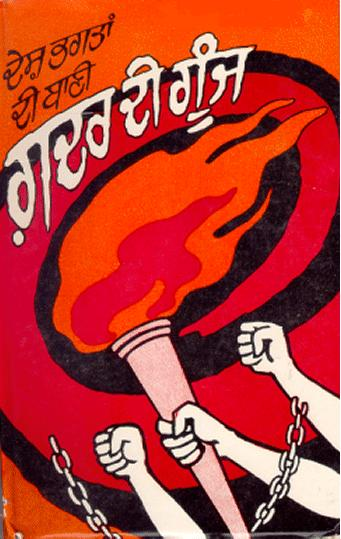
Ghadar di Gunj

Ghadar di Gunj (Punjabi: ਗ਼ਦਰ ਦੀ ਗੂੰਜ, غدر دی گنج, translation: Echoes of Mutiny) is a compilation of nationalist and socialist literature that was produced in the early stages of the Ghadar movement in the early 20th century.

Published by the Hindustan Ghadar press in the Ghadar weekly from San Francisco in 1913–14, the literature consists of a collection of songs and poems in Gurumukhi and Shahmukhi and covered addressed the political situation in India. Pamphlets titles Ghadar di Goonj and Talwar were also produced at this time for circulation in India. These were deemed seditionist publications by the British Indian government and banned from publication and circulation in India.
