= Har Dayal =

Indian revolutionary (1884–1939)

Lala Har Dayal
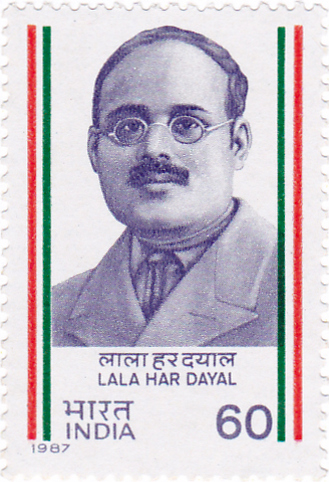
- Har Dayal on a 1987 stamp of India
- Born: Har Dayal Mathur; 14 October 1884; Delhi, British India
- Died: 4 March 1939 (aged 54); Philadelphia, Pennsylvania, U.S.
- Writing career
- Notable works: Our Educational Problem; Thoughts on Education; Hints for Self Culture; Glimpses of World Religions; The Bodhisattva Doctrines in Buddhist Sanskrit Literature

Lala Har Dayal Mathur (Punjabi: ਲਾਲਾ ਹਰਦਿਆਲ; 14 October 1884 – 4 March 1939) was an Indian nationalist revolutionary and freedom fighter. He was a polymath who turned down a career in the Indian Civil Service. His simple living and intellectual acumen inspired many expatriate Indians living in Canada and the U.S. in their campaign against British rule in India during the First World War.

== Biography ==
Har Dayal Mathur was born in a Hindu Mathur Kayastha family on 14 October 1884 in Delhi. He studied at the Cambridge Mission School and received his bachelor's degree in Sanskrit from St. Stephen's College, Delhi and his master's degree also in Sanskrit from Punjab University. In 1905, he received two scholarships of Oxford University for his higher studies in Sanskrit: Boden Scholarship, 1907 and Casberd Exhibitioner, an award from St John's College, where he was studying.

He moved to the United States in 1911, where he became involved in industrial unionism. He had also served as secretary of the San Francisco branch of the Industrial Workers of the World alongside Fritz Wolffheim, (later a National Bolshevik after he had left IWW and joined the Communist Workers' Party of Germany). In a statement outlining the principles of the Fraternity of the Red Flag, he said they proposed "the establishment of Communism, and the abolition of private property in land and capital through an industrial organization and the general strike, ultimate abolition of the coercive organization of government". A little over a year later, this group was given 6 acres (24,000 m^{2}) of land and a house in Oakland, where he founded the Bakunin Institute of California, which he described as "the first monastery of anarchism".

In California, he soon developed contacts with Punjabi Sikh farmers in Stockton. Punjabis, a great majority of whom were Sikhs, had started emigrating to the West Coast around the turn of the century. Having experienced hostility by the Canadians in Vancouver, they had already become disaffected with the British. Hardayal tapped into this sentiment of these energetic Sikhs and other Punjabis. Having developed an Indian nationalist perspective, he encouraged young Indians to gain scientific and sociological education.

On March 16, 1914, he was arrested by the United States immigration authorities for deportation as an undesirable alien. He skipped bail and fled to Switzerland. He ended up in Berlin, Germany. In Berlin he became instrumental to the formation of the Berlin Committee (later: Indian Independence Committee) and cooperated with the German Intelligence Bureau for the East.

He died in Philadelphia on 4 March 1939. In the evening of his death, he delivered a lecture as usual where he had said: "I am in peace with all". But a very close friend of Lala Hardayal and the founder member of Bharat Mata Society (established in 1907), Lala Hanumant Sahai, did not accept the death as natural, he suspected it as poisoning.

In 1987, the India Department of Posts issued a commemorative stamp in his honor, within the series of "India's Struggle for Freedom".

== Selected works ==
Some of his books with available references are listed below:

1. Our Educational Problem: Collection of Lalaji's articles. It was published in Punjabi, from Lahore, as a 1922 book with introduction by Lala Lajpat Rai
2. Thoughts on Education: Lalaji wrote many articles in Punjabi (published from Lahore) and Modern Review (published from Calcutta); most of them were against the Education Policy of British Government in India. Mr Hem Chand Kaushik gave to the author this book which he published in July 1969.
3. Social Conquest of Hindu Race: A booklet containing 21 pages, proscribed by British Raj and kept in National Archives of India under Acc.No.74. (Ref:Patriotic s Banned by the Raj)
4. Writings of Lala Har Dayal: This book was published in 1920 by Swaraj Publishing House, Varanasi, as mentioned in the book by Vishwa Nath Prasad Verma Adhunik Bhartiya Rajneetik Chintan on page 389.
5. Dayal, Har (1920). Forty-four months in Germany and Turkey, February 1915 to October 1918, a record of personal impressions. London, King.: This book was published in 1920 by P.S. King and Sons in London when Lalaji was living in Sweden. Ganesh Shankar Vidyarthy quoted many references from this book in his Kranti Ka Udghosh.
6. Lala Har Dayal Ji Ke Swadhin Vichar: This book was translated into Hindi by Sri Narayan Prasad Arora and was published in Raghunandan Press, Kanpur by Pt. Ganga Narayan Shukla in 1922. It can be seen in Seth Soorajmull Jalan Library, Calcutta.
7. Amrit me Vish: This was the Hindi Translation of above book 'Thoughts on Education'. It was published by Lajpat Rai Prithviraj Sahni from Lohari Gate, Lahore in the year 1922. In the National Library, Calcutta under catalogue no 181.Rc.92.33.
8. Hints for Self Culture: This famous book of Lala Har Dayal was published by Hy.S.L.Polak and Co. London (U.K) in 1934. Jaico Publishing House published it in 1977 from Bombay by obtaining copyright from its original publisher in 1961. Its Hindi Translation has also been published from Kitab Ghar, Delhi (India) in 1997 under the title 'Vyaktitva Vikas-Sangharsh aur Safalata'.
9. Glimpses of World Religions': It was the presentation of several religions by Lala Har Dayal from so many angles of history, ethics, theology, and religious philosophy. It reflects the individuality of every religion in a rational way of thinking. This book was also published by Jaico Publishing House India from Bombay.
10. Bodhisattva Doctrines: Lala Lajpat Rai, who was a mentor of Har Dayal, had suggested him to write an authentic book based on the principles of Gautam Buddha. In 1927 when Har Dayal was not given permission by the British Government to return to India, he decided to remain in London. He wrote this book and presented it to the university as a thesis. The book was approved for Ph.D. and a Doctorate was awarded to him in 1932. It was published from London in the year 1932. Motilal Banarsidass Publishers of India re-published this book in 1970 as The Bodhisattva Doctrines in Buddhist Sanskrit Literature.

=== The Bodhisattva Doctrines in Buddhist Sanskrit Literature ===
This 392-page work of Lala Hardayal consists of 7 chapters which deal with the Bodhisattva doctrine as expounded in the principal Buddhist Sanskrit Literature.

- In Chapter I the nature of the Bodhisattva doctrine is described, with particular emphasis upon the distinct characteristics of arhat, Bodhisattva, and Śrāvaka.
- Chapter II recounts the different factors which contributed to the rise and growth of the Bodhisattva doctrine including the influences of Persian religio-cult, Greek art, and Christian ethics.
- In Chapter III the production of the thought of Enlightenment for the welfare and liberation of all creatures is expounded.
- Chapters IV describes thirty-seven practices and principles conducive to the attainment of Enlightenment.
- In Chapter V ten perfections that lead to welfare, rebirth, serenity, spiritual cultivation, and supreme knowledge are explained.
- Chapter VI defines different stages of spiritual progress in the aspirant's long journey to the goal of final emancipation.
- The last Chapter VII relates the events of the Gautama Buddha's past lives as Bodhisattva.

This book contains comprehensive notes and references besides a general index appended at the end. This book has been written in a particularly lucid style which exhibits scholarly acumen and the mastery of Lala Hardayal in literary art. It proved influential with Edward Conze, a German Marxist refugee from Nazi Germany who made Har Dayal 's acquaintance in London in the 1930s.

== Appreciations ==
According to Swami Rama Tirtha, Lala Har Dayal was the greatest Hindu who ever came to America, a great sage and saint, whose life mirrored the highest spirituality as his soul reflected the love of the 'Universal Spirit' whom he tried to realise.

In another appreciation Prof. Dharmavira has sketched the picture of Lala Har Dayal which is being quoted here in verbatim:

Har Dayal dedicated his whole life to the sacred cause of the motherland. Surely from such a person alone could one ask: "Good Master, what shall I do to inherit eternal life?" Let us drink deep at this spring and wax glad and strong and brave in every nerve and fibre of our being. He was one of the race of those who wrote the New Era in blood. His course was laborious, truthful, simple, independent, noble; and all these in an eminent degree. His experience of the inward and the outward battle was not inconsiderable and it was not confined to his early manhood, but was spread over his whole life. Lala Har Dayal had the Janak and Dadhichi touch and his life demonstrated that he had what it takes.

— Prof. Dharmavira (9 July 1969)

== Legacy ==
He was portrayed in The Revolutionaries (TV series) in 2026.
