= MI5(g) =

Branch of British MI5 formed during World War I

The MI5(g), or the MI5 G section, was a branch of MI5 that was formed during World War I to address the wartime espionage operation by the Indian revolutionary movement in Europe. The department arose by renaming the MO5(g) MI5(g) in 1916. The MI5 itself, working under Vernon Kell, had a number of India experts at the beginning of the war. In September 1916, a special section, the MI5(d), was formed to operate counter-espionage networks throughout the British Empire. Another subsection, the MI5(b), was formed in January 1917 to deal specifically with Indians and "other oriental races".

The MI5(g) had 27 officers in its staff, eight of whom had served in India before the war. Among them were ex-Indian civil servants including Robert Nathan and H. L. Stephenson. The main emphasis of this counter-espionage network was to prevent the subversion of Indian troops in the European theatre. The organisation, especially under Nathan, worked closely with the Special Branch of the Scotland Yard in Britain and with the Indian Political Intelligence Office headed by John Wallinger, which operated a network of spies in neutral Switzerland which a number of the Indian revolutionaries and members of the Berlin Committee used as a base.

MI5(g)'s work at the time identified the plans by Ghadar Party and the Berlin Committee to assassinate Lord Kitchener in 1915 through an associate of Har Dayal, Gobind Behari Lal. It was also responsible at this time, along with Basil Thomson, for the capture of Harish Chandra (who was associated with the Berlin Committee) and turning him into a double agent. Through Harish Chandra was also identified plans for obtaining information of Ghadarite intrigues in Japan and China. Among other works, Nathan was responsible for the plans made by British intelligence in late 1915 to assassinate Virendranath Chattopadhyaya through an agent by the name of Donald Gullick.

== Notes and references ==
=== References ===
- Popplewell, Richard James (1995), Intelligence and Imperial Defence: British Intelligence and the Defence of the Indian Empire 1904-1924, Routledge, ISBN 0-7146-4580-X
