= Kalmyk Project =

Soviet plan to attack British India (1919–1920)

- Part of Soviet anti-imperialist strategy in Asia
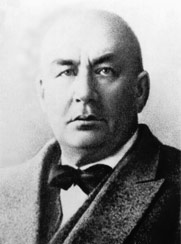
- Fyodor Shcherbatskoy, under whom the People's Commissariat for Foreign Affairs proposed to send a "scientific expedition" to Tibet
Date	1919–1920
Location	Central Asia, Tibet, North-West Frontier Province (British India)
Result	Abandoned due to logistical challenges and the Czechoslovak uprising

Belligerents
Russian SFSR	(United Kingdom) British Empire

Commanders and leaders
Nikolai Bravin; Leon Trotsky; Fyodor Shcherbatskoy; Raja Mahendra Pratap	F. M. Bailey (British intelligence)

Strength
Proposed: ~40,000 cavalry (unrealized)	Unknown
- Included plans to foment unrest via Himalayan buffer states and Buddhist Kalmyks

The Kalmyk Project was the name given to Soviet plans to launch a surprise attack on the North-West Frontier Province of British India via Tibet and other Himalayan buffer states in 1919–1920. It was a part of Soviet plans to destabilise the British Empire and other Western European imperial powers by unrest in South Asia. British Indian intelligence sent agents, such as F. M. Bailey, to Central Asia to trace the early Bolshevik designs on India.

Soviet Russia intended to nurture political upheaval in British India in its strategy against British imperialism. In 1919, it sent a diplomatic mission headed by the orientalist N. Z. Bravin. That was while Afghanistan had seen a coup d'état, which placed the young Prince Amanullah Khan in power and precipitated the Third Anglo-Afghan War. Bravin proposed to Amanullah a military alliance against British India and a campaign for which Soviet Turkestan would bear the costs. The negotiations, however, failed to reach concrete conclusions, and the Soviet advances were also detected by British Indian intelligence. Among other works, the Bravin expedition established links at Herat with the Austrian and German remnants of the Niedermayer–Hentig Expedition and liaised with the Indian revolutionaries of the Provisional Government of India in Kabul.

A later plan considered by the Soviets had the raising a force of nearly 40,000 cavalry troops from Turkestan or the Urals and advance to India through Afghanistan, with help from Afghan tribes that rallied against Amanullah. Leon Trotsky, then head of the RMC of the RSFSR, was a proponent of this version of the plan. However, the plans presented their own problems. Other routes to India that were explored included plans to foment unrest in Tibet and the Himalayan buffer states of Bhutan, Sikkim, Nepal, Thailand and Burma through the Buddhist Kalmyks and to use the places as a staging ground for revolution in India and the shortest route to Bengal, which was the centre of the revolutionary movement in India. That was to proceed under the cover of a scientific expedition under the Indologist Fyodor Shcherbatskoy, and it would arm the indigenous people in the North-East Frontier with modern weaponry before a regular supply could be arranged. The Kalmyk project may have been the brainchild of Raja Mahendra Pratap, who had led the Niedermayer-Hentig Expedition into Afghanistan in 1915 and later established the nationalist Provisional Government of India at Kabul in December that year. Pratap liaised with the Nascent Bolshevik Government and the Kaiser after 1917 to explore the scopes of a joint Soviet-German invasion of India through Afghanistan. The most notable meeting was Pratap's audience with Lenin, which was arranged by the People's Commissariat for Foreign Affairs in 1919, when he met him with a group of Indian revolutionaries from the Berlin Committee. The project had the approval of Lenin. Pratap had a strong obsession with Tibet and had made efforts as early as 1916 to penetrate into the Himalayan Kingdom to cultivate anti-British propaganda. His efforts were resumed after his return from Moscow in 1919. He was close to Fyodor Shcherbatskoy and Sergey Oldenburg, intended to participate in the People's Commissariat for Foreign Affairs planned expeditions to Tibet in summer 1919, and was privy to its designs for the region.

However, the project was ultimately curtailed after the Czechoslovak uprising in the Trans-Siberian Railway. Pratap himself set out alone unsuccessfully to pursue his goal in Tibet.

== Literature ==
- Andreyev, Alexandre (2003), Soviet Russia and Tibet: The Debacle of Secret Diplomacy, 1918–1930s, Brill, ISBN 90-04-12952-9
