= Robert Nathan (disambiguation) =

Robert Nathan (1894–1985) was an American novelist and poet.

Robert Nathan may also refer to:

- Robert Nathan (intelligence officer) (1868–1921), British intelligence official active in India and the United States
- Robert R. Nathan (1908–2001), American economist
- Robert Stuart Nathan (born 1948), American television writer and producer
