= Mansfield Smith-Cumming =

British secret service director (1859–1923)

Captain Sir Mansfield Smith-Cumming KCMG CB
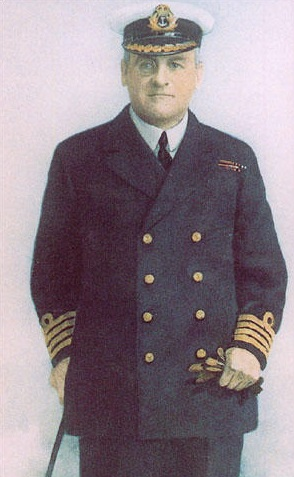

1st Chief of the Secret Intelligence Service
- In office 7 October 1909 – 14 June 1923
- Counterpart: Vernon Kell
- Preceded by: Position established
- Succeeded by: Hugh Sinclair

Personal details
- Born: Mansfield George Smith; 1 April 1859 Lee, Kent, England
- Died: 14 June 1923 (aged 64)
- Spouse(s): Dora Cloete (died) Leslie Valiant-Cumming (m. 1889)
- Awards: Knight Commander of the Order of St Michael and St George; Companion of the Order of the Bath; Order of St Stanislas (Russia); India General Service Medal (with Perak clasp); Egypt Medal; British War Medal; Officer of the Legion of Honour (France); Khedive's Star; Order of St Vladimir (Russia)

Military service
- Allegiance: United Kingdom
- Branch/service: Royal Navy; Secret Intelligence Service
- Years of service: 1878–1909; 1909–1923
- Rank: Captain
- Battles/wars: Anti-Piracy Campaign; Larut Wars; Perak War; Anglo-Egyptian War; World War I; Russian Civil War; Irish War of Independence; Irish Civil War

Captain Sir Mansfield George Smith-Cumming (1 April 1859 – 14 June 1923) was a British naval officer who served as the first chief of the Secret Intelligence Service (SIS).

== Origins ==
He was a great-great-grandson of the prominent merchant John Smith, a director of both the South Sea Company and the East India Company. John Smith was the second son of Abel Smith (1717–1788), the Nottingham banker who founded a banking dynasty and whose business much later became National Westminster Bank, now one of the largest banks in the United Kingdom.

Mansfield Smith's father was Colonel John Thomas Smith of the Madras Royal Engineers who became Master of the Madras and Calcutta Mints and designed a machine for minting coins that was displayed at the Great Exhibition in 1851.

== Early naval career ==
Smith joined the Royal Navy and underwent training at Dartmouth from the age of twelve and was appointed acting sub-lieutenant in 1878. He was posted to HMS Bellerophon in 1877, and for the next seven years served in operations against Malay pirates (during 1875–6) and in Egypt in 1883. However, he increasingly suffered from seasickness, and in 1885 was placed on the retired list as "unfit for service". In early 1903 he was posted (as a retired lieutenant) to HMS Venus as it became coastguard ship at Southampton. Prior to being appointed to run the Secret Service Bureau (SSB), he was working on boom defences in Bursledon on the River Hamble.

His first wife, Dora Cloete from South Africa, died after they had been married for four years. He added the surname Cumming after his second marriage in 1889 to Leslie Marian 'May' Valiant-Cumming, heiress of Logie near Forres in the County of Moray.

== Head of the SIS ==
=== Pre-1914 ===
In 1909, Major (later Colonel Sir) Vernon Kell became director of the new Secret Service Bureau created as a response to growing public opinion that all Germans living in England were spies. In 1911, the various security organizations were re-organised under the Bureau, Kell's division becoming the Home Section, and Cumming's becoming the new Foreign Section, responsible for all operations outside Britain. Over the next few years he became known as 'C', after his habit of sometimes signing himself with a C eventually written in green ink. That habit became a custom for later directors, although the C now stands for "Chief". Ian Fleming took these aspects for his "M" from the James Bond novels.

In 1914, he was involved in a serious road accident in France in which his son was killed. Legend has it that to escape the car wreck he was forced to amputate his own leg using a pen knife. Hospital records have shown, however, that while both his legs were broken, his left foot was amputated only the day after the accident. Later he often told all sorts of fantastic stories as to how he lost his leg and would shock people by interrupting meetings in his office by suddenly stabbing his artificial leg with a knife, letter opener or fountain pen.

Budgets were severely limited prior to World War I, and Cumming came to rely heavily on Sidney Reilly (aka the Ace of Spies), a secret agent of dubious veracity based in Saint Petersburg.

=== World War I ===
At the outbreak of war he was able to work with Vernon Kell and Sir Basil Thomson of the Special Branch to arrest twenty-two German spies in England. Eleven were executed, as was Sir Roger Casement, found guilty of treason in 1916. During the war, the offices were renamed. The Home Section became MI5 or Security Service, while Cumming's Foreign Section became MI6 or the Secret Intelligence Service. Agents who worked for MI6 during the war included Augustus Agar, Paul Dukes, John Buchan, Compton Mackenzie and W. Somerset Maugham.

When the SSB discovered that semen made a good invisible ink, his agents adopted the motto "Every man his own stylo". However, the use of semen as invisible ink was ceased because of the smell it produced for the eventual receiver. It also raised questions over the masturbatory habits of the agents.

=== Ireland ===
The Government Committee on Intelligence decided to slash Kell's budget and staff and to subordinate MI5 under a new Home Office Civil Intelligence Directorate led by Special Branch's Sir Basil Thomson in January 1919. The powerful partnership of MI5 and Special Branch had managed counterintelligence and subversives during the war, but that was suddenly thrown into disarray. These bureaucratic intrigues happened at the very moment when the Irish abstentionist party Sinn Féin and the Irish Republican Army (IRA) were launching their own independence campaign.

Cumming and SIS (then MI1(c)) organized a new espionage unit in Ireland in mid-1920 called the Dublin District Special Branch. It consisted of some 20 line officers drawn from the regular army and trained by Cumming's department in London. Cumming also began importing some of his own veteran case officers into Ireland from Egypt, Palestine, and India, while Basil Thomson organized a special unit consisting of 60 Irish street agents managed by communications from Scotland Yard in London.

On Sunday, 21 November 1920, the Headquarters Intelligence Staff of the IRA and its special Counterintelligence Branch under the leadership of Michael Collins assassinated 14 of Cumming's case officers. Many agents appear to have escaped the IRA execution squads that morning, but Whitehall feared that more of its professional agents would be identified and suffer the same fate; this prompted the hasty withdrawal of most of the remaining SIS agents from Ireland in the days that followed.

=== Commemoration ===
A blue plaque was unveiled on 30 March 2015 in Cumming's name at the SIS headquarters at 2 Whitehall Court.

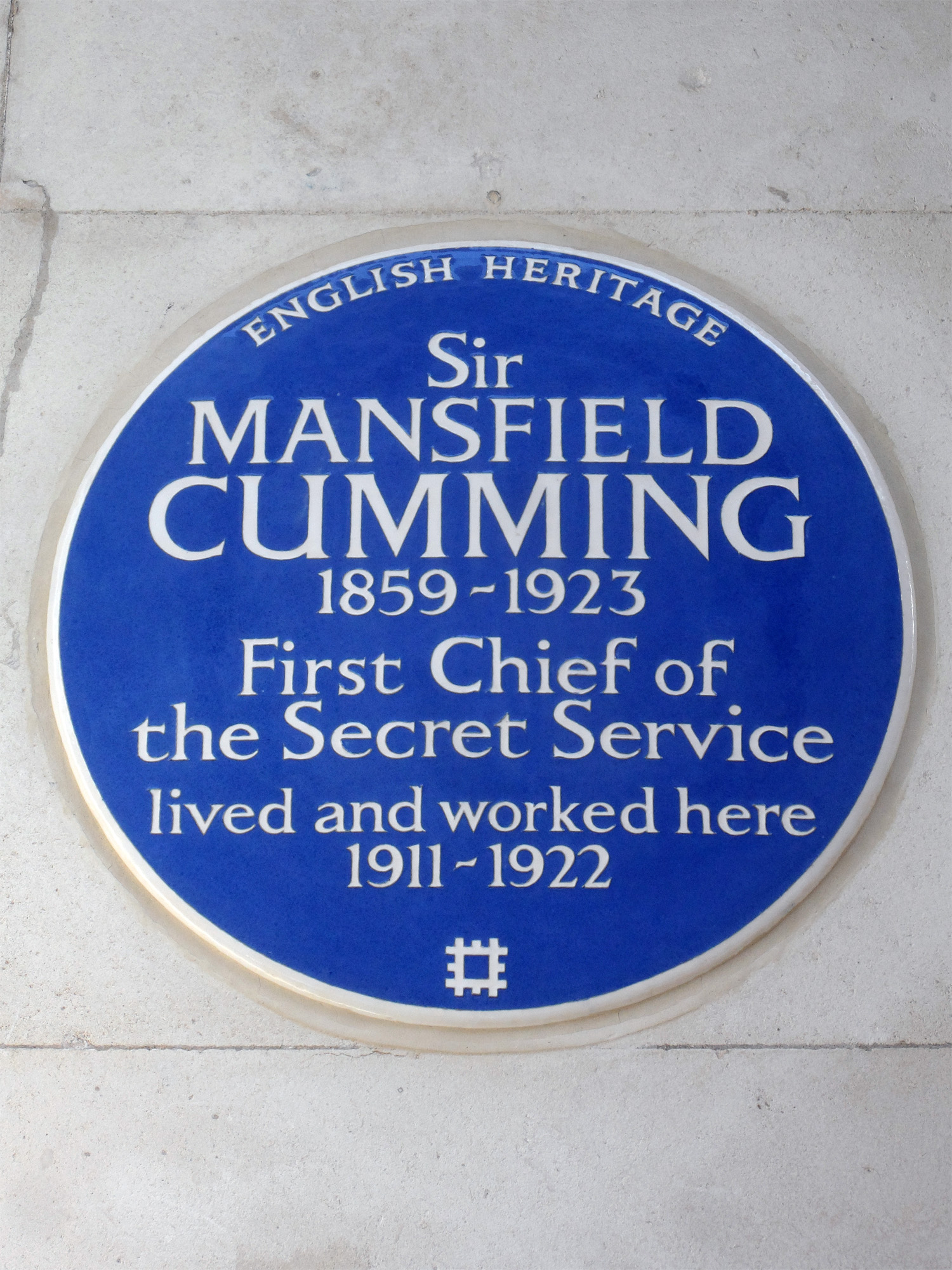
English Heritage Blue Plaque at 2 Whitehall Court, London SW1A 2EJ

== Portrayal in popular culture ==
- Cumming was the basis for the fictional head of the SIS, named Control, in the John le Carré espionage novel The Spy Who Came in from the Cold and other novels. In the movie version of le Carré's Tinker Tailor Soldier Spy Control signs his name as 'C' using green ink, as Cumming did in real life.
- Cumming was also the basis for the fictional head of SIS in the original James Bond novels by Ian Fleming. Fleming chose to name his chief M from Cumming's first name, Mansfield; this naming convention was extended to characters such as Q and R.
- In the television series Reilly, Ace of Spies, he was portrayed by Norman Rodway.
- He was portrayed by Joss Ackland in the BBC1 TV series Ashenden in 1991.

== See also ==
- Robert Bruce Lockhart
- Sidney Reilly
- Boris Savinkov
- William Melville
- Hugh Sinclair
- Grigori Rasputin

== Bibliography ==
- Andrew, C: Secret service: the making of the British intelligence community; 1985 ISBN 978-0434021109
- Cottrell, Peter, The Anglo-Irish War The Troubles of 1913–1922, London: Osprey, 2006 ISBN 978-1846030239
- Dolan, Anne: "Killing and Bloody Sunday, 1920", The Historical Journal, September 2006, Volume 49, Issue 3.
- Ferguson, Harry : Operation Kronstadt: The True Story of Honor, Espionage, and the Rescue of Britain's Greatest Spy, the Man with a Hundred Faces; 2010 ISBN 978-1590202296
- Hiley, Nicholas (1983). The failure of British espionage against Germany, 1907–1914. Vol. 26. Historical Journal. pp. 867–89. JSTOR 2639324.
- Jeffery, Keith: The Secret History of MI6, Penguin Press, 2010 ISBN 978-1594202742
- Judd, Alan: The Quest For C – Mansfield Cumming and the Founding of the Secret Service, HarperCollins Publishers, 1999, ISBN 0-00-255901-3
- McMahon, Paul (2011). British Spies and Irish Rebels: British Intelligence and Ireland, 1916–1945. Boydell Press. ISBN 978-1843836568.
- Milton, Giles: Russian Roulette: How British Spies Thwarted Lenin's Global Plot, Sceptre, 2013. ISBN 978-1444737028
- Popplewell, Richard J. (1995). Intelligence and Imperial Defence: British Intelligence and the Defence of the Indian Empire 1904–1924. Routledge. ISBN 0-7146-4580-X. Archived from the original on 26 March 2009.
- Smith, Michael: SIX: The Real James Bonds, 1909–1939, Biteback, 2011. ISBN 978-1-84954-097-1
- Spence, Richard B. (2002). Trust No One: The Secret World of Sidney Reilly. Feral House. ISBN 978-0-922915-79-8.
- West, N: Circus Mi5 Operations 1945 UNKNO, 1972. ISBN 978-0812829198
- West, N: Historical Dictionary of International Intelligence, Scarecrow, 2006, ISBN 978-0810855786

Government offices
Preceded by William Melville	Chief of the SIS; 1909–1923	Succeeded by Hugh Sinclair
