= Robert Nathan (intelligence officer) =

British intelligence official (1868–1921)

Sir Robert Nathan KCSI CIE
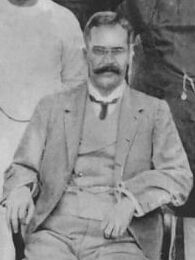
- Nathan as the Police Commissioner of Dhaka (1907)
- Born: 1868
- Died: 1921 (aged 52–53)
- Education: Peterhouse, Cambridge

Sir Robert Nathan KCSI CIE (1868–1921) was a British intelligence official notable for his work against the Indian revolutionaries in Bengal, Britain and North America.

== Early career in India ==
Nathan was educated at Peterhouse, Cambridge, before joining the Indian Civil Service in 1888. He was appointed secretary of the Indian Universities Commission in 1902, for which he was created a Companion of the Order of the Indian Empire (CIE) in the 1903 Durbar Honours. In 1905, he was asked to become Private Secretary to the Viceroy, Lord Curzon, but only two years later, in 1907 Nathan was made Chief Secretary to the Government of Eastern Bengal and Assam, and Commissioner of Dhaka Police. In 1908, Nathan, then the Police Commissioner of Dhaka, was responsible along with the district collector H.L. Salkeld for uncovering the revolutionary organisation of the Anushilan Samiti, and for instituting the measures to suppress the organisation.

== Return to Britain ==
Nathan was appointed Vice Chancellor of Calcutta University in 1914, and the same year returned from India on account of ill-health. He began his work for British intelligence against Indian revolutionaries in October 1914. After retiring from the ICS in 1915, Nathan joined the MI5's section dealing with the Indian seditionist movement in Europe, called MI5(g), that was formed at the time headed by Vernon Kell. Nathan's fellow officer at the time was another ex-Indian police official, H. L. Stephenson. He headed at the time the political branch of the Secret Service, and along with Basil Thomson who headed the Special Branch of the Scotland Yard, Nathan was closely involved in the interrogation of Indians who worked along with the Germans during the war.

Nathan's efforts, along with those of John Wallinger's Indian Political Intelligence Office (with whom Nathan worked closely), were key in the British counter-espionage work. Nathan identified plans by Ghadar Party and the Berlin Committee to assassinate Lord Kitchener in 1915 through an associate of Har Dayal, Gobind Behari Lal. He was also responsible at this time, along with Basil Thomson, to turn Harish Chandra (who was associated with the Berlin Committee) into a double agent. Nathan was also responsible for the plans made by British intelligence in late 1915 to assassinate Virendranath Chattopadhyaya through agent Donald Gullick.

== Work in North America ==
Later, on instructions from British secret service, Robert Nathan transferred to the Pacific coast of North America where the Ghadar Party worked closely with the German consulate at San Francisco to obtain arms and men for what came to be known as the Ghadar Conspiracy. Nathan successfully brought the Ghadarites and staff at the German consulate to trial following the Annie Larsen arms plot. He organised the Hindu–German Conspiracy Trial, which at the time was the longest in American legal history. He was responsible for the arrest of Chandra Kanta Chakraverty and his subsequent interrogation, along with that Ernst Sekunna. Through March 1917, Nathan worked closely with William Wiseman, and negotiated with the US State Department the details of the case against the Indian conspirators. He strongly supported granting a guarantee to the United States not to be held responsible for violation of neutrality.

== Later life ==
Nathan returned to Britain at the end of World War I where he died in 1921.

== Publications ==
Official History of Plague in India; Progress of Education in India, 1897-8, etc.
