= Vernon Kell =

British Army general (1873–1942)

Major-General Sir Vernon Kell KBE CB
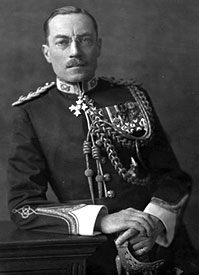
- Born: 21 November 1873; Great Yarmouth
- Died: 27 March 1942 (aged 68)
- Other name: 'K'
- Occupations: Intelligence officer, soldier
- Espionage activity
- Allegiance: United Kingdom
- Service branch: MI5
- Service years: 1909–1940
- Rank: Director of MI5
- Military career
- Allegiance: United Kingdom
- Branch: British Army
- Service years: 1894–1939
- Rank: Major-General
- Unit: South Staffordshire Regiment
- Conflicts: Boxer Rebellion; First World War
- Awards: Knight Commander of the Order of the British Empire; Companion of the Order of the Bath; Officer of the Order of Leopold (Belgium); Officer of the Legion of Honour (France); Officer of the Order of Saints Maurice and Lazarus (Italy)

Major-General Sir Vernon George Waldegrave Kell, KBE, CB (21 November 1873 – 27 March 1942) was a British Army general and the founder and first Director of the British Security Service, otherwise known as MI5. Known as K, he was described in Who's Who as "Commandant, War Department Constabulary".

== Early life ==
Born in Great Yarmouth, Norfolk, in 1873, Kell was the son of Major Waldegrave Kell of the 38th Foot and his wife, Georgiana Augusta Konarska, daughter of Samuel Alexander Ernest Konarski and Harriet Fraser Lucas.

== Military service ==
After graduating from the Royal Military College, Sandhurst, Kell was commissioned into the South Staffordshire Regiment on 10 October 1894, and promoted to lieutenant on 15 December 1896. He was in January 1900 seconded for service in China, and fought in the Boxer Rebellion later that year. He could speak German, Italian, French and Polish with equal facility, and after serving and studying in China and Russia, he learned their respective languages too. While he was on the intelligence staff in Tientsin he was also the foreign correspondent of The Daily Telegraph. He was promoted to the rank of captain on 24 September 1901, while still seconded in China where he served as a Railway Staff Officer (for which he was mentioned in despatches).

After his return to London from China in 1902, Kell was employed to analyse German intelligence at the War Office. He returned to a posting in his regiment from 1 October 1903, and was appointed a staff captain serving at the War Office on 9 February 1904.

Rising public fears in Great Britain of German espionage precipitated the creation of a new government intelligence agency. In 1909 Kell was selected by the War Office and the Admiralty as one of two officers, alongside Mansfield Smith-Cumming, to head the newly formed Secret Service Bureau. He retired from active duty on 16 October 1909, but remained on the reserve list.

== Intelligence service ==
Kell and Cumming decided to divide the intelligence work, Kell taking responsibility for domestic concerns, while Cumming was to oversee foreign matters. However, their working relationship was fraught, as Cumming advocated the separation of the Bureau's work into two distinct departments (which evolved into MI5 and MI6). The separation took place in 1910.

Kell was promoted to the rank of major on 20 August 1913. Following the outbreak of war in 1914, Kell was restored to active duty as a General Staff Officer Grade 2, and was promoted to the temporary rank of lieutenant-colonel on 5 September. On 1 March 1915, he was appointed a General Staff Officer Grade 1, retaining his temporary rank. For his service, he received a brevet promotion to lieutenant-colonel on 3 June 1916, and received a temporary promotion to colonel on 21 December.

== First World War ==
During the First World War, Kell headed MI5(g), a section dealing with the Indian seditionist movement in Europe. Among Kell's officers were ex-ICS officers Robert Nathan and H. L. Stephenson. Kell also worked closely with the Special Branch of Scotland Yard, then headed by Basil Thomson, and was successful in tracing the work of Indian revolutionaries collaborating with the Germans during the war.

== Between the wars ==
Kell was promoted to the rank of colonel in the reserve of officers on 1 April 1924. Upon reaching the age of 60 on 21 November 1933, he was removed from the reserve list. Kell received an honorary promotion to major-general on 27 September 1939.

In December 1938, having reached retirement age, Kell asked to remain in post on a year-to-year basis. With the onset of war, MI5 finally got the hiring and financial resources of which it had been starved for years. However, MI5 proved unable to deploy them without confusion and Kell and his deputy, both in their mid-60s, got the blame. On 10 June 1940 Kell was dismissed on the instructions of Winston Churchill, after 30 years in post. He was the longest-serving head of any British government department during the 20th century.

== Honours ==
Kell was awarded the following orders and decorations:

=== British ===
- Knight Commander of the Order of the British Empire, Military Division (KBE; 1919 Birthday Honours)
- Companion of the Order of the Bath, Military Division (CB; 1 January 1917)

=== Other ===
- Officer of the Order of Leopold (Kingdom of Belgium; 24 September 1917)
- Officer of the Légion d'honneur (France; 24 September 1917)
- Officer of the Order of Saints Maurice and Lazarus (Kingdom of Italy; 1 April 1919)
- Campaign medal for China
- 1914 War Medal

== Popular culture ==
Kell was the basis for a major character in Bert Coules's radio adaptation of Arthur Conan Doyle's His Last Bow.

Kell is depicted as an ally of a secret society of bodyguards attached to the radical women's suffrage movement in the graphic novel trilogy Suffrajitsu: Mrs. Pankhurst's Amazons (2015).

In Dennis Wheatley's novel The Second Seal, Kell investigates the book's hero, the Duke de Richleau.

In Bill Aitken's novel Blackest of Lies, Kell is involved in the concealment of Lord Kitchener's fictional death at the hands of the Irish Republican Brotherhood.

== See also ==
- James Edward Edmonds
- Sir Mansfield Smith-Cumming
- Sidney Reilly
- Sir Robert Bruce Lockhart
- William Melville

== Footnotes ==
Government offices
Preceded by William Melville	Director General of MI5; 1909–1940	Succeeded by Brigadier 'Jasper' Harker
