= Eric Holt-Wilson =

British Army officer

Brigadier Sir Eric Edward Boketon Holt-Wilson CMG DSO
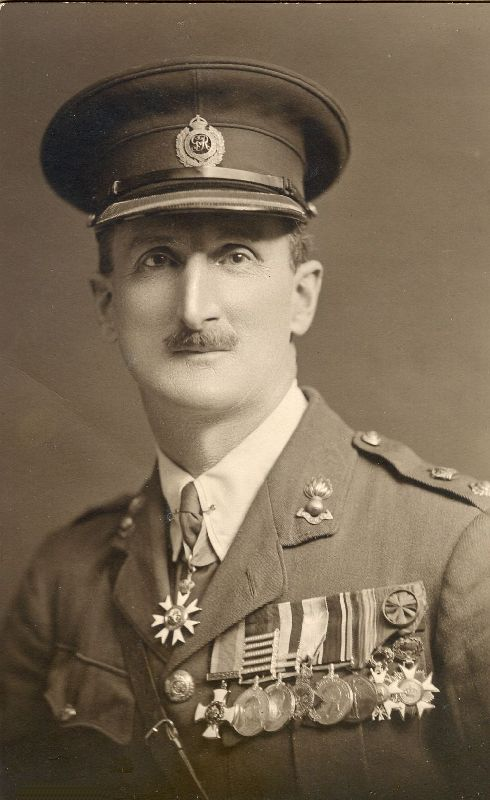
- Born: 26 August 1875; Norwich
- Died: 26 March 1950 (aged 74)
- Occupations: Intelligence officer, soldier
- Awards: Companion of the Order of St Michael and St George; Distinguished Service Order
- Espionage activity
- Allegiance: United Kingdom
- Service branch: MI5
- Service years: 1912–1940
- Rank: Deputy Director of MI5
- Military career
- Allegiance: United Kingdom
- Branch: British Army
- Service years: 1895-1912
- Rank: Captain then Honorary Brigadier
- Unit: Royal Engineers
- Conflicts: Boer War; First World War
- Awards: Knight Bachelor; Companion of the Order of St Michael and St George; Distinguished Service Order; French Legion of Honour; Officer Order of the Crown of Belgium

Brigadier-General Sir Eric Edward Boketon Holt-Wilson CMG DSO (26 August 1875 – 26 March 1950) was a British Army officer who left the army to join the nascent British Security Service (MI5), which developed in time to deal with espionage during World War I. He became the Service's deputy to Sir Vernon Kell, serving through to the beginning of World War II.

== Family life ==
Born in Norwich, Norfolk, in 1875, Holt-Wilson was the son of Reverend Thomas Holt-Wilson and his wife Helen Emily Greene, daughter of Edward Greene. He was educated at Harrow School from 1887 to 1892.

He was married twice, firstly to Susannah Mary Shaw in 1903 and secondly Audrey Stirling in 1931.

== Military service ==
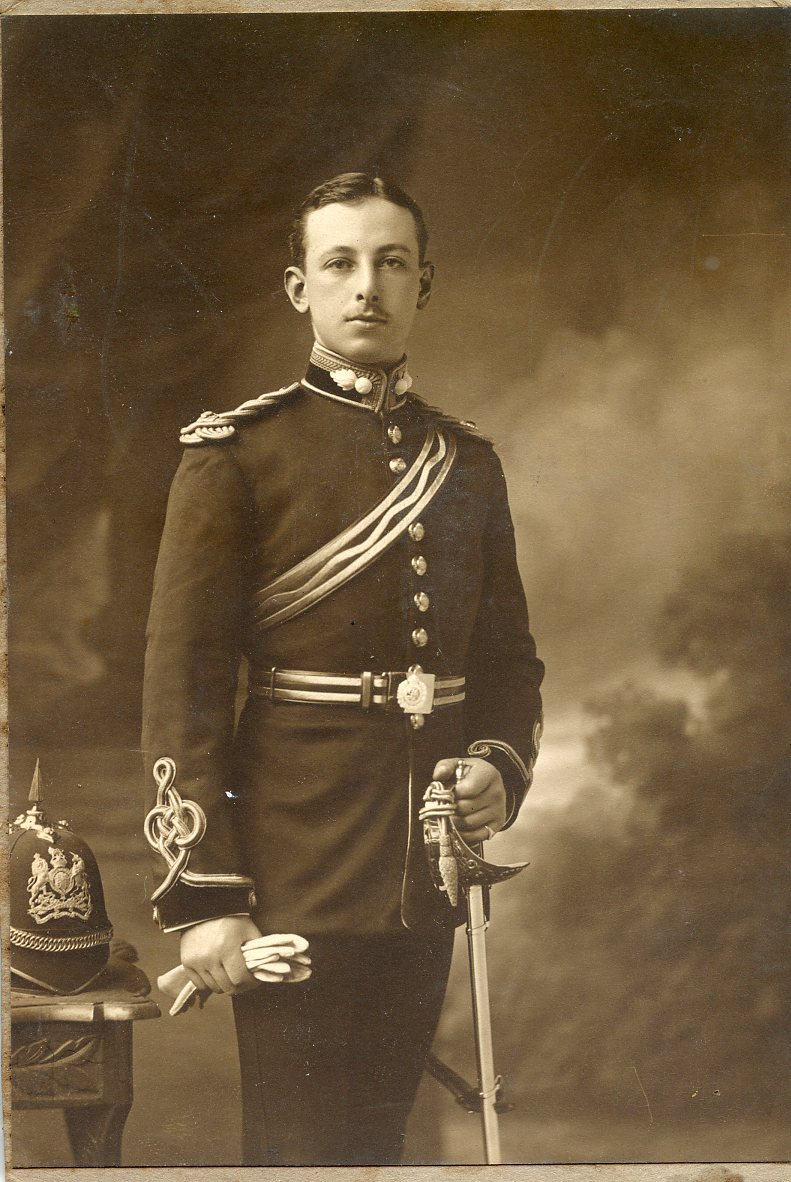
Portrait photograph of Eric EB Holt-Wilson, 2nd Lt, 7th Field Regiment, Royal Engineers, 1895

Holt-Wilson attended the Royal Military Academy, Woolwich from 1893 to 1895, and was commissioned as a second lieutenant in the Royal Engineers on 3 August 1895, and promoted to lieutenant on 3 August 1898. He joined 7 Field Regiment, Royal Engineers and was posted to South Africa 1899–1902. On returning from overseas service he became an instructor at the School of Military Engineering, January 1903–1906. He was promoted to captain on 3 August 1904. This was followed by a tour of duty as Cadet Company Commander and Instructor in Military Engineering back at the Royal Military Academy at Woolwich, 1910–1912; this was his last military posting before retiring on 21 December 1912 and joining the Imperial Security Intelligence Service.

His war service in South Africa was excellent and he was mentioned in despatches twice: on 8 February and 10 September 1901. He received the Queen's South Africa Medal with five clasps and the King's South Africa Medal with two clasps; and was created a Companion of the Distinguished Service Order (DSO) on 27 September 1901: "In recognition of services during the operations in South Africa."

== Intelligence service ==
Rising public fears in Great Britain of German espionage precipitated the creation of a new government intelligence agency formed by Vernon Kell in 1909. In 1912 Holt-Wilson went to work for Vernon Kell, then the Director of what was termed the Home Section of the Secret Service Bureau with responsibility for investigating espionage, sabotage and subversion in Britain.

Holt-Wilson served on the Imperial General Staff from 1914 to 1924. He remained a loyal and dedicated deputy to Kell and was sacked along with his director by Winston Churchill in 1940.

== Honours ==
Holt-Wilson was awarded the following orders and decorations:

- Was made a Knight Bachelor (Kt) in the 1933 Birthday Honours
- Companion of the Order of St Michael and St George (CMG)
- Distinguished Service Order
- Legion of Honour
- Officer of Order of the Crown of Belgium

== See also ==
- Vernon Kell

== Sources ==
- Intelligence and Imperial Defence: British Intelligence and the Defence of the British Empire, by Richard James Popplewell, 1995
