= Basil Thomson =

British colonial administrator, prison governor and police officer

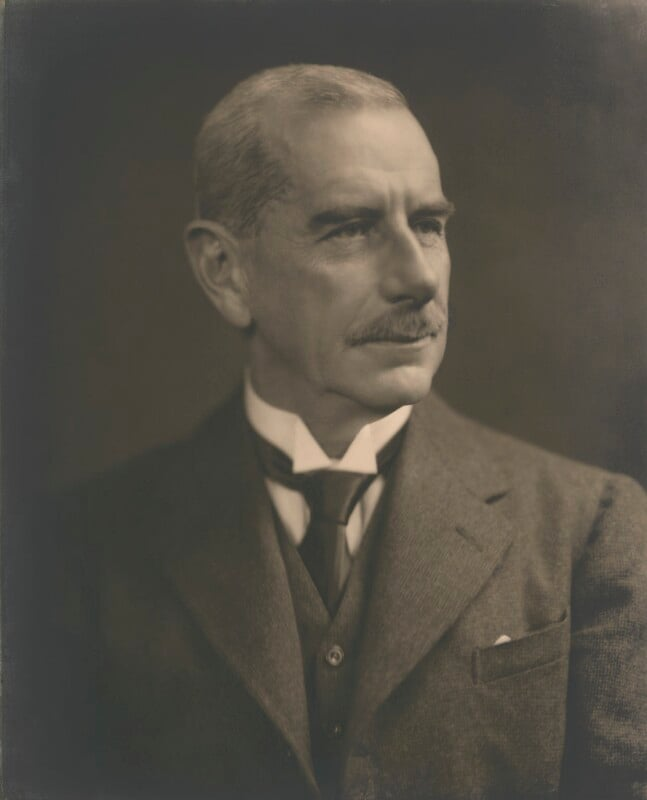
Sir Basil Home Thomson by an unknown photographer, late 1910s

Sir Basil Home Thomson, KCB (21 April 1861 – 26 March 1939) was a British colonial administrator and prison governor, who was head of Metropolitan Police CID during World War I. This gave him a key role in arresting wartime spies, and he was closely involved in the prosecution of Mata Hari, Sir Roger Casement and many Irish and Indian nationalists. His equating of Jews with Bolshevism led to accusations of anti-semitism. Thomson was also a successful novelist.

== Early life ==
Thomson was born in Oxford, where his father, William Thomson (who would later become Archbishop of York), was provost of The Queen's College. Thomson was educated at Worsley's School in Hendon and Eton College, and then attended New College, Oxford, where a fellow undergraduate was Montague John Druitt, the man named as the prime suspect in the Jack the Ripper case by Chief Constable Melville Macnaghten in a Scotland Yard document dated 1894. (Thomson replaced Macnaghten as head of CID at Scotland Yard in 1913.) Thomson ended his university studies after two terms, after suffering bouts of depression, and spent some time from 1881 to 1882 in the United States, working as a farmer in Iowa.

== Colonial service ==
In 1883, with the promise of marriage to a Grace Webber should he be financially secure, Thomson secured a cadet position at the Colonial Office, where he assisted Sir William Des Vœux, then Governor of Fiji. Arriving in Fiji in early 1884, he set about learning the Fijian and Tongan languages while appointed as a stipendiary magistrate throughout the islands. When Sir William MacGregor was appointed administrator of British New Guinea, Thomson joined his staff until he was invalided back to England after contracting malaria. Back in England, Thomson married Grace Webber in 1890, returning to Fiji with his wife in the middle of that year to serve as commissioner of native lands. When Sir John Thurston, the Governor of Fiji, dismissed the Premier of Tonga (Shirley Waldemar Baker) in his capacity as High Commissioner for the Western Pacific, Thomson was moved to Tonga, where he became assistant premier to Siaosi Tukuʻaho, the pro-British chief appointed as Baker's replacement.

In 1899, the United Kingdom and Germany signed an agreement formalising each country's rights and claims over Tonga and Samoa respectively. Given his inside knowledge of Tongan politics, Thomson was tasked with expediting the establishment of a British protectorate over Tonga, which was established on 18 May 1900 despite the objections of some native chiefs who wished to retain their traditional privileges.

== Writing career ==
After three years at the Native Lands Office in Suva, Thomson resigned from colonial service, and returned to England in 1893, due in no small part to the deteriorating health of his wife. In Ascot he briefly was supervising the education of the Crown Prince of Siam, Vajiravudh . He embarked on a career as a writer, drawing on his experiences in the South Sea Islands to produce South Sea Yarns (1894; written in Fiji), The Diversions of a Prime Minister (1894, about his government work in Tonga), and The Indiscretions of Lady Asenath (1898). Basil Thomson used his Fijian assistants to organise the first ever census of Fijian marriage on the largest island, Viti Levu. He found that Fijian men did not marry, as claimed in the specialised literature, their mother's brother's daughter, but married any woman and recalculated her kinship status after the marriage so as to address her by the term meaning mother's brother's daughter.

== Prison governorship ==
In the mid-1890s, Thomson read for the bar examinations at the Inner Temple, and was admitted to the bar in 1896. Instead of becoming a barrister, Thomson accepted the position of deputy governor at HM Prison Liverpool, after his name was suggested for the post due to a personal acquaintance with Sir Evelyn Ruggles-Brise, a fellow Old Etonian who had stayed with Thomson in Tonga. Over the next twelve years, he served as governor of Northampton, Cardiff, Dartmoor, and Wormwood Scrubs prisons. From 1908 to 1913, he served as secretary of the Prison Commission.

== Metropolitan Police ==
In June 1913, Thomson was appointed Assistant Commissioner "C" (Crime) of London's Metropolitan Police, which made him the head of the Criminal Investigation Department (CID) at New Scotland Yard. When World War I broke out in 1914, the CID found itself acting as the enforcement arm for Britain's counter-intelligence apparatus: while the newly formed Secret Service Bureau and the intelligence arms of the War Office and the Admiralty, collected intelligence on suspected spies in Britain, they had no arrest powers. As head of CID, Thomson was involved in the arrests in several high-profile espionage cases, including Lieutenant Carl Hans Lody and establishing himself a reputation as a "spycatcher". Thomson worked closely with the Secret Service Bureau's domestic wing (which eventually became the Security Service, MI5) under Vernon Kell and especially the MI5(g) section that dealt with the Indian nationalist movement in Europe.

Since the existence of the latter organisation was not acknowledged at the time, Thomson controversially claimed a large proportion of the credit in the successful British counter-espionage operations. In his memoirs, The Scene Changes, Thomson acknowledges only the works of Robert Nathan, who worked closely with him, and was involved in the interrogation of a number of Indian revolutionaries who worked with German Intelligence during the war. Thomson and Nathan's work at the time was key in identifying the plans by Ghadar Party and the Indian Independence Committee to assassinate Lord Kitchener in 1915 through an associate of Har Dayal, Gobind Behari Lal, as well as identifying the outlines of the Indian revolutionary conspiracy. Their efforts at the time also resulted in the capture of Harish Chandra (who was associated with the Berlin Committee), and he was successfully turned into a double agent. Thomson's efforts were also key in uncovering the first concrete evidence of Turco-German agents operating in the Middle East and attempting to destabilise Afghanistan and British India.

He interrogated Mata Hari, the Dutch exotic dancer later to be executed by the French as a spy. In 1916 she was taken off a ship sailing from Spain to the Netherlands at Falmouth as a suspicious person and brought to London where she was interrogated at length by Thomson. Eventually she claimed to be doing some work for French Intelligence. (A full transcript of this is in Britain's National Archives probably recorded and transcribed by Kathleen Pettigrew. Thomson himself refers to the transcript in his 1922 book Queer People).

Thomson's work as Assistant Commissioner of Scotland Yard Involved a wide range of investigations. His natural conservatism was given full throttle against suffragettes, then against spies from Imperial Germany and its allies, then against Irish nationalists, and finally against British Marxists. Thomson was involved with the spreading of public awareness of the "Black Diaries" used against Sir Roger Casement to prevent public support for a reduction of Casement's death sentence for high treason in 1916.

More controversially, the large number of Jews among the Bolsheviks before Stalin's purges led some to think he equated Bolshevism with Jews. He wrote anti-Semiticly shaded articles for a newspaper, the Whitechapel Gazette, owned by the highly questionable social figure Maundy Gregory. He burlesqued such views in his 1925 Sherlock Holmes spoof, "Mr Pepper Investigates", especially in Chapter 6, 'Blackmailers'. Thomson was appointed Companion of the Order of the Bath (CB) in 1916 and Knight Commander of the Order of the Bath (KCB) in 1919.

In 1919, while remaining Assistant Commissioner (Crime), he was appointed Director of Intelligence at the Home Office, in overall charge of every intelligence agency in the United Kingdom. From 30 April 1919 he issued a fortnightly Report on Revolutionary Organisations in the United Kingdom from his offices in Scotland House. One of Thomson's Irish agents John Charles Byrnes was a double agent within the IRA who identified Michael Collins but who was executed by the IRA in March 1920. In 1921 he fell out with Lloyd George and agreed to resign from his Metropolitan Police and Home Office roles, taking effect on 30 November that year. The reasons for this remain mysterious.

== The Hyde Park incident ==
In December 1925, Thomson was arrested in London's Hyde Park, and charged with "committing an act in violation of public decency" with a young woman, Miss Thelma de Lava. Thomson rejected the charges, insisting that he was engaged in conversation with the woman for the purposes of research for a book he was writing on London vice; found guilty of public indecency, he was fined £5 (equivalent to £263 in 2025). The story he gave the court (which his barrister, Sir Henry Curtis-Bennett, probably did not support) sounded totally peculiar. Thomson apparently lied (or told a half-truth) regarding his name, calling himself "Home Thomson" when he was arrested with de Lava. "Home" was one of his middle names. However he was recognised by the police. He tried alternately to bluster and to offer a vague bribe to the constables. When he presented his version in the courtroom he said he was researching a book on the danger of left wing agitators in England and he was together with de Lava waiting for the speech to begin. Had this been true, Thomson should have revealed in court who the orator was he was waiting for. He kept refusing, which, with the background of de Lava as a prostitute, forfeited the credibility that Thomson thought would save him.

== Family ==
Thomson had three children:

- Enid Zaina Thomson
- Lieutenant-Colonel Vivian Home Seymer, DSO, MC (17 October 1894 – 7 January 1967), born Vivian Home Thomson, whose name was legally changed by royal licence on 3 November 1919.
- Amherst Felix Basil Home Thomson (1911–?)

== Footnotes ==
Police appointments
Preceded by Sir Melville Macnaghten	Assistant Commissioner "C", Metropolitan Police; 1913–1921	Succeeded by Sir Wyndham Childs
