= John Wallinger =

British Indian intelligence officer

Major Sir John Arnold Wallinger KBE CIE DSO KPM
- Born: John Arnold Wallinger; 25 October 1869; Poona, British India
- Died: 7 January 1931 (aged 71); Brighton, England
- Occupations: Imperial policeman Counter-intelligence officer
- Awards: Knight Commander of the Order of the British Empire; Companion of the Order of the Indian Empire; Distinguished Service Order; King's Police Medal
- Espionage activity
- Allegiance: United Kingdom; British India
- Service branch: Indian Imperial Police; Metropolitan Police; Indian Political Intelligence Office; British Army
- Service years: 1896–1926
- Rank: Superintendent; Major (temporary); Deputy Inspector General of Police
- Operations: World War I Hindu-German Conspiracy

Major Sir John Arnold Wallinger KBE, DSO, CIE, KPM (25 October 1869 – 7 January 1931) was a British Indian intelligence officer who led the Indian Political Intelligence Office from 1909 to 1916. As a colonial policeman and counter-intelligence officer he became a specialist in countering those opposed to British rule in India, operating both in India and in England.

During the First World War he was engaged in combating the Hindu–German Conspiracy. During this period he employed the novelist W. Somerset Maugham as an intelligence agent in Geneva. Wallinger is perhaps best known as the principal inspiration for the character of "R.", the fictional British spymaster who employs Ashenden in Maugham's stories.

== Early life ==
Wallinger was born on 25 October 1869 at Poona, British India. His father was William H. Arnold Wallinger, a British official in the Indian Civil Service with the Imperial Forestry Service. In 1896, he joined the Indian Imperial Police in Ahmadabad as an inspector.

== Intelligence career ==
In 1902, during a period of concern over the activities of Indian nationalist political activists, Wallinger was seconded to the Metropolitan Police at Scotland Yard. This was the first of his activities in countering Indian anti-colonial activists in Europe, before returning to India in 1904. He gained a reputation in intelligence circles as "a brave officer with a talent for acquiring local native dialects and a flair for undercover criminal intelligence operations when he would ‘black up’".

In 1910 he returned to England with the rank of superintendent to lead the newly-established Indian Political Intelligence Office. This was a substantial organisation and role, reflecting the concerns the British government had regarding anti-colonial political activists, described by historian Richard Popplewell as "not much smaller than the European intelligence operations of the Secret Service Bureau, let alone those of the War Office". He was awarded the King's Police Medal in the 1914 New Year Honours.

During the First World War he was given the temporary rank of Major in the British Army, his commission listed as "Special List (General Staff Officer)". Wallinger was attached to general headquarters in France, where he operated in a counter-intelligence capacity against the Berlin Committee and the Hindu–German Conspiracy. Here he also worked alongside his younger brother Ernest, a major in the Intelligence Corps who had lost his foot at the Battle of Le Cateau serving in the Royal Field Artillery. In August 1916, Wallinger returned to intelligence work in India. After the war in 1919 he was posted to Egypt, and the following year he was appointed deputy inspector-general of the Indian Imperial Police.

He was highly decorated for his intelligence work: on 14 January 1916 he was awarded the Distinguished Service Order, and in the 1918 New Year Honours he was made a Companion of the Order of the Indian Empire. After the war, on 3 June 1925, he was awarded a KBE. In 1926 he was offered the role of deputy commissioner of the Metropolitan Police, but instead chose to retire to Brighton on the south coast of England, where he died on 7 January 1931.

== Literary and cultural influence ==
Among Wallinger's more famous agents was Somerset Maugham, whom he recruited in London and sent as a secret agent to Switzerland. Wallinger was the literary prototype of the spymaster of a number of Maugham's short stories, and was notably portrayed as the spymaster "R." in the Ashenden stories Maugham wrote following the war.

Inspired by Maugham's stories, the character of "R." based on Wallinger was played by Charles Carson in the 1936 Alfred Hitchcock espionage thriller Secret Agent.
