= Fyodor Shcherbatskoy =

Russian academic and Indologist (1866–1942)

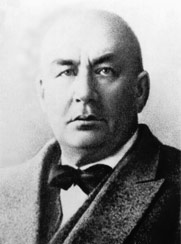
Fyodor Stcherbatskoy

Fyodor Ippolitovich Shcherbatskoy or Stcherbatsky (Russian: Фёдор Ипполи́тович Щербатско́й; 11 September (N.S.) 1866 – 18 March 1942), often referred to in the literature as F. Th. Stcherbatsky, was a Russian Indologist who, in large part, was responsible for laying the foundations in the Western world for the scholarly study of Buddhism and Buddhist philosophy. He was born in Kielce, Congress Poland, and died at the Borovoye Resort, in what is now northern Kazakhstan.

Stcherbatsky studied in the famous Tsarskoye Selo Lyceum (graduating in 1884), and later in the Historico-Philological Faculty of Saint Petersburg University (graduating in 1889), where Ivan Minayeff and Serge Oldenburg were his teachers. Subsequently, sent abroad, he studied Indian poetry with Georg Bühler in Vienna, and Buddhist philosophy with Hermann Jacobi in Bonn. In 1897, he and Oldenburg inaugurated Bibliotheca Buddhica, a library of rare Buddhist texts.

Returning from a trip to India and Mongolia, in 1903 Stcherbatsky published (in Russian) the first volume of Theory of Knowledge and Logic of the Doctrine of Later Buddhists (2 vols., St. Petersburg, 1903–1909). In 1928 he established the Institute of Buddhist Culture in Leningrad. His The Conception of Buddhist Nirvana (Leningrad, 1927), written in English, caused a sensation in the West. He followed suit with his main work in English, Buddhist Logic (2 vols., 1930–32), which has exerted an immense influence on Buddhology.

Although Stcherbatsky remained less well known in his own country, his extraordinary fluency in Sanskrit and Tibetan languages won him the admiration of Jawaharlal Nehru and Rabindranath Tagore. According to Debiprasad Chattopadhyaya, "Stcherbatsky did help us – the Indians – to discover our own past and to restore the right perspective of our own philosophical heritage." The Encyclopædia Britannica (2004 edition) acclaimed Stcherbatsky as "the foremost Western authority on Buddhist philosophy".

== See also ==
- Buddhist logico-epistemology
- Buddhist atomism and Mindstream

== Bibliography ==
- Bapat, P. V. (1943), Fedore Ippolitorich Stcherbatsky, Annals of the Bhandarkar Oriental Research Institute 24 (3/4), 284–285 (registration required)
- Ruegg, D. Seyfort (1971), Dedication to Th. Stcherbatsky, Journal of Indian Philosophy 1 (3), 213–216 (registration required)
