= People's Commissariat for Foreign Affairs =

Soviet foreign affairs government body

The People's Commissariat of Foreign Affairs (NKID or the People's Commissariat of Foreign Affairs) was the state body of the People's Commissariat for Foreign Affairs of the USSR and the Soviet Union responsible for conducting the foreign policy of the Soviet state in 1917–1946:

- People's Commissariat for Foreign Affairs of the Russian SFSR (1917–1923)
- People's Commissariat for Foreign Affairs of the USSR (1923–1946)

The Ministry of Foreign Affairs took over the role of managing external relationships for the Soviet Union from 1946.
