= Indian Political Intelligence Office =

The Indian Political Intelligence Office (IPIO) was an intelligence organisation initially established in England in 1909 in response to the dissemination of anarchist and revolutionary elements of Indian nationalism to different countries in Europe after the liquidation of India House (where it was based between 1905 and 1910) in London in 1909. It formally came to be called the Indian Political Intelligence (IPI) from 1921.

By the time World War I broke out the IPIO, headed by John Wallinger, had been established in mainland Europe. In scale, this office was larger than those operated by the British War Office, approaching the size of the European intelligence network of the Secret Service Bureau. This network already had agents in Switzerland against possible German intrigues. After the outbreak of the war, Wallinger, under the cover of an officer of the British General Headquarters, proceeded to France where he operated out of Paris, working with the French Political Police, the Sûreté.
