= S. R. Rana =

Indian political activist (1870–1957)

Sardarsinhji Rana
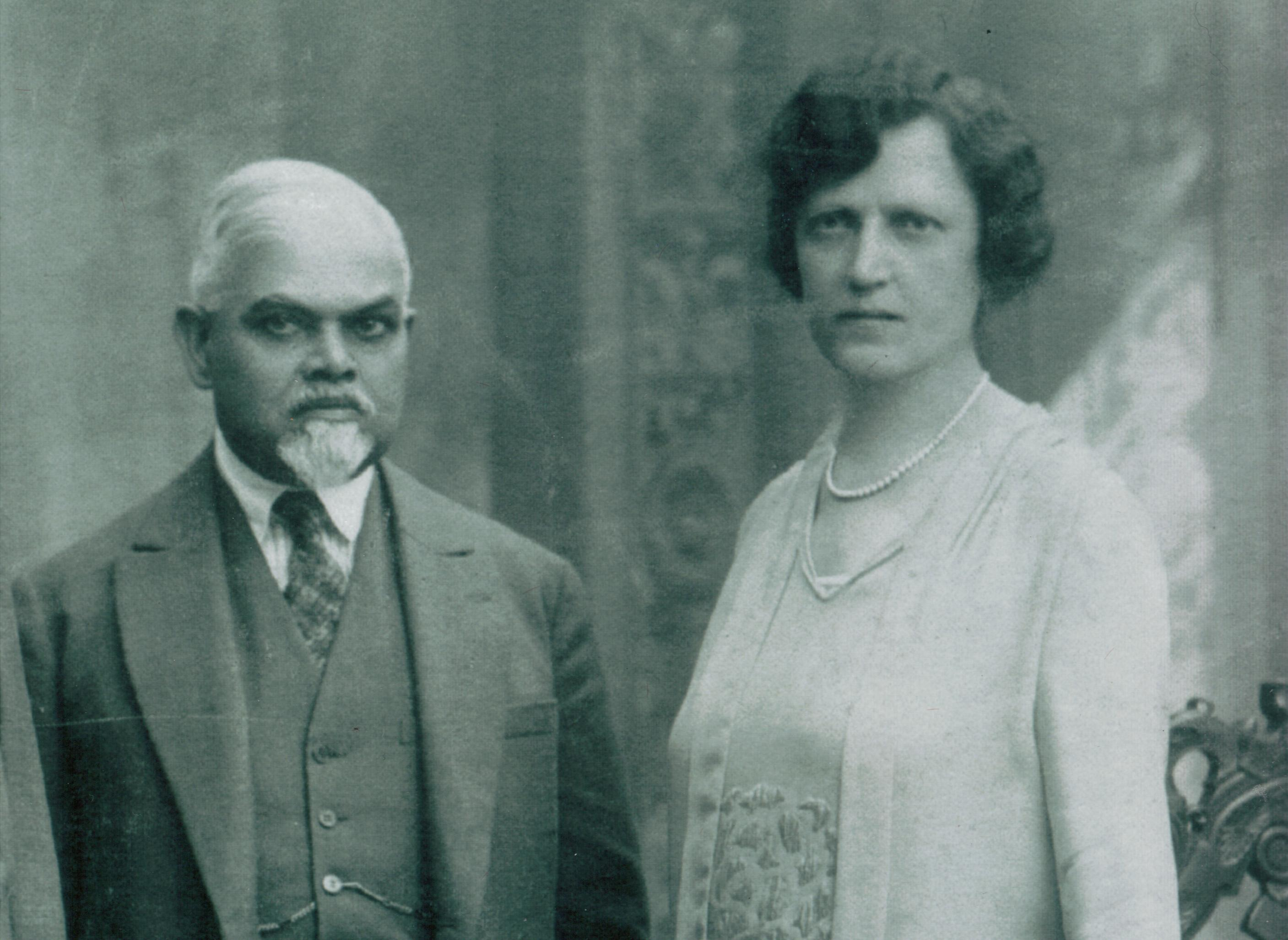
- S. R. Rana with his German wife
- Born: 10 April 1870; Kanthariya village, Limbdi State, British India
- Died: 25 May 1957; Veraval, Bombay State (now Gujarat), India
- Education: Barrister
- Alma mater: Alfred High School, Rajkot; Elphinstone College, University of Bombay; Fergusson College, Pune
- Occupations: Indian Revolutionary, lawyer, journalist, writer, jeweller
- Organization(s): The Indian Home Rule Society, India House, Paris Indian Society
- Known for: Indian Independence Movement
- Spouse(s): Sonba Recy (m. 1904; died 1931)
- Children: Rajendrasinh Rana(Grandchild)
- Parent(s): Ravaji II, Fulajiba
- Website: sardarsinhrana.com

Sardarsinhji Ravaji Rana (1870–1957), often abbreviated S. R. Rana, was an Indian independence activist, founding member of the Paris Indian Society and the vice-president of the Indian Home Rule Society.

== Biography ==
Sardarsinhji Rana was born on 10 April 1870 (Chaitra Sud 9 according to Hindu calendar) in Kanthariya village in Kathiawar to a Rajput family of Ravaji II and Fulajiba. He studied at Dhuli School and later joined Alfred High School, Rajkot where he was classmate of Mohandas Gandhi. After completing his matriculation in 1891, he studied at Elphinstone College, graduating with a baccalaureate from Bombay University in 1898. He also studied in Fergusson College, Pune where he came in contact with Lokmanya Tilak and Surendranath Banerjee. He was influenced to join home rule movement as he volunteered at Indian National Congress Conference in Pune in 1895. After completing his studies, he went to London to study Barrister degree. There he came contact with Shyamji Krishna Varma and Bhikhaji Cama. He was instrumental in establishment of India House in London. He married Sonba from Bhingada village during his early life and had two sons, Ranjitsinh and Natwarsinh.

In 1899, Rana left for Paris after taking his examination of Barrister. He served as a translator to Jivanchand Uttamchand, a jeweller from Cambay who was in Paris for World Trade Show. He became an expert and began a jewellery business trading in pearls. He resided at 56, Rue La Fayette street in Paris. It was at this time that Rana came to associate with Indian nationalist politicians, including Lala Lajpat Rai who is known to have visited Paris and stayed with the Rana. In 1905, Rana became one of the founding-members of the Indian Home Rule Society, of which he was the vice president. Together with Munchershah Burjorji Godrej and Bhikaji Cama, he founded the Paris Indian Society that same year as an extension of the Indian Home Rule Society on the European continent. As Shyamji Krishna Varma did also, Rana announced three scholarships for Indian students, each worth Rs 2,000 in memory of Maharana Pratap, Chhatrapati Shivaji and Akbar in December, 1905 issue of The Indian Sociologist. He had announced several other scholarships and travel fellowships.

He helped Indian independence movement in several ways. Madan Lal Dhingra had used his pistol to assassinate Curzon Wyllie in 1909. He had helped Vinayak Damodar Savarkar to publish his banned book, The Indian War of Independence. He had also helped Hemchandra Kanungo, both financially and also to learn the art of bomb manufacturing during his stay at Paris. He had also helped him in his Marseille asylum case in Permanent Court of Arbitration, The Hague in 1910. Lala Lajpat Rai had written Unhappy India during his stay in his house for five years. He had helped Senapati Bapat and Hemchandra Kanungo to travel to study making of bombs in Moscow. He had helped Subhash Chandra Bose to address audience on German radio. He had also helped in establishment of Banaras Hindu University.

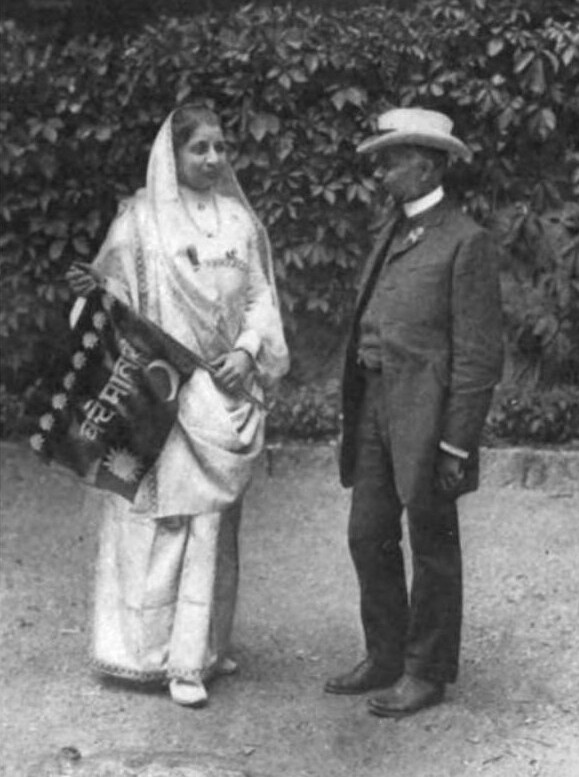
Madam Cama and S. R. Rana, 1907

Together with Cama he came to develop close links with the French and Russian Socialist movements and with her attended the second Socialist Congress at Stuttgart on 18 August 1907 where the "Flag of Indian Independence" was presented by Cama. From then on, he was a regular contributor to Bande Mataram (published by Cama from Paris) and The Talvar (from Berlin), which were then smuggled into India.

The years immediately prior to World War I were however the turning point for Rana's personal and political life. In Paris, he is known to have lived with a German woman known as Recy who – although she was not married to him – came to be known as Mrs. Rana. They married in 1904 when his first wife told to do so. His both sons moved to Paris to stay with him. Along with his dying son Ranjitsinh and his German wife, he was expelled by the French Government to Martinique in 1911. The activities of the Paris Indian Society were curtailed under pressure from the French Sûreté, and finally suspended in 1914. His son Ranjitsinh died in 1914. His wife was also refused permission to enter France for a cancer operation. He returned to France in 1920. His German wife died of cancer in 1931. He had visited India in 1947 to perform bone immersion rites of his son Ranjitsinh at Haridwar. He returned on 23 April 1948. He wrapped up his business and moved back to India in 1955 when he had failing health. Later he had a stroke also. He died on 25 May 1957 at the Circuit House of Veraval (now in Gujarat).

== Legacy and recognition ==
He was awarded the Chevalier by the French Government in 1951. His portraits are placed in the Gujarat Legislative Assembly and his place of death in Veraval.

His great grandson Rajendrasinh Rana served as the Member of Parliament from 1996 to 2014 representing Bhavnagar.

== Bibliography ==
- Kanani, Amin (1990), Lajpat Rai. Swaraj and Social Change., Deep and Deep Publications.
- Chopra, Pran Nath; Chopra, Prabha (1988), Indian Freedom Fighters Abroad: Secret British Intelligence Report, Criterion Publications..
- Gupta, Manmath Nath (1972), History of the Indian revolutionary movement., Somaiya Publications.
- Phatak, N. R (1958), Source Material for a History of the Freedom Movement in India., Govt Central Press.
- Popplewell, Richard J (1995), Intelligence and Imperial Defence: British Intelligence and the Defence of the Indian Empire 1904–1924., London: Routledge, ISBN 0-7146-4580-X.
- Radhan, O.P (2002), Encyclopaedia of Political Parties, New Delhi: Anmol, ISBN 81-7488-865-9.
- Sareen, Tilak Raj (1979), Indian Revolutionary Movement Abroad, 1905-1921., New Delhi: Sterling.
- Sen, S.N. (1997), History of the Freedom Movement in India (1857-1947), New Delhi: South Asia Books, ISBN 81-224-1049-9.
