= M. P. T. Acharya =

Indian nationalist, communist and then anarchist (1887–1954)

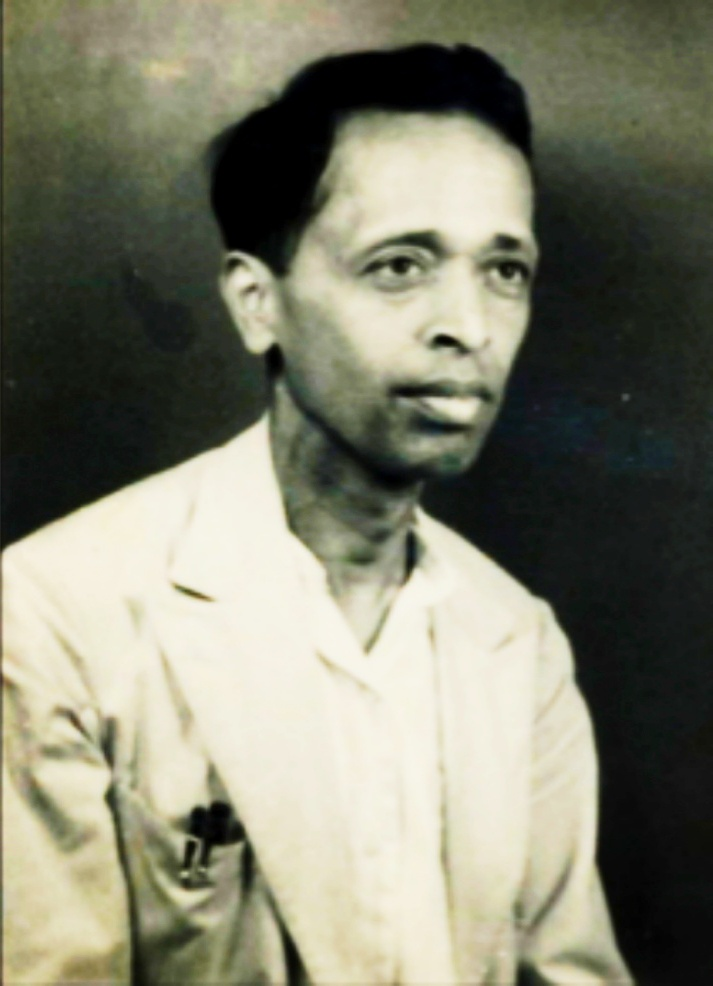
- Born: April 15, 1887; Madras, Madras Presidency, British India (now Chennai, Tamil Nadu, India)
- Died: March 20, 1954 (aged 66); Bombay, Bombay State (now Mumbai, Maharashtra, India)
- Other names: M. P. B. T. Acharya
- Organization(s): India House, Paris Indian Society, Berlin Committee, Communist Party of India, League against imperialism.
- Movement: Indian independence movement, Hindu-German Conspiracy, Communism, Anarchism
- Spouse: Magda Nachman Acharya

Mandayam Parthasarathi Tirumal Acharya (April 15, 1887 – March 20, 1954) was an Indian nationalist, communist and then anarchist who was among the founding members of the Communist Party of India (Tashkent group). Born to an Aiyangar brahmin family, Indian nationalism was part of his upbringing. Under threat of persecution, he left for Europe and became associated with London's India House and worked with V. D. Savarkar. He attempted to train as a revolutionary in the 1909 Second Melillan campaign and in Paris, where he became involved in the socialist movement. As a key functionary of the Berlin Committee in the World War I Hindu-German Conspiracy, Acharya attempted to rally German support for Indian revolutionaries. After the war, Acharya moved to the Soviet Union and helped found the Communist Party of India at Tashkent. Disappointed with the Communist International, he left for Europe, worked with the League against Imperialism, and developed anarcho-syndicalist views. After his ban was lifted in 1935, Acharya returned to India, where he worked as a journalist.

== Early life ==
M.P.T. Acharya was born on 15 April 1887 in Madras to a family of Aiyangar brahmins. His father, M.P. Narasimha Aiyangar, was an employee in the Madras Public Works Department whose family had originally migrated from the state of Mysore. Young M.P.T. was exposed to nationalism from childhood, with his family playing a prominent role in the rise of Indian nationalism in South India. His close relatives included M.C. Alasinga Perumal, one of the co-founders of the Brahmavadin journal, as well as Prof. Rangachari of Madras Presidency College. Acharya himself was an admirer of Swami Vivekananda in his childhood.

By 1900, a young Acharya, along with Subramanya Bharathi, had begun publication of the weekly journal called India, and worked hard to popularise the publication within a short time. However, the journal's nationalist editorials and critical and satirical cartoons quickly drew the attention of The Raj, forcing the young editors to quietly shift to the French enclave of Pondicherry, following the trail of notable numbers who migrated to the enclave as refugees. The publication also acquired popularity in Pondicherry.

Work of the press continued unabated for M.P.T. Acharya, and was expanded to publications of revolutionary literature. The British government began to seek French assistance to ban the publications which were deemed "seditious literature". Under pressure from British colonial authorities, the French authorities in Pondicherry relented, allowing the Indian Imperial Police to establish surveillance centres to monitor the activities of the revolutionaries. Attempts were also made at this time to extradite the Indians to British custody. Subramania Bharaty, along with S.N.T. Acharya (owner of the India magazine) and the latter's cousin, were forced to flee to Europe.

Although some French officials did indeed harbour sympathies for the Indian revolutionaries, the latter also faced some resistance among the local Francophile and Europeanised Indians who saw the "new immigrants" somewhat contemptuously. The refugee cause was, however, taken up by a number of sympathetic French lawyers. Acharya found assistance from this group to help fight against his expulsion from Pondicherry.

== England ==
Faced with the threat of persecution, M.P.T. Acharya made up his mind to leave India. He left for Britain. Acharya visited his ailing father at Shiyali and, although an orthodox Brahmin, shaved off his long hair (Juttoo). At this time, Acharya was still unable to decide whether he wished to move to somewhere in Asia or to Europe, finally deciding to head for Colombo, a city he had visited earlier. His savings was a sum of three hundred Rupees, which allowed him money for travel but not any luggage.

From Colombo, Acharya proceeded to Marseille, for which he was able to acquire a third class ticket for eleven pounds, nearly half his savings. It is said that during the voyage to Marseille, as an orthodox Brahmin he was unable to bring himself to eat non-Indian food – he was forbidden from taking even coffee or bread by his orthodox beliefs – and decided to observe a fast for the twenty-two days the voyage lasted.

From Marseille, short of money, Acharya proceeded to Paris where he hoped to find Indian expatriates who might have been able to help him both financially and with jobs. He had, while editing Anglo-Tamil newspaper and journals in India, been in touch with Indians living in France and in Paris. In Paris, he established contact with Professor Moniers Vinson and a few Indian expatriates. He was able to support himself with help from this circle for some time. In his reminiscences, Acharya mentions an unnamed Parisian Indian acquaintance who, having invited him home one afternoon and being told by a penniless Acharya that he would have to walk to his house, handed him the money for his train fare.

=== India House ===
While in Paris, urged by his friends, Acharya wrote to V.V.S. Iyer, an Indian barrister originally from Truchi who practiced in London. Iyer was actively involved with the India House, which was established in London in 1905 ostensibly to support Indian students and offer scholarships. India House was also a fertile ground for the exchange of nationalist opinions among students. It promoted nationalistic work and had the support of notable Indian nationalists such as Dadabhai Naoroji, Lala Lajpat Rai and Madame Bhikaji Cama. Iyer responded promptly, inviting Acharya to London. It was here in London that Acharya was introduced to the nationalism of India House.

In London, the India House settled Acharya's short-term worries of food and shelter. With financial support from the organisation, Acharya was able to enroll to learn photoengraving at the trade school of the London County Council. However, India House, by this time, was considered "The most dangerous organisation outside India" and had attracted enough attention for its nationalist opinions to be discussed in the British Parliament. Prominent London newspapers including The Times demanded that Shyamji Krishna Varma, the founder of India House, be prosecuted for preaching "disloyal sentiments" to Indian students. By September 1907, The Indian Sociologist, published by the India House, was deemed "seditious literature" and was banned in India. It was at India House that Acharya was introduced to V.D. Savarkar.

Acharya was quick to realise that the residents of India House were shadowed by detectives from Scotland Yard. A fear of repercussions due to an association with India House built an invisible barrier that prevented other Indian students from visiting or receiving residents of the house. This careerist and self-critical attitude of his fellow Indians, compared to the polite and helpful nature of Englishmen, is believed to have disappointed Acharya deeply. At one point, Acharya described Indian students treating the India House as a "Leper's Home".

=== With Savarkar ===
Through his prolonged stay in India House, however, Acharya gradually became deeply involved in its activities. Scotland Yard had at one point been able to infiltrate the organisation with an Indian student by the name of Kritikar, who had arrived at the organisation with a story similar to that of Acharya, and had for some time been able to report to Scotland Yard about its activities before he was uncovered and forced by Savarkar to confess at gunpoint. After this, Kirtikar's reports are believed to have been regularly screened by Savarkar before they were passed on to Scotland Yard. For some time, Acharya himself had been under suspicion of being a Scotland Yard mole before he was able to convince his fellow residents of his integrity and commitment to the nationalist cause. It is believed that Acharya was instructed by V.V.S. Iyer and V.D. Savarkar to set himself up as an informer to Scotland Yard, which they reasoned would allow them to carefully feed information to the police and also help them provide a corroboration to the version of reports that were being sent by Kritikar. For his reports, Acharya took five pounds (later doubled) which also eased from his fellow house-mates the financial strain of supporting him.

V.D. Savarkar had by this time developed a reputation of an avid orator and a staunch nationalist. In London, Savarkar researched through the India Office library and archives. Even those who did not dare attend the Sunday night meetings at the India House were of the opinion that he was an erudite orator and a learned scholar.

Acharya became deeply involved in the activities of the house, working with Savarkar and others in the house to produce nationalist pamphlets and publications including The Indian Sociologist, Bande Mataram and Talvar, which called for India's freedom and voiced what at the time were seen as "inflammatory and seditious" nationalist sentiments. The celebrations in Britain marking the 50th anniversary of the Indian Rebellion of 1847 were met by India House with the publication of a nationalist history of the revolt, The Indian War of Independence, penned by Savarkar with records from the India Office archives. The project received support from Indian nationalists in Britain including the likes of Madame Cama, Iyer, as well as Indian students who had dare not show their support or sympathy for India House openly. Publishers in Britain refused to publish the book, which was ultimately published from the Netherlands. The book was rejected for publication from publishers. Acharya was, with a number of other residents of the India House, involved in raising funds, organising and in other ways helped with the project. Clandestinely, the residents also trained for organising revolutions in India. Acharya, along with Madan Lal Dhingra, V.V.S. Iyer and others, practiced shooting at a range in Tottenham Court Road and acquired considerable skills with the revolver.

=== End of India House ===
By 1909, India House was under strong surveillance from Scotland Yard. Savarkar's elder brother Ganesh Savarkar was arrested in India in June that year, and was subsequently tried and transported for life for publication of seditious literature. Savarkar's speeches grew increasingly virulent and called for revolution, widespread violence, and murder of all Englishmen in India. The culmination of these events was the assassination of William Hutt Curzon Wyllie, the political ADC to the Secretary of State for India, by Madanlal Dhingra on the evening of 1 July 1909 at a meeting of Indian students in the Imperial Institute in London. Dhingra was arrested and later tried and executed. In the aftermath of the assassination, the India House was rapidly liquidated. The investigations in the aftermath of the assassination were expanded to look for broader conspiracies originating from the India house, and Scotland Yard brought pressure on the inmates to leave England. While some of its leaders, like Krishna Varma, fled to Europe, others like Chattopadhyaya, moved to Germany and many others moved to Paris. It was suggested to Acharya at this time by one Syed Hyder Reza, probably on instructions from Scotland Yard, that Acharya move to the United States.

However, Acharya remained in London for sometime, lodging at Bipin Pal's boarding house. He attended along with Savarkar, Iyer and other ex-residents of the house a meeting of Indians called by the Aga Khan to demonstrate their loyalty to the empire and offer condolences to the Wyllie family, where they opposed the unanimous acceptance of a resolution of condemnation against Dhingra. In a scuffle that ensued between Savarkar and a London barrister by the name of Palmer, Acharya is known to have come to Savarkar's aid, hitting Palmer with a stick and apparently not shooting Palmer with his revolver only under indications from Savarkar not to do so.

Interviewed repeatedly in the investigations following the Wyillie murder, it became clear to Acharya that staying in Britain was not safe for him. Neither could he return to India, for he was sure to be picked up by Indian police. He did not wish to waste the experiences he had gained studying and training for revolution at the India House. He also wanted first-hand experiences of the battlefield. Indian revolutionaries in Europe at this time used to send recruits to work with Irish, Egyptian and Turkish groups for training and experience.

Acharya's attention was turned towards the Spanish-Moroccan war, where he believed the Rifian people fighting the white imperialist Spain would welcome him and allow exposure to guerrilla warfare. After consulting with V.V.S. Iyer, Acharya and another Indian revolutionary by the name of Sukhsagar Dutt were selected to be sent to train with the Rifians. Guns, uniforms and funds were obtained by the remnants of the India House, and the two were given a hearty farewell from Savarkar and Iyer.

The Moroccan mission was, however, a dismal failure. Neither the Rifians nor the Spanish troops were willing to recruit the two Indians for suspicion of being spies from the opposing camp. Penniless and emaciated, Dutt and Acharya were left with no option but to leave the country. Writing to London, Acharya asked for help to be moved to a different country, and if possible, to India. The two were sent enough money to reach Portugal, where they were instructed to meet an Indian contact. Dutt returned to London, later joining the Paris Indian Society. Acharya, meanwhile, proceeded to Lisbon. He had wished to settle in Portugal, but the terms of residency offered by Portuguese Interior affairs minister instructed him to place himself under police supervision, not change residences without police permission and a number of other conditions which to Acharya meant he could not live as a free man. Broke and depressed, Acharya returned to London. The whole affair had cost nearly three hundred pounds.

== Europe ==
A large number of Indian nationalists had (as explained above) moved to Europe in the aftermath of Curzon Wyllie's assassination. Among them were Shyamji Krishna Varma, Virendranath Chattopadhyaya, Har Dayal, Bhikhaji Cama. Madame Cama founded the Bande Mataram in Paris in September 1909. From Paris, Madame Cama arranged for Indian students to be supported in Russia, Germany, Japan and other countries where they could train in explosives, military tactics, arrange for arms shipments to India and also facilitate continental connections.

After Savarkar's arrest in 1910 Acharya and V.V.S. Iyer took the prudent decision of leaving for Paris, where Acharya worked for Madame Cama's publication. He continued to maintain contacts with revolutionaries in India, including Subramanya Bharathi with whom he had worked in Pondicherry, and with M.S. Acharya. Significantly, at this time, in addition to his works in promoting and clandestine distribution of the Bande Mataram, Acharya, in a train of thought that arose among Indian revolutionaries at this time, began efforts to spread nationalist sentiments amongst the British Indian Army. The influx of seditious literature from Europe was quickly noted by the British colonial authorities. A report by the Director of Criminal intelligence bureau described the effects and sentiments that these literature were promoting amongst the "ignorant peasantry", urging the ban on such publications emanating in Europe from entering India. The result was the Indian Press Act, 1910 which restricted publication of sedtious material in India and the entry of such literature from outside. A number of newspaper proprietors, journalists and editors within India were imported or transported under the act. The publication found their way in nonetheless. Among Acharya's ploys was to send these literature from different countries and use different secret code numbers to prevent Indian postal authorities from deciphering or tracing them.

=== Socialism ===
It was also in Paris that Acharya's thoughts were first turned towards socialism. This was similar to the lines of thought that appeared in the Indian revolutionary circles in Europe, especially in France, at this time. He was introduced to the Socialist circle in Paris in 1910, and enjoyed the congenial atmosphere and the thoughts and ideas that he shared. It was also with the help of the Paris Socialist circle, notably Jean Longuet, that the Paris Indian Society- which included Acharya, Har Dayal, Madam Cama and other notable names- brought pressure on the French Government when Savarkar was rearrested at Marseille after escaping from a ship that was deporting him to India. Acharya made the most of the available press freedom and the socialist platform to press for the re-extradition of his erstwhile leader to France and build French public opinion in support of such moves. Under public pressure at home, the French Government conceded to make such a request to Britain. The matter was ultimately settled in the Permanent Court of Arbitration at the Hague, which ruled in favour of Britain. Acharya became extensively involved in the socialist movement. The Paris Indian Society at this time grew to be one of the most powerful Indian organisations outside India at the time, and grew to initiate contacts with not only French Socialists, but also those in continental Europe. It sent delegates at this time to the International Socialist Congress in August 1910, where Shyamji Krishna Varma and V.V.S. Iyer succeeded in having a resolution passed demanding Savarkar's release and his extradition to France. It also succeeded in bringing to the attention of the organisation the state of affairs in India.

In Paris, the Indian Society also held regular meetings and sought to train its members in skills necessary for revolution, which included training in firearms, learning military tactics, as well as organising the publication of revolutionary literature. It also sent recruits other countries and, after training, some were sent back to India to carry on propaganda work Acharya himself at this time learnt printing and engraving, and after sometime, was sent to Berlin along with V.V.S Iyer, where they were met by Champakaraman Pillai, who headed and Indian revolutionary group there. Observing Pillai's work, Acharya and Iyer suggested to the Paris Indian Society that their work by expanded beyond the work of the Paris publication. Accordingly, with funds from Madam Cama, Virendranath Chattopadhyaya was sent to Berlin to begin publication of the Talvar. The National fund scheme was initiated of which Madam Cama was the biggest contributor with (then) 5,000 Francs. The funds were strictly regulated to fund revolutionary activities in India, as well as fund Savarkar's trial.

=== First World War ===
In the meantime, work on Bande Mataram and other publications continued unabated. These were shipped by Acharya to India through contacts in Pondicherry, and at times under false covers including those of The Pickwick Papers. V.V.S. Iyer later returned to India, where he began training the Indian underground movement on explosives and bombs. On 17 June 1911, a young Indian revolutionary by the name of Vanchi Iyer fatally shot Robert D'escourt Ashe at Tirunelveli. Ashe had been a district collector who had earned notoriety for himself for his role in suppression of nationalist agitation and Swadeshi movement in 1908. Vanchi himself had learnt to shoot from Iyer in Pondicherry. The 1918 sedition committee report blamed Acharya for instigating, organising and planning the assassination.

In 1911, Acharya arrived in Istanbul on the Paris Indian society's directions to seek Turkish help for Indian movement. Turkey and Persia had already been a centre for revolutionary activities by groups led by Sardar Ajit Singh and Sufi Amba Prasad who had worked there since 1909. The recruits to these groups included young nationalists of the likes of Rhishikesh Letha, Zia-ul-Haq, and Thakur Das. By 1910, the activities of these groups and their publication, the Hayat, had been noticed by British intelligence. Reports as early as 1910 indicated German efforts to unite Turkey and Persia and proceed to Afghanistan to threaten British India. However, Ajit Singh's departure in 1911 brought the Indian revolutionary activities to a grinding halt, while British representations to Persia successfully curbed whatever activity that remained in the country. In this situation, Acharya's mission was without much success. A similar effort by Barkatullah a year later also would experience a similar fate.

With the beginning of the war, the Indian efforts began in earnest to subverting the sepoys of the British Indian Army and to fund and arm a revolution in India in a massive conspiracy that spanned the globe. The German intelligence agency for the East was formed at this time and actively sought to destabilize British possessions in India and the Middle East. In this, they allied with the Indian revolutionaries and also sought Har Dayal's aid. At the time that the First World War broke out, Acharya had reached Berlin and was one of the founding members of the Berlin Committee that reorganised the liaison's and terms of German help for revolution in India, which had initially faltered on account of differences between Har Dayal and German Foreign office. Following Har Dayal's work United States promoting nationalist sentiments in Indian groups in North America before his deportation to Switzerland in 1913, as well as from the links of the committee members with other revolutionary groups around the globe, the Berlin committee had strong links with Indian revolutionary groups in India, Europe, Far-east as well as nationalist groups in the US and Canada, most notably the Ghadar Party. It sent members including Herambalal Gupta and Chandra Kanta Chakraverty to the United States to begin arrangements for arms shipment (which culminated in the Annie Larsen fiasco). Acharya himself sought to focus on organising recruits for the intended revolution. A prime target was Turkey, which had a substantial Indian presence, both Hajj pilgrims and as Indian residents.

With the efforts of the Berlin Committee and the Paris Indian Society, Har Dayal reached Istanbul following another Indian revolutionary by the name of P.N. Dutta. In Istanbul, Har Dayal was joined by Pandurang Khankoje. However, Har Dayal's efforts were short-lived due to his apprehensions of Turkish Pan-Islamic ambitions and interference from the German Foreign office. In 1915, Acharya had reached Istanbul on the committee's initiative. Here, Har Dayal had begun work earlier but left due to apprehensions on the issues of conflict of Hindu and Muslim interests, Turkey's pan-Islamic ambitions and interference from the German foreign office. The Berlin committee reorganised and negotiated the terms of their liaison, and after assurances from the Germans, rededicated itself to the same task. Acharya's efforts were directed at forming the Indian National Volunteer Corps with the help of Indian civilians in Turkey, in addition to recruiting Indian Prisoners of War. He is known to have worked in Bushire amongst Indian troops with Wilhelm Wassmuss, while one story describes Acharya and a fellow revolutionary by the name of Birendranth Dasgupta as having swum across the Suez Canal at one point to contact troops of the British Indian Army.

== Communism ==
Acharya later returned to Berlin and over the course of the war, was in Stockholm briefly along with Virendranath Chattopadhyaya. In Stockholm in May 1917, Acharya and Chattopadhyaya formed a Propaganda Bureau and later joined by Har Dayal. This bureau worked independently of the Berlin Committee and the German foreign office. The duo are known to have met with the Bolshevik ideologist Konstantin Mikhalilovich Troyanovsky at this time and explained the Indian situation, winning approval from the latter for the Indian cause. The Paris Indian society had been in touch with Russian communists before the Russian revolution. Nicholas Safransky, a Russian bomb expert, is known to have been involved in training the Indian revolutionaries in bomb manufacture and explosives. and Acharya was greatly impressed by the revolution itself, hailed at the time as a watershed in the struggle of colonial people against imperialism. The publication of a manifesto by the Soviet Union declaring support for colonies against imperialism was attractive to the Indian nationalists, who saw Soviet Russia as a future centre for coordinating activities, and also intended Russia to be a channel for Indian nationalists in any peace negotiations. This was also the time that the Swedish government under diplomatic pressure from Britain, gradually was leaning on the Indian propaganda bureau, while relationship of the Berlin committee with the German foreign office was also strained on apprehensions of German imperial designs and over allocation of funds. Chatto and Acharya arranged for Troyanovsky to be provided with a large amount of the committee's literature to acquaint the Soviets with the Indian situation when the latter left Stockholm for Petrograd. However, Acharya was ultimately disappointed with the Socialist conference in Stockholm, which in his opinion entirely skirted the issue of the colonies. Towards the end of 1918, Acharya returned to Berlin along with Chatto.

=== Russia ===
At Berlin at the time was also Mahendra Pratap, who had in 1915 travelled to Kabul at the head of a Turco-German-Indian expedition through Persia with the aim to try and rally the Afghan Emir into the war on the Entente side. Although mostly unsuccessful in their aim, the Indian nationalists established in Kabul the Provisional Government of India, as the head of which Pratap attempted to garner support from Soviet Russia through Trotsky and Joffe. In 1918, Pratap was in Berlin, where he was reunited with Acharya and Chatto and the rest of the Berlin committee. In December 1918, Chatto, Acharya and Pratap left for Petrograd, where they worked with Russian Propaganda centre with Troionovsky. Other Indians at this centre at the time included Hussein Shahid Suhrawardy, Abdul Jabbar, Abdul Sattar, Dalip Singh Gill as well as a number of others. In 1918 Acharya moved to Kabul to join Mahendra Pratap's mission to the Emir to declare war against British India. Acharya was a member of Mahendra Pratap's delegation when they met Lenin in Moscow in May 1919.

=== Communist Party of India ===
The time of Acharya's meeting with Lenin in 1919 was also when the war in Europe was coming to an end. The Berlin committee was dissolved and a large number of the Indian revolutionaries were turning towards communism and the Soviet Union. Acharya was one of the key functionaries of the group that included Abdur Rab, Virendranath, Agnes Smedley, C.R. Pillai, Bhupendranath Dutta, Shafiq Ahmad, Amin Faruqui, Nalini Gupta, M.N. Roy. These members were the amongst the first active members and founding fathers of the Indian communism. Abdul Rab and Acharya worked avidly in Soviet Turkestan, founding the Indian revolutionary association. Acharya was constantly on the move between Kabul and Tashkent, and attended the second congress of the Communist International. In October 1920 in Tashkent, Acharya was one of the founding members and a member of the executive of the Communist Party of India (Tashkent group) However, Acharya differed from M.N. Roy, and differences emerged between the two from quite early on. In 1921 a split in the CPI emerged, between factions siding with M.N. Roy, and those who favoured the approaches of Chatto. Acharya was in the latter group. This was the beginning of the end of Acharya's associations with the international Communist movement.

In 1922 Acharya returned to Berlin, working with the Indian independence committee and subsequently with the League against Imperialism. He remained deeply critical of the Communist International, and some have described his political views at the time as anarcho-syndicalist. He remained in Berlin till the early days of Hitler's rise to power, and leaders of the Indian movement who visited Europe at various times, Including Nehru and Subhas Bose, are believed to have met with him. By the early 1920s, Acharya had begun exploring Anarchism. He took an active role in promoting Anarchist works in and was contributed at this time to the Russian Anarchist publication Rabotchi Put. In 1931, he lived in Amsterdam working with the school of Anarcho-syndicalism. Acharya came to be acquainted in early 1930s acquainted with Marxist-leaning Indian industrialist from Bombay, Ranchoddas Bhavan Lotvala. Lotvala had financed The Socialist, one of the first Marxist periodicals in India. Lotvala also financed the translation and publication of many leftist literature including the Communist manifesto.

== Return to India ==
The British-Indian ban on Acharya was lifted in 1935 and he returned to Bombay that same year, where he managed a living as a journalist. During this time, Acharya wrote eight articles which would later be collated to be published as a book called Reminiscences of an Indian revolutionary. From Bombay, Acharya established correspondence with Japanese anarchist Taiji Yamaga and Chinese anarchist Ba Jin. The result of the correspondences led to the three establishing contacts with Commission de Relations de l’Internationale Anarchiste (Liaison Commission of the Anarchist International). In the following years, Acharya contributed to anarchist publications such as Freedom in London, Tierra y Libertad in Mexico and an anarchist publication called Contre Courant in Paris. He also remained in correspondence with Albert Meltzer for more than fifteen years.

In the following years Acharya was appointed secretary of the Indian Institute of Sociology, established under Lotvala's patronage in the 1930s. In later years, Acharya's influence on the institute saw it adopt a number of statutes in 1947 and subsequently the institute adopted the name of Libertarian Socialist Institute. His views on economic matters were profound and in 1951, Free Society Group of Chicago published his work How Long Can Capitalism Survive? in 1951. Acharya also contributed essays and critiques on capitalism, colonialism, communism as well as nationalism to the journal Harijan, commissioned by its editor K.G. Mashruwala, and later M.P. Desai. His contributions to Harijan, accumulating to nearly thirty essays, were his primary source of income before his death in March 1954.

== Personal life ==
Acharya married the artist Magda Nachman in 1921 in Moscow.

== Works ==
- Letter from M.P.T. Acharya to Hem Day (1951) on the South Asian Anarchist Library (SAAL)
