= Paris Indian Society =

Indian nationalist organisation

Based on the Calcutta Flag, design of the "Flag of Indian Independence" raised by Bhikaji Cama of the Paris Indian Society on 22 August 1907, at the International Socialist Conference in Stuttgart, Germany.

The Paris Indian Society was an Indian nationalist organisation founded in 1905 at Paris under the patronage of Madam Bhikaji Rustom Cama, Munchershah Burjorji Godrej and S. R. Rana. The organisation was opened as a branch of the Indian Home Rule Society founded that same year in London under the patronage of Shyamji Krishna Varma.

The Paris Indian Society also saw active participation from Indian nationalists who at various times were associated with the India House during its short existence. This included Virendranath Chattopadhyaya, Har Dayal, M.P.T. Acharya, Hemchandra Kanungo, and Vinayak Damodar Savarkar. Other prominent Indians associated with the society included P.O. Mehta, H.M. Shah, P.C. Varma and a number of other prominent Indians in Paris at the time. The Paris Indian Society, under the strong leadership of Madam Cama, developed close links with the Socialist Party and Russian socialists in exile in Paris, and Cama herself attended the Socialist Congress of the Second International at Stuttgart in 1907, where seconded by Henry Hyndman, she demanded recognition of selfrule for India. It was at this congress that Cama famously unfurled one of the first Flag of India, designed and drawn by fellow member of the organisation Hemchandra Kanungo.

Following the liquidation of the India House in the wake of Curson Wyllie's assassination in 1909 by Madanlal Dhingra, the PIS became the refuge and hub of Indian revolutionaries who fled England. The Paris Indian Society at this time grew to be one of the most powerful Indian organisations outside India at the time, and grew to initiate contacts with not only French Socialists, but also those in continental Europe. It sent delegates at this time to the International Socialist Congress in August 1910. At the time of V.D. Savarkar's rearrest at Marseille following his escape during deportation from England, this socialist network was successfully able to exert pressure on the French government to press for Savarkar's extradition to France before the International Tribunal at The Hague ruled in favour of Britain. In Paris, the Indian Society also held regular meetings and sought to train its members in skills necessary for revolution, which included training in firearms, learning military tactics, as well as organising the publication of revolutionary literature. It also sent recruits other countries and, after training, some were sent back to India to carry on propaganda work The Paris Indian Society produced the Bande Mataram from 1909, and Madam Cama later financed the Talvar to be produced in Berlin.
