= Bhikaiji Cama =

Indian independence activist (1861–1936)

Madam Bhikhaiji Cama
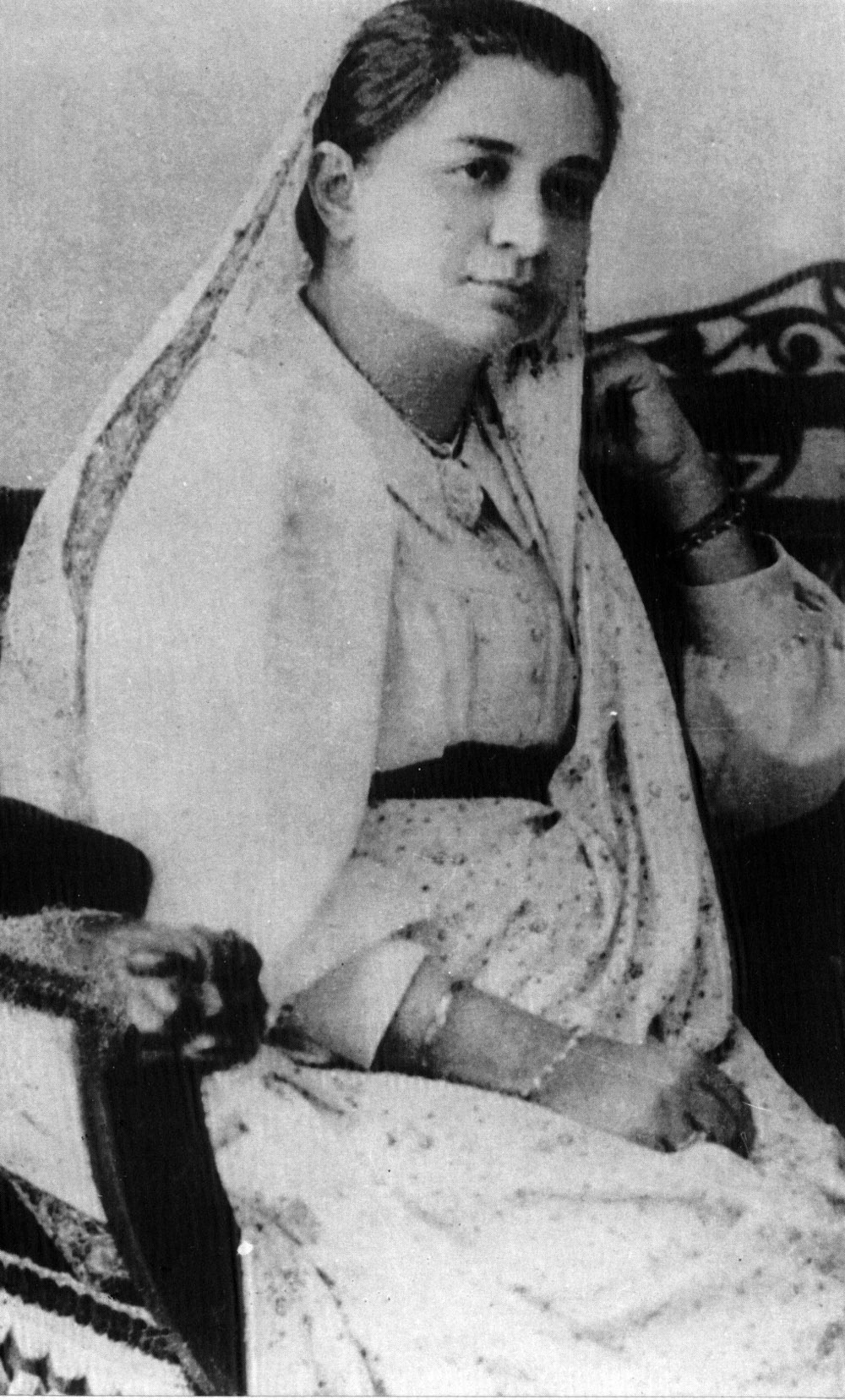
- Born: 24 September 1861; Navsari, Bombay Presidency, British India (present day Gujarat, India)
- Died: 13 August 1936 (aged 74); Bombay, Bombay Presidency, British India (present day Maharashtra, India)
- Organisation(s): India House, Paris Indian Society, Indian National Congress
- Movement: Indian independence movement
- Spouse: Rustom Cama (m. 1885)

Design of the "Flag of Indian Independence" raised by Bhikhaiji Cama on 22 August 1907, at the International Socialist Conference in Stuttgart, Germany. Based on the Calcutta Flag, drawn by Hemchandra Kanungo and Sachindra Prasad Bose, the green, yellow and red fields represent Islam, Hinduism, and Buddhism respectively. The crescent moon and the sun again represent Islam and Hinduism, respectively. The eight lotuses in the upper register represent the eight provinces of British India. The words in the middle are in Devanagri script and read Vande Mataram "[We] Bow to thee Mother [India]", the slogan of the Indian National Congress. The design was adopted in 1914 as the emblem of the Berlin Committee (later known as the Indian Independence Committee). The original "Flag of Indian Independence" raised by Cama in Stuttgart is now on display at the Maratha and Kesari Library in Pune

Bhikhaiji Rustom Cama (Note: Bhikhai- (with aspirated -k^{h}-) is the name as it appears in the biographies. Another common form is Bhikai- (with unaspirated -k-), as it appears on the postage stamp. The name is also frequently misspelled 'Bhikha-' (with missing -i-), which is a male name (unlike the feminine Bhikhai-).) (24 September 1861 – 13 August 1936), also known as Madam Cama, was one of the prominent figures in the Indian independence movement. She unfurled one of the earliest versions of the flag of independent India on August 22, 1907, and she was the first person to hoist an Indian flag in a foreign nation, at the International Socialist Conference at Stuttgart.

== Early life ==
Bhikaiji Cama was born in Bombay (now Mumbai) in a large, affluent Parsi Zoroastrian family. Her parents, Sorabji Framji Patel and Jaijibai Sorabji Patel, were well known in the city, where her father Sorabji—a lawyer by training and a merchant by profession—was an influential member of the Parsi community.

Like many Parsi girls of the time, Bhikhaiji attended Alexandra Girls' English Institution. Bhikhaiji was by all accounts a diligent, disciplined child with a flair for languages. She also excelled at cricket.

On 3 August 1885 at Bombay, she married Rustomji Cama, who was the son of K. R. Cama, and from a loyalist family. Her husband was a wealthy, pro-British lawyer who aspired to enter politics. It was not a compatible or happy marriage, and Bhikhaiji spent most of her time and energy in philanthropic activities and social work.

== Activism ==
In October 1896, the Bombay Presidency was hit first by famine, and shortly thereafter by bubonic plague. Cama joined one of the many teams of nurses working out of Grant Medical College (which would subsequently become Haffkine's plague vaccine research centre), in an effort to provide care for the afflicted, and (later) to inoculate the healthy. Cama subsequently contracted the plague herself but survived. As she was severely weakened, she was sent to Britain for medical care in 1902.

She was preparing to return to India in 1904 when she came in contact with Shyamji Krishna Varma, who was well known in London's Indian community for fiery nationalist speeches he gave in Hyde Park. Through him, she met Dadabhai Naoroji, then president of the British Committee of the Indian National Congress and a strong critic of the British's economic policy in India. She worked as Naoroji's private secretary. She also campaigned with other nationalists such as Bipin Chander Pal, Lala Hardayal and Vinayak Damodar Savarkar.

Together with Naoroji and Singh Rewabhai Rana, Cama supported the founding of Varma's Indian Home Rule Society in February 1905. In London, she was told that her return to India would be prevented unless she refrained from continuing these nationalist activities in India. She refused.

That same year Cama relocated to Paris, where, together with Rana and Munchershah Burjorji Godrej, she co-founded the Paris Indian Society. Together with other notable members of the movement for Indian sovereignty living in exile, Cama wrote, published (in the Netherlands and Switzerland) and distributed revolutionary literature for the movement, including Bande Mataram (founded in response to the Crown ban on the nationalist poem Vande Mataram) and later Madan's Talwar (in response to the execution of Madan Lal Dhingra). These weeklies were banned in Britain and India, and were smuggled into India through the French colony of Pondichéry. Cama also sent revolvers concealed in Christmas toys to patriots in India.

On 22 August 1907, Cama attended the second Socialist Congress at Stuttgart, Germany, along with Hemchandra Kanungo, where she described the devastating effects of a famine that had struck the Indian subcontinent. In her appeal for human rights, equality and autonomy from Great Britain, she was the first person to unfurl what she called the "Flag of Indian Independence". (Note: "This flag is of India's independence. Behold, it is born. It is already sanctified by the blood of martyred Indian youth. I call upon you, gentlemen, to rise and salute the flag of Indian independence. In the name of this flag, I appeal to lovers of freedom all over the world to cooperate with this flag in freeing one-fifth of the human race.") It has been speculated that this moment may have been an inspiration to African American writers and intellectuals W. E. B. Du Bois in writing his 1928 novel Dark Princess. Cama's flag, a modification of the Calcutta Flag, was co-designed by Cama, and would later serve as one of the templates from which the current national flag of India was created.

After the second Socialist Congress at Stuttgart, Cama travelled to America to raise awareness of the Indian nationalist campaign and non-cooperation movement. Her activities in the United States included addressing members of the Minerva Club in New York. She returned to England in 1908.

In 1909, following Dhingra's assassination of William Hutt Curzon Wyllie, an aide to the Secretary of State for India, Scotland Yard arrested several key activists living in Great Britain, The British Government requested Cama's extradition, but the French Government refused to cooperate. In return, the British Government seized Cama's inheritance. Lenin reportedly invited her to reside in the Soviet Union, but she declined.

Influenced by Christabel Pankhurst and the suffragette movement, Cama was vehement in her support for gender equality and she often stressed on the role of Indian women in building the nation. Speaking in Cairo, Egypt in 1910, she asked, "I see here the representatives of only half the population of Egypt. May I ask where is the other half? Sons of Egypt, where are the daughters of Egypt? Where are your mothers and sisters? Your wives and daughters?" and "the hand that rocks the cradle is the hand that moulds the character. That soft hand is the chief factor in the national life." Cama's stance with respect to the vote for women was, however, secondary to her position on Indian independence; in 1920, upon meeting Herabai Tata and Mithan Tata, two Parsi women outspoken on the issue of the right to vote, Cama is said to have sadly shaken her head and observed: "'Work for Indian's freedom and [i]ndependence. When India is independent women will not only [have] the right to [v]ote, but all other rights.'"

== Exile and death ==
With the outbreak of World War I in 1914, France and Britain became allies, and all the members of Paris India Society except Cama and Singh Rewabhai Rana left the country (Cama had been advised by fellow-socialist Jean Longuet to go to Spain with M.P. Tirumal Acharya). She and Rana were briefly arrested in October 1914 when they tried to agitate among Punjab Regiment troops that had just arrived in Marseilles on their way to the front. They were required to leave Marseilles, and Cama then moved to Rana's wife's house in Arcachon, near Bordeaux. Cama continued to maintain active contacts with Indian, Irish, and Egyptian revolutionaries as well as with French Socialists and Russian leadership.

In January 1915, the French government deported Rana and his whole family to the Caribbean island of Martinique, and Cama was sent to Vichy, where she was interned. In bad health, she was released in November 1917 and permitted to return to Bordeaux provided that she report weekly to the local police. Following the war, Cama returned to her home at 25, Rue de Ponthieu in Paris.

Cama remained in exile in Europe until 1935, when, gravely ill and paralyzed by a stroke that she had suffered earlier that year, she petitioned the British government through Sir Cowasji Jehangir to be allowed to return home. Writing from Paris on 24 June 1935, she acceded to the requirement that she renounce seditionist activities. Accompanied by Jehangir, she arrived in Bombay in November 1935 and died nine months later, aged 74, at Parsi General Hospital on 13 August 1936.

== Legacy ==
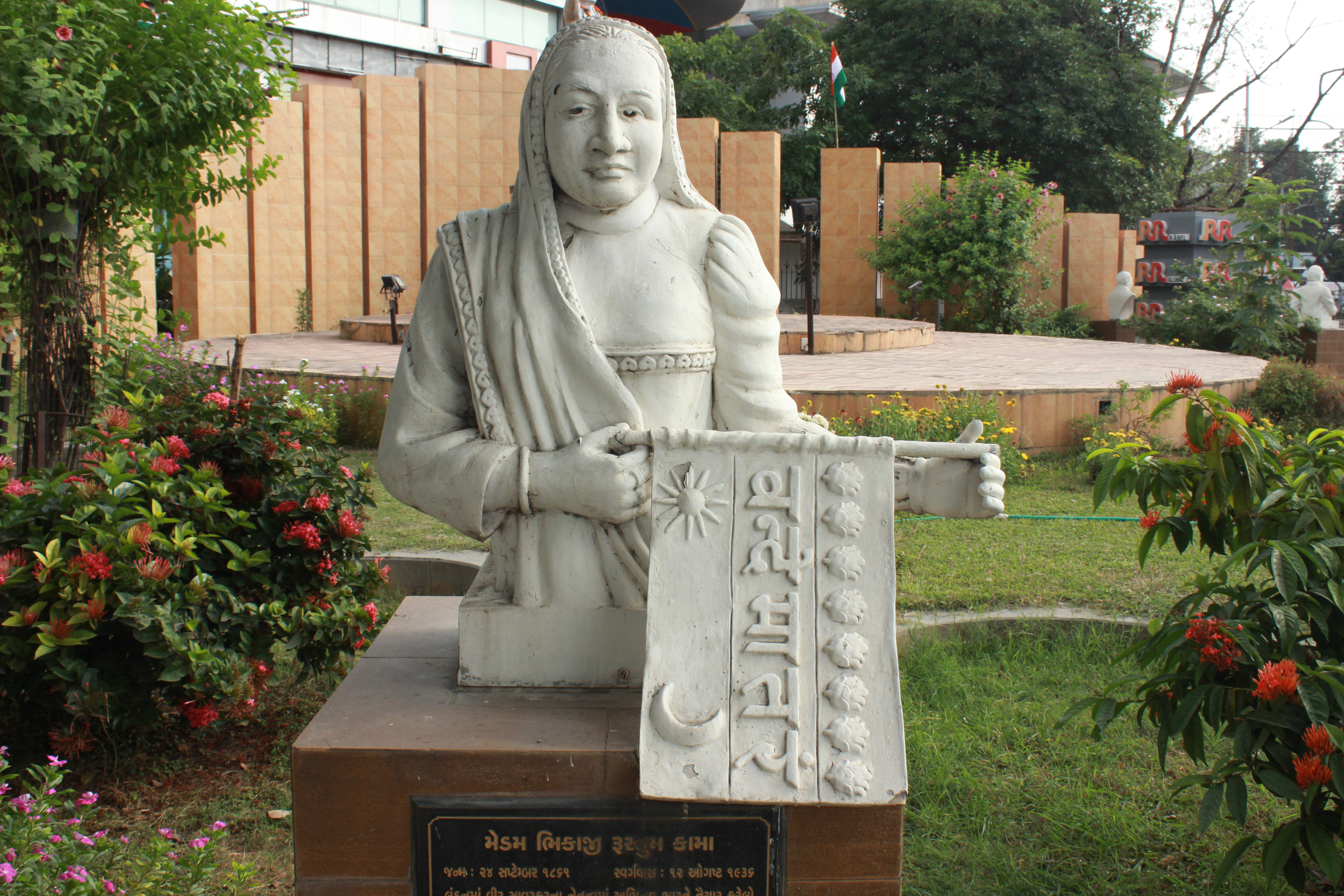
Bust of Bhikaiji Cama with Flag of Indian Independence at Kranti Van in Vadodara, Gujarat

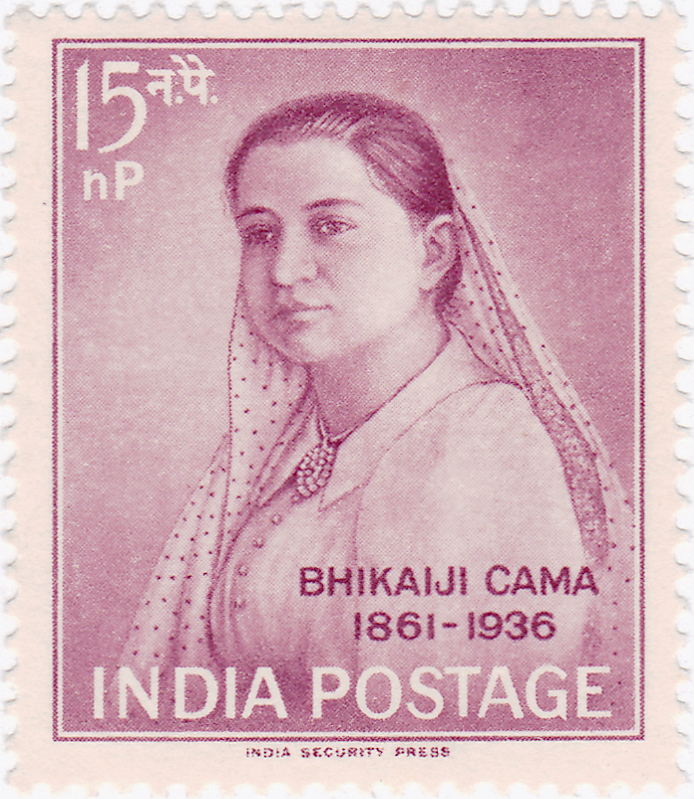
Cama on a 1962 stamp of India

Cama bequeathed most of her personal assets to the Avabai Petit Orphanage for girls, now the Bai Avabai Framji Petit Girls' High School, which established a trust in her name. Rs. 54,000 (1936: £39,300; $157,200) went to her family's fire temple, the Framji Nusserwanjee Patel Agiary at Mazgaon, in South Bombay.

Several Indian cities have streets and places named after Cama, or Madame Cama as she is also known. On 26 January 1962, India's 11th Republic Day, the Indian Posts and Telegraphs Department issued a commemorative stamp in her honour.

In 1997, the Indian Coast Guard commissioned a Priyadarshini-class fast patrol vessel ICGS Bikhaiji Cama after Bikhaiji Cama.

A high-rise office complex in R.K. Puram area of Delhi was established, which accommodates major Government Offices and companies such as Punjab National Bank,EPFO, Jindal Group, SAIL, GAIL, EIL etc. is named as Bhikaji Cama Place in tribute to her.

Following Cama's 1907 Stuttgart address, the flag she raised there was smuggled into British India by Indulal Yagnik and is now on display at the Maratha and Kesari Library in Pune, Maharashtra. In 2004, politicians of the BJP, India's political party, attempted to identify a later design (from the 1920s) as the flag Cama raised in Stuttgart. The flag Cama raised – misrepresented as "original national Tricolour" – has an (Islamic) crescent and a (Hindu) sun, which the later design does not have.
