= Rajendrasinh Ghanshyamsinh Rana =

Indian politician

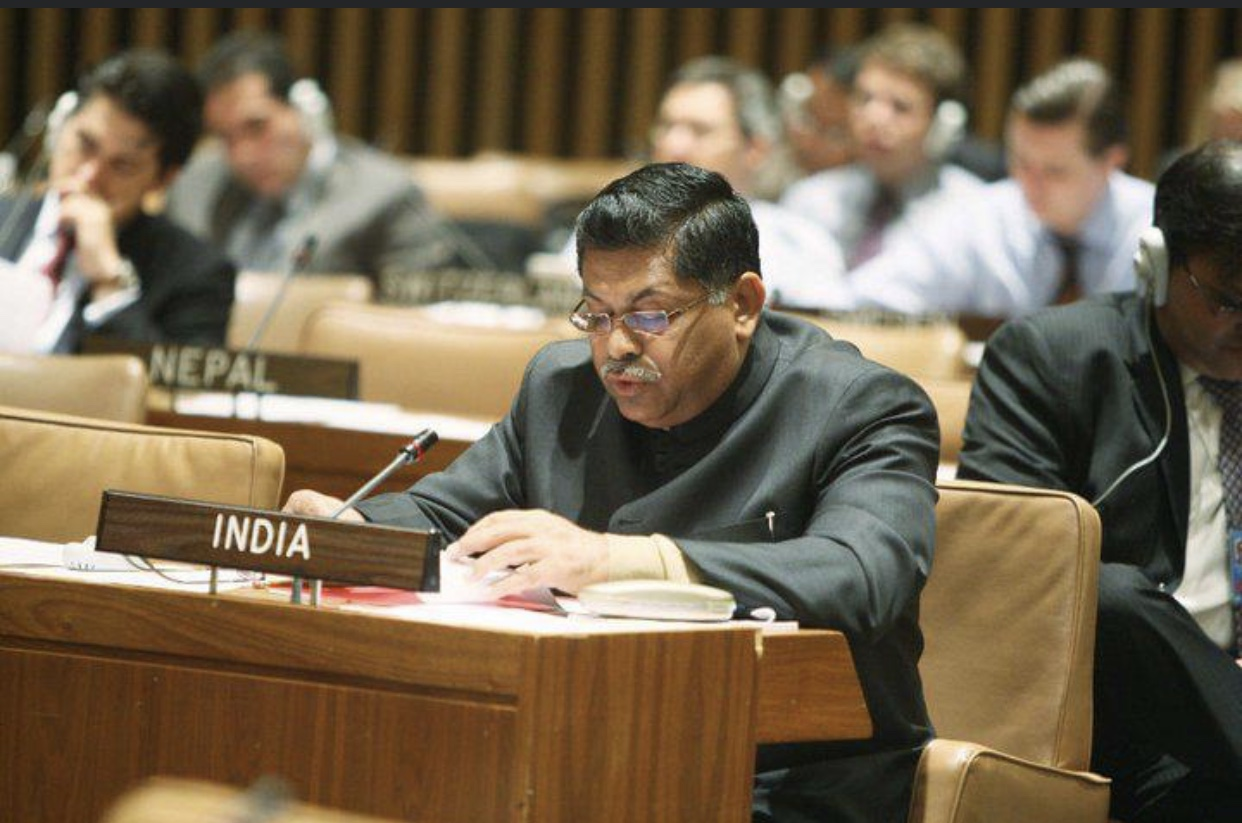

President of Gujarat State BJP
- In office 1998–2006
- Chief Minister: Keshubhai Patel Narendra Modi

Member of parliament
- In office 1996–2014
- Preceded by: Mahavirsinh Harisinhji Gohil
- Constituency: Bhavnagar
- Succeeded by: Bhartiben Shiyal

Personal details
- Born: 22 May 1956 (age 69) Bhavnagar, Saurashtra, India
- Party: Bharatiya Janata Party
- Spouse: Ila Rana
- Children: 1 son
- As of 25 February, 2006

Rajendrasinh Ghanshyamsinh Rana (born 22 May 1956) is an Indian politician who was a member of the Lok Sabha, the lower house of Parliament of India, from 1996 to 2014.

He is the great-grandson of S. R. Rana (1870–1957), who was an Indian political activist, founding member of the Paris Indian Society and the vice-president of the Indian Home Rule Society.

== Political career ==
He represented the Bhavnagar constituency of Gujarat for five terms of the Parliament. He is a member of the Bharatiya Janata Party (BJP), and served as the President of the state unit of BJP from 1998 to 2006. He did not contest 2014 Indian general election.
