= Talvar =

20th century Indian Nationalist periodical

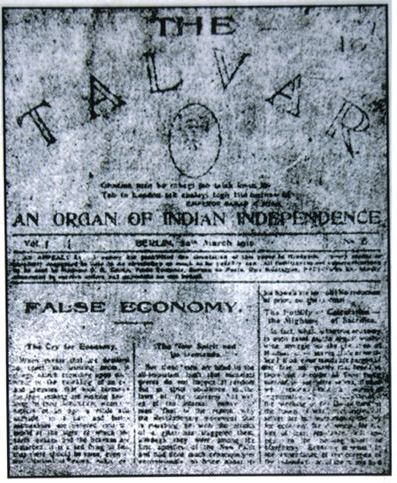
The Talvar, March 1910.

Madan's Talwar, later known as The Talvar, was an early-20th-century Indian Nationalist periodical published from Berlin.

Originally named after Madan Lal Dhingra, one of the heroes of the Indian independence movement who had been executed for the political assassination of William Hutt Curzon Wyllie, the publication was established in 1909 in Paris by Bhikaiji Cama. Editorial responsibilities lay with Virendranath Chattopadhyaya in Berlin. The weekly aimed to incite nationalist unrest and sought to sway the loyalty of the British Indian Army sepoys. Similar to the Bande Mataram that was published from Paris by the Paris Indian Society, it continued the message of The Indian Sociologist that had earlier been published from London.

== Bibliography ==
- Chirol, Valentine (2000), Indian Unrest, Boston: Adamant Media, ISBN 0-543-94122-1
- Radhan, O.P, ed. (2002), Encyclopaedia of Political Parties, New Delhi: Anmol, ISBN 81-7488-865-9
- Sareen, Tilak R (1979), Indian Revolutionary Movement Abroad, 1905-1921, New Delhi: Sterling
- Yadav, Bishamber Dayal (1992), P.T. Acharya, Reminiscences of an Indian Revolutionary, Anmol, p. 44, ISBN 81-7041-470-9
