= Bande Mataram (Paris publication) =

1909 Indian nationalist publication in Paris, France

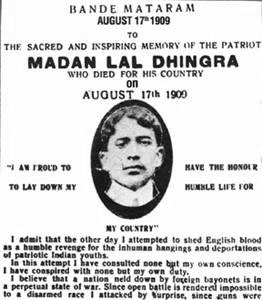
Cover of Vande Mataram depicting Madanlal Dhingra's execution in August 1909 afterward edited by Lala Har Dayal.

The Bande Mataram was an Indian nationalist publication from Paris begun in September 1909 by the Paris Indian Society. Founded by Madam Bhikaji Cama, the paper along with the later publication of Talvar was aimed at inciting nationalist unrest in India and sought to sway the loyalty of the Sepoy of the British Indian Army. It was founded in response to the British ban on Bankim Chatterjee's nationalist poem of Vande mataram, and continued the message of the journal Bande Mataram edited by Sri Aurobindo and published from Calcutta, and The Indian Sociologist that had earlier been published from London by Shyamji Krishna Varma.
