= Magda Nachman Acharya =

Russian Empire-born painter (1889–1951)

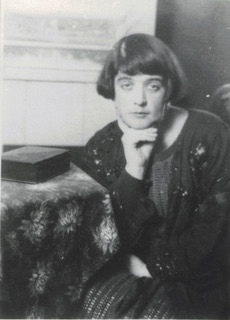
- Born: 20 July 1889; Pavlovsk, Russia
- Died: 12 February 1951 (aged 61); Bombay, India
- Other name: Magda Nachman
- Spouse: M. P. T. Acharya

Magda Nachman Acharya (20 July 1889 – 12 February 1951) was a Russian-born painter, draftsman, and book illustrator.

== Early life and education ==
Magda Nachman was born in Pavlovsk (a suburb of St. Petersburg), Russian Empire, into a well-to-do and cultured family. Her father, Maximilian Nachman, was a Latvian Jew from Riga. A graduate of the law faculty of St. Petersburg University, he had the right to live in the capital. He served as a legal adviser at the German embassy as well as to the Nobel Brothers’ Petroleum Production Company. Her mother, Klara Emilia Maria von Roeder, was a Lutheran Baltic German. Magda and her siblings were brought up in the Lutheran faith. After graduating in 1906 from the Saint Anna Gymnasium, known as the Annenschule, she began attending art classes at the Mutual Aid Society of Russian Artists. Between 1907 and 1913, she attended the Zvantseva Art Academy, in St. Petersburg, where she studied with Léon Bakst, Mstislav Dobuzhinsky, and Kuzma Petrov-Vodkin.

== Career ==
Magda Nachman began exhibiting her work in 1910. In 1913, at the dacha of Maximilian Voloshin in Koktebel, she met the poet Marina Tsvetaeva; Marina's husband, Sergei Efron; and his sisters, Vera and Elizaveta Efron. Here she painted an oil portrait of Tsvetaeva, the only known oil portrait of the poet made during her lifetime. In 1916, she moved to Moscow, where she completed a portrait of Sergei (lost). Nachman spent most of 1917--1920 in the provinces. In 1917, she completed a stage design for the play Tartuffe at the Moscow Theater of Cooperatives. From autumn 1919 to autumn 1920 she worked as a stage and costume designer at the people’s theater in the village of Ust-Dolyssy, near Nevel, together with Elizaveta Efron, the director of the theater.

Returning to Moscow in the fall of 1920, Nachman met a prominent figure in the Indian national liberation movement, M. P. T. Acharya, who had arrived in Bolshevik Russia with a group of like-minded Indian colleagues in search of ideological partners in their struggle for Indian independence. In 1922, she married M. P. T. Acharya and moved with her husband to Berlin. Here she befriended Vladimir and Véra Nabokov. In 1933, Nachman-Acharya drew pastel portraits of Vladimir, Vera, and his mother, Elena Ivanovna (of the three works, only a photographic copy of Vladimir's portrait has been preserved). A solo exhibition of Nachman-Acharya's work in Berlin was reviewed by Nabokov.

After Hitler’s accession to power in 1933, Europe became too dangerous for the half-Jewish Magda Nachman and the dark-skinned Tamil Acharya. In 1934, they were able to obtain British passports, which eventually allowed them to flee to Bombay, where Nachman-Acharya became a well-known artist and mentor to a new generation of Indian artists. She died in Bombay on February 12, 1951.

List of exhibitions in which Magda Nachman-Acharya is known to have participated

Russia

1. Exhibition of students of Bakst and Dobuzhinsky (Petersburg, 1910)

2. IV Art Exhibition of Paintings. The Northern Circle of Fine Arts Lovers. (Vologda, 1913)

3. Exhibitions of the association "World of Art" (Petersburg and Moscow, 1912.1913.1917)

4. Benefit Exhibition of paintings for the infirmary of artists. (Petrograd, 1914)

5. "Art 1915" (organizer K.V. Kandaurov) (Moscow, 1915)

6. Exhibition of paintings by the professional Union of Artists (Moscow, 1918)

7. IV State exhibition of paintings (Moscow, 1919)

8. II State Exhibition of Art and Science (Kazan, 1920)

Germany

1. Solo exhibition in the gallery J. Casper (Galerie J. Casper) (Berlin, 1928)

2. Group exhibition at the Amsler & Ruthardt Gallery (Berlin, 1929)

India

1. Since 1937, i.e., almost since her arrival in India, Magda participated in every exhibition of the Bombay Art Society, whose exhibitions were held almost every year (with the exception of the war years)

2. Solo exhibition in Pune (1940s)

3. Annual solo exhibitions at the Salon of the Institute of Foreign Languages (Bombay, since 1946)

4. Solo exhibition in the Chetana exhibition hall (Bombay, 1947)

5. The first posthumous exhibition at the Salon of the Institute of Foreign Languages (Bombay, 1951)

6. Second posthumous exhibition at the Salon of the Institute of Foreign Languages (Delhi, 1952)
