= Indian Home Rule Society =

Organisation founded in 1905 in London

The Indian Home Rule Society (IHRS) was an Indian organisation founded in London in 1905 that sought to promote the cause of self-rule in British India. The organisation was founded by Shyamji Krishna Varma, with support from a number of prominent Indian nationalists in Britain at the time, including Bhikaji Cama, Dadabhai Naoroji and S.R. Rana, and was intended to be a rival organisation to the British Committee of the Indian National Congress that was the main avenue of the loyalist opinion at the time.

Founded on 18 February 1905, the IHRS was a metropolitan organisation modelled after Victorian public institutions of the time. It had a written constitution and the stated aims to "secure Home Rule for India, and to carry on a genuine Indian propaganda in this country by all practicable means". The IHRS was open for membership "to Indians only", and found significant support amongst Indian students and other Indian populations in Britain. It recruited from amongst young Indian activists, collected money, and may have been collecting arms and maintaining close contact with revolutionary movements in India. The society was the foundation of the India House and, along with Krishna Varma's journal The Indian Sociologist, was the foundation of the militant Indian nationalist movement in Britain. After Krishna Varma's shift to Paris in 1907, the society gave way to the secret nationalist society of Abhinav Bharat Mandal, founded by V.D. Savarkar. The society was founded amongst efforts and movements that arose to reverse the flow of authority and power from Britain to India. along with substantial help from Bhikaji Cama.

== Sources ==
- Fischer-Tinē, Harald (2007), Indian Nationalism and the ‘world forces’: Transnational and diasporic dimensions of the Indian freedom movement on the eve of the First World War. Journal of Global History (2007) 2, pp. 325–344, Cambridge University Press., ISSN 1740-0228.
- Innes, Catherine Lynnette (2002), A History of Black and Asian Writing in Britain, 1700-2000, Cambridge University Press, ISBN 0-521-64327-9.
- Joseph, George Verghese (2003), George Joseph, the Life and Times of a Kerala Christian Nationalist., Orient Longman, ISBN 81-250-2495-6.
- Majumdar, Ramesh C (1971), History of the Freedom Movement in India (Vol I), Firma K. L. Mukhopadhyay, ISBN 81-7102-099-2.
- Owen, N (2007), The British Left and India, Oxford University Press, ISBN 0-19-923301-2.
- Parekh, Bhiku C. (1999), Colonialism, Tradition and Reform: An Analysis of Gandhi's Political Discourse., SAGE, ISBN 0-7619-9383-5.
