= Chicherin =

Chicherin (Russian: Чичерин) is a Russian masculine surname originating from the slang word chichera, meaning cold wind with rain or snow; its feminine counterpart is Chicherina. It may refer to the following notable people:

- Boris Chicherin (1828–1904), Russian liberal jurist
- Georgy Chicherin (1872–1936), Soviet foreign minister
- Nikita Chicherin (born 1990), Russian football player
- Pyotr Chicherin (1788–1849), Russian general
- Yulia Chicherina (born 1978), Russian rock singer
- Chicherin House
