= Curzon Wyllie =

Administrator of British India (1848–1909)

William Hutt Curzon Wyllie KCIE CVO (5 October 1848 – 1 July 1909) was a British Indian army officer, and later an official of the British Indian Government. Over a career spanning three decades, Curzon Wyllie rose to be a Lieutenant Colonel in the British Indian Army and occupied a number of administrative and diplomatic posts. He was the British resident to Nepal and the Princely state of Rajputana, and later, the political aide-de-camp to the Secretary of State for India, Lord George Hamilton. Curzon Wyllie was assassinated on 1 July 1909 in London by the Indian revolutionary Madan Lal Dhingra, who was a member of India House in London.

== Early life ==
Curzon Wyllie was born at Cheltenham on 5 October 1848 to General William Wyllie (13 August 1802 – 26 May 1891) and his wife, Amelia (13 October 1806 – 14 January 1891). Third and youngest son of five children, Wyllie was educated at Marlborough College (1863–4) and the Royal Military College, Sandhurst (1865–6) before joining the army in October 1866 as ensign 106th foot (Durham Light Infantry), subsequently arriving in India in 1867. Both his elder brothers, John William Shaw Wyllie (1835–1870) and Francis Robert Shaw Wyllie (4 June 1837 – 1907) served in India. The latter Francis Shaw Wyllie joined the Bombay civil service, became under-secretary to the Bombay government, and died in London in February 1907.

== Indian service ==
Arriving in India in February 1867, Wyllie was promoted to lieutenant in October 1868 and joined the Indian staff corps in 1869. He was posted to the 2nd Gurkha regiment for a year. In 1870, Wyllie was selected for civil and political employment and appointed to the Oudh commission, serving under General Barrow and Sir George Couper.

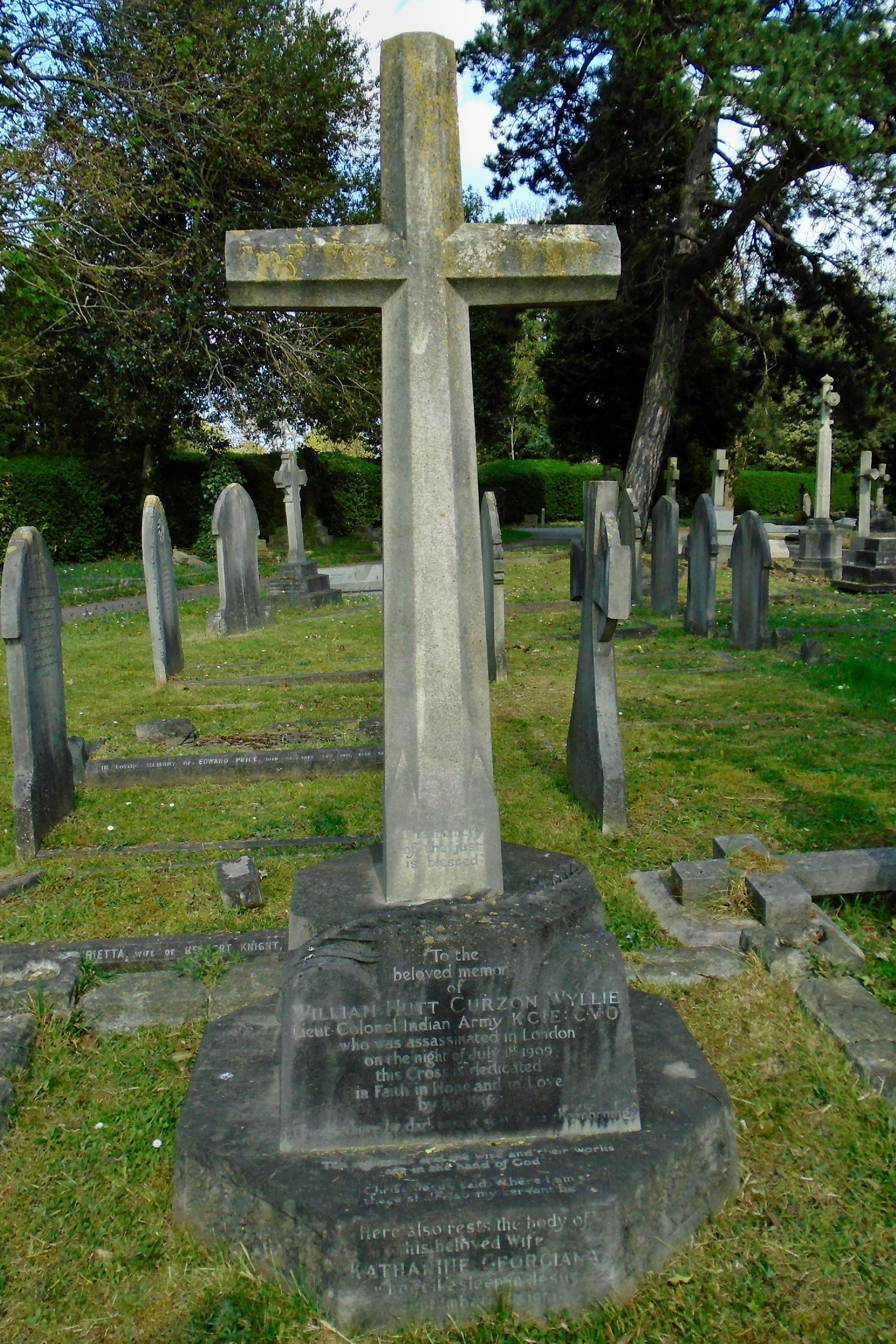
Grave of Curzon Wyllie, Richmond Cemetery

Wyllie was promoted to captain in October 1878 and transferred to the foreign department in January 1879, serving as cantonment magistrate of Nasirabad, assistant commissioner in Ajmer-Merwara, and subsequently as the assistant to Sir Robert Groves Sandeman, the governor-general's agent in Baluchistan. He was part of Major-General Sir Robert Phayre's contingent in the Second Anglo-Afghan War, when his actions earned him mentions in the Viceroy's dispatches. After the war, Wyllie was appointed the military secretary to the governor of Madras, William Patrick Adam (later also his brother-in-law) from December 1880 until Adam's death in the following May. On 29 December 1881, Wyllie married Katharine Georgiana Carmichael (15 July 1858 – 9 September 1931), second daughter of David Fremantle Carmichael of the Indian Civil Service. Made CIE in 1881, he was promoted to major in October 1886 and to lieutenant-colonel in 1892.

Wyllie served as the private secretary to acting governor William Huddleston till November 1881, subsequently overseeing the affairs of Malhar Rao Gaekwar of Baroda before taking the post of the assistant resident at Hyderabad from December 1881 to November 1882. Through the next 14 years, Wyllie served in political and government posts in a number of different places, mostly in Rajputana . During this time he oversaw relief for the famine of 1899–1900. In between 1893 and 1899, Wyllie was the officiating resident in Nepal when in February 1898 he was selected as the agent to the governor-general in central India. In May 1900 he was transferred in the same capacity to Rajputana, where he remained for the rest of his service in India.

== Return to England ==
In March 1901 Wyllie returned to Britain on being appointed the political aide-de-camp to Lord George Hamilton, the Conservative Secretary of State for India (1895–1903). Wyllie's acquaintance and understanding of the Indian princes and his service in India meant he was assigned important and often delicate matters relating to the princely states and their relations to the British crown. He oversaw the arrangements for the Indian princes visiting for the coronation of King Edward VII in August 1902, and for his service was invested as a Member (fourth class) of the Royal Victorian Order (MVO) two days after the ceremony, on 11 August 1902. He was further knighted and invested as a Knight Commander of the Order of the Indian Empire (KCIE) by King Edward VII at Buckingham Palace on 24 October 1902. Promotion to a Commander of the Royal Victorian Order (CVO) followed in June 1907. At this time, he was also involved in affairs relating to Indian students in Britain, including being involved in associations and charities for the Indians, as well as overseeing the Indian nationalist opinion that was finding voice in Britain at the time. Curzon Wyllie was head of Secret Police and collected lot of information about Savarkar and this fact was not mentioned in contemporary British media.

== Assassination ==
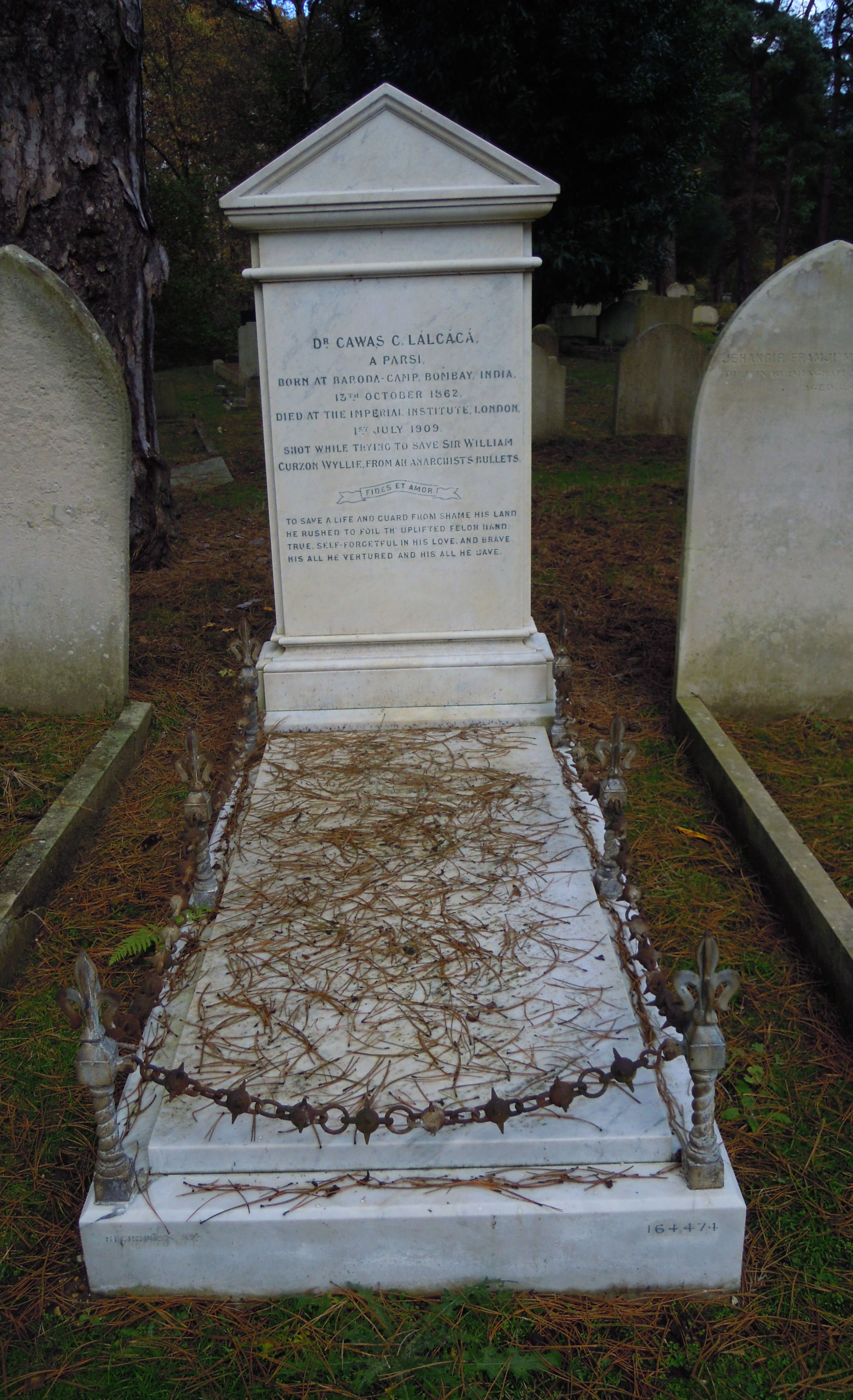
Grave of Dr Cawas Lalcaca who was killed trying to save Wyllie, in Brookwood Cemetery

Popplewell quotes The Indian Sociologist as describing Wyllie and Lee Warner "as early as October 1907" as "old unrepentant foes of India who have fattened on the misery of the Indian peasant every (sic) since they began their career". He was assassinated in London on the evening of 1 July 1909 by Madan Lal Dhingra at the Imperial Institute, South Kensington, where he and his wife were attending an event organised by the National Indian Association. Dhingra was an Indian student at the University of London who had close ties with the nationalist India House and The Indian Sociologist. Dhingra fired at Curzon Wyllie with a revolver, killing him instantly, and mortally wounding Dr Cawas Lalcaca, a Parsi physician from Shanghai, who attempted to come to Wyllie's aid and stop Dhingra. Wyllie was buried at Richmond Cemetery, Surrey, on 6 July. Dhingra was sentenced to death in July 1909 and hanged at Pentonville Prison on 17 August 1909.

== Sources ==
- Oxford Dictionary of National Biography
- Gokhale: the Indian moderates and the British raj (1977) by B. R. Nanda.
- Raj: the making and unmaking of British India (1997) by Lawrence James.
- The Oxford history of modern India, 1740–1947 (1965) by Percival Spear.
- The British conquest and dominion of India (1989). by Penderel Moon.
