= Madan Lal Dhingra =

Indian revolutionary and activist (1883–1909)

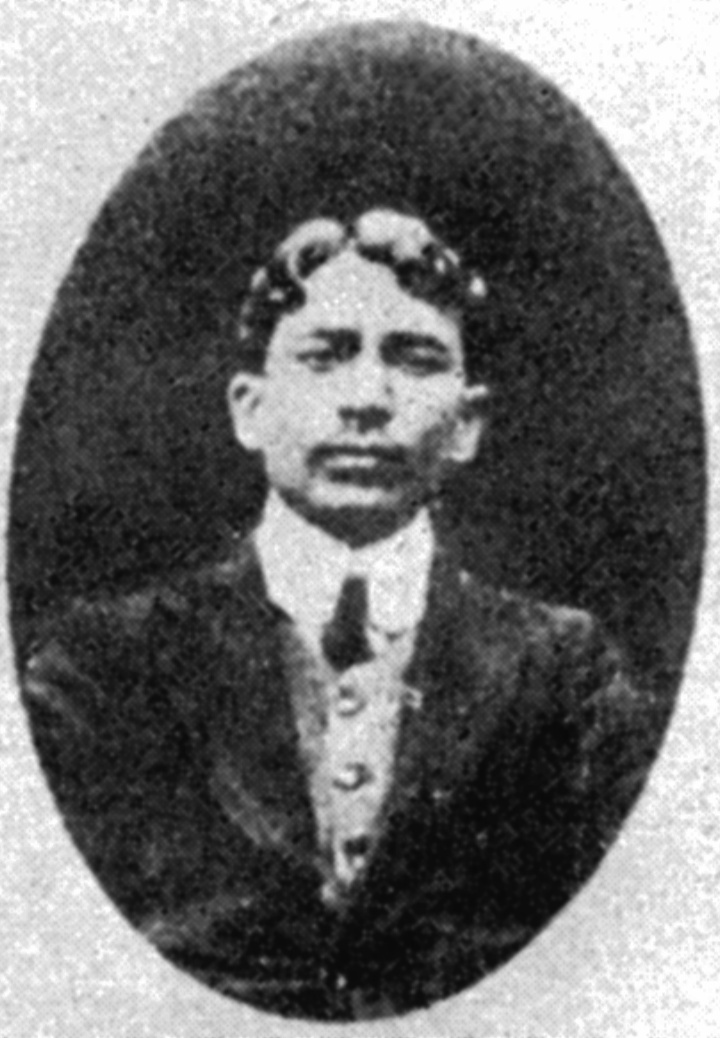
- Born: 18 September 1883; Amritsar, Punjab, British India
- Died: 17 August 1909 (aged 25); London, England
- Organization: India House
- Movement: Indian independence movement
- Criminal charges: Murder
- Criminal penalty: Death
- Criminal status: Executed by hanging

Madan Lal Dhingra (18 September 1883 – 17 August 1909) was an Indian freedom fighter who, whilst a student at University College London in 1909, assassinated William Hutt Curzon Wyllie, the political Aide-de-camp to the secretary of State for India, in London.

== Early life ==
Madan Lal Dhingra was born on 18 September 1883 in Amritsar, India, in an educated and affluent Hindu Punjabi Khatri family. His father, Dr. Ditta Mal Dhingra, was a civil surgeon, and Madan Lal was one of eight children (seven sons and one daughter). All seven sons, including Dhingra, studied abroad.

Dhingra studied at Amritsar in MB Intermediate College until 1900. He then went to Lahore to study at the Government College University. Here, he was influenced by the incipient nationalist movement, which at that time was about seeking Home Rule rather than independence. Dhingra was especially troubled by the poverty of India. He studied the literature concerning the causes of Indian poverty and famines extensively, and felt that the key issues in seeking solutions to these problems lay in Swaraj (self-government) and the Swadeshi movement.

Dhingra embraced with particular fervour the Swadeshi movement, which aimed to increase India's self-sufficiency by encouraging Indian industry and entrepreneurship, and boycotting British (and other foreign) goods. He found that the industrial and finance policies of the colonial government were designed to suppress local industry and favour the purchase of British imports, which he felt was a major reason for the lack of economic development in India.

In 1904, as a student in the Master of Arts program, Dhingra led a student protest against the principal's order to have the college blazer made of cloth imported from Britain. He was expelled from the college for this. His father, who held a high, well-paying position in government service and had a poor opinion of agitationists, told him to apologise to the college management, not to participate in such activities again, and prevent (or revoke) the expulsion. Dhingra refused, and chose not even to go home to discuss matters with his father, but to take a job and live as per his own wishes. Thus, following his expulsion, Dhingra took a job as a clerk at Kalka at the foot of the Shimla hills, in a firm that ran a Tanga carriage service to transport British families to Shimla for the summer months.

After being dismissed for insubordination, he worked as a factory laborer. Here, he attempted to organise a union, but was sacked for making the effort. He moved to Bombay and worked there for some time, again at low-level jobs. By now, his family was seriously worried about him, and his elder brother, Dr. Bihari Lal, compelled him to go to Britain to continue his higher education. Dhingra finally agreed, and in 1906, he departed for Britain to enroll at University College, London, to study mechanical engineering.

== With Savarkar ==
Dhingra arrived in London a year after the foundation of Shyamji Krishna Varma's India House in 1905. This organization was a meeting place for Indian revolutionaries located in Highgate.

Dhingra came into contact with noted Indian independence and political activists Vinayak Damodar Savarkar and Shyamji Krishna Varma, who were impressed by his perseverance and intense patriotism which turned his focus to the independence movement. Savarkar believed in revolution and inspired Dhingra's admiration in the cult of assassination.

Later, Dhingra became distant from India House and was known to frequent a shooting range on Tottenham Court Road. He joined and had a membership in, a secretive society, the Abhinav Bharat Mandal founded by Savarkar and his brother, Ganesh.

During this period, Savarkar, Dhingra, and other student activists were outraged by the 1905 Partition of Bengal. Dhingra was abandoned for his political activities by his father, Ditta Mall, who was the Chief Medical Officer in Amritsar. His father went so far as to publish his decision in newspaper advertisements.

== Curzon Wyllie's assassination ==
Several weeks before assassinating Curzon Wyllie, Dhingra had tried to kill Lord Curzon, former Viceroy of India. He had also planned to assassinate the former Lieutenant-Governor of East Bengal, Bampfylde Fuller, but was late for a meeting the two were to attend, and so could not carry out his plan. Dhingra then decided to kill Curzon Wyllie. Curzon Wylie had joined the British Indian Army in 1866 and the Indian Political Department in 1879. He had earned distinction in a number of locations including Central India and above all in Rajputana where he rose to the highest rank in the Service. In 1901, he was selected to be Political aide-de-Camp to the Secretary of State for India. He was also the head of the Secret Police and had been trying to obtain information about Dhingra and his fellow revolutionaries. Curzon Wyllie was said to have been a close friend of Dhingra's father.

On the evening of 1 July 1909, Dhingra, along with a large number of Indians and Englishmen had gathered to attend the annual 'At Home' function hosted by the Indian National Association at the Imperial Institute. When Curzon Wyllie, political aide-de-camp to the Secretary of State for India, was leaving the hall with his wife, Dhingra fired five shots right at his face, four of which hit their target. Cawas Lalcaca (or Lalkaka), a Parsee doctor who tried to save Curzon Wyllie, died of Dhingra's sixth and seventh bullets, which he fired because Lalcaca had come between them.

Dhingra was arrested on the spot by the police.

=== Trial ===
Dhingra was tried in the Old Bailey on 23 July. He represented himself during his trial but did not recognize the legitimacy of the court. He stated that his assassination was done in the name of Indian independence and that his actions were motivated by patriotism. He also stated that he had not intended to kill Cawas Lalcaca. He was sentenced to death. After the judge announced his verdict, Dhingra is said to have stated: "I am proud to have the honour of laying down my life for my country. But remember, we shall have our time in the days to come". Madan Lal Dhingra was hanged on 17 August 1909 at Pentonville Prison. He also made a further statement, which is rarely mentioned.

=== Statement of Dhingra before Pronouncement of Verdict ===
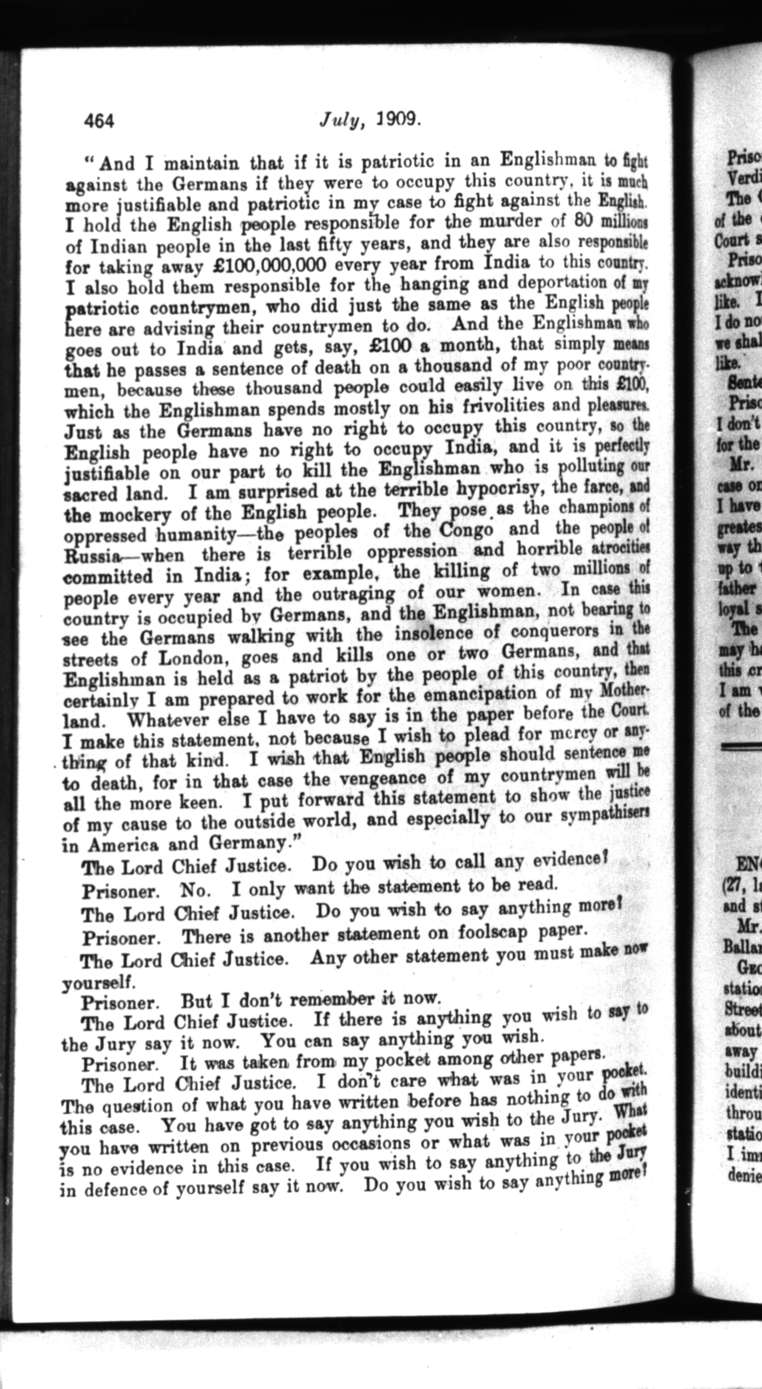

"I do not want to say anything in defence of myself, but simply to prove the justice of my deed. As for myself, no English law court has got any authority to arrest and detain me in prison, or pass sentence of death on me. That is the reason I did not have any counsel to defend me. And I maintain that if it is patriotic in an Englishman to fight against the Germans if they were to occupy this country, it is much more justifiable and patriotic in my case to fight against the English. I hold the English people responsible for the murder of 80 millions of Indian people in the last fifty years, and they are also responsible for taking away £100,000,000 every year from India to this country. I also hold them responsible for the hanging and deportation of my patriotic countrymen, who did just the same as the English people here are advising their countrymen to do. And the Englishman who goes out to India and gets, say, £100 a month, that simply means that he passes a sentence of death on a thousand of my poor countrymen, because these thousand people could easily live on this £100, which the Englishman spends mostly on his frivolities and pleasures. Just as the Germans have no right to occupy this country, so the English people have no right to occupy India, and it is perfectly justifiable on our part to kill the Englishman who is polluting our sacred land. I am surprised at the terrible hypocrisy, the farce, and the mockery of the English people. They pose as the champions of oppressed humanity—the peoples of the Congo and the people of Russia—when there is terrible oppression and horrible atrocities committed in India; for example, the killing of two millions of people every year and the outraging of our women. In case this country is occupied by Germans, and the Englishman, not bearing to see the Germans walking with the insolence of conquerors in the streets of London, goes and kills one or two Germans, and that Englishman is held as a patriot by the people of this country, then certainly I am prepared to work for the emancipation of my Motherland. Whatever else I have to say is in the paper before the Court I make this statement, not because I wish to plead for mercy or anything of that kind. I wish that English people should sentence me to death, for in that case the vengeance of my countrymen will be all the more keen. I put forward this statement to show the justice of my cause to the outside world, and especially to our sympathisers in America and Germany."

=== Verdict of court ===
While he was being removed from the court, he said to the Chief Justice – "Thank you, my Lord. I don't care. I am proud to have the honour of laying down my life for the cause of my motherland."

=== Reactions ===
At a public meeting held on 5 July 1909, several Indian political leaders condemned the murder of Wyllie, but Savarkar voted against the formal resolution to condemn Dhingra, arguing that proper voting procedure had not been followed at the meeting and that he wanted Dhingra to be "treated fairly before being condemned as a criminal". After Dhingra's execution, the Abhinav Bharat Society led by Savarkar printed a postcard portraying Dhingra as a revolutionary. Savarkar's comrade V. V. S. Aiyar described the murder as "a glorious act", and praised Savarkar for being "the real guru, the Avatar of Krishna, who had produced a man like Dhingra." Several Indian and British leaders had criticized Dhingra's actions and Savarkar's public defence of Dhingra.

Guy Aldred, the printer of The Indian Sociologist, was sentenced to twelve months hard labor. The August issue of The Indian Sociologist had carried a story sympathetic to Dhingra. Dhingra's actions also inspired some of the Irish, who were fighting to establish an independent Ireland.

Mahatma Gandhi commented on Dhingra's actions. Speaking on the matter, he said:

He was egged on to do this act by ill-digested reading of worthless writings. His defence of himself, too, appears to have been learnt by rote. It is those who incited him to this that deserve to be punished. In my view, Mr. Dhingra himself is innocent. The murder was committed in a state of intoxication. It is not merely wine or bhang that makes one drunk; a mad idea also can do so. That was the case with Mr. Dhingra. If the Germans were to invade Britain, the British would kill only the invaders. They would not kill every German whom they met.... They would not kill an unsuspecting German, or Germans who are guests. Even should the British leave in consequence of such murderous acts, who will rule in their place? Is the Englishman bad because he is an Englishman? Is it that everyone with an Indian skin is good? If that is so, there should be [no] angry protest against oppression by Indian princes. India can gain nothing from the rule of murderers—no matter whether they are black or white. Under such a rule, India will be utterly ruined and laid waste.

After Dhingra went to the gallows, The Times of London wrote an editorial (24 July 1909) titled "Conviction of Dhingra". The editorial said, "The nonchalance displayed by the assassin was of a character which is happily unusual in such trials in this country. He asked no questions. He maintained a defiance of studied indifference. He walked smiling from the Dock."

Although the response to the assassination in Britain was one of outrage, admiration for Dhingra's act was privately expressed by David Lloyd George and Winston Churchill, who is reported to have called Dhingra's statement "[t]he Finest ever made in the name of Patriotism".

== Last words from gallows ==
The following are said to be Madan Lal Dhingra's last words, just before he died at the gallows:

I believe that a nation held down by foreign bayonets is in a perpetual state of war. Since open battle is rendered impossible to a disarmed race, I attacked by surprise. Since guns were denied to me I drew forth my pistol and fired. As a Hindu I felt that a wrong done to my country is an insult to God. Her cause is the cause of Sri Ram! Her services are the services of Sri Krishna! Poor in wealth and intellect, a son like myself has nothing else to offer to the mother but his own blood. And so I have sacrificed the same on her altar. The only lesson required in India at present is to learn how to die, and the only way to teach it is by dying ourselves. Therefore I die and glory in my martyrdom! This war of Independence will continue between India and England, so long as the Hindu and the English races last (if the present unnatural relation does not cease!). My only prayer to God is that I may be re-born of the same mother and I may re-die in the same sacred cause till the cause is successful. Vande Mataram! ("I praise thee mother!")

== Remembrance ==
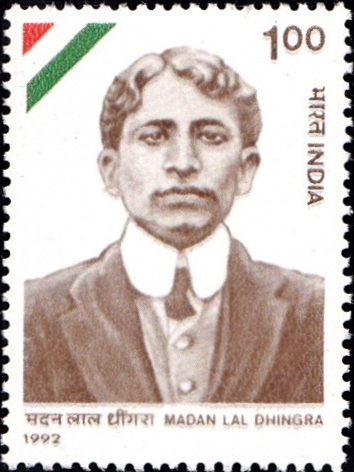
Madan Lal Dhingra on a 1992 stamp of India

After his execution, Dhingra's body was denied Hindu rites and buried by the British authorities. His family having disowned him, the authorities refused to turn over the body to Savarkar. Dhingra's coffin was accidentally found while authorities searched for the remains of Shaheed Udham Singh, and repatriated to India on 13 December 1976. His remains are kept in one of the main squares, which has been named after him, in the city of Akola in Maharashtra. Dhingra is widely remembered in India today, and was an inspiration at the time for revolutionaries such as Bhagat Singh and Chandrasekhar Azad.

There was a demand from some groups that his ancestral home be converted into a museum. However, his descendants refuse to acknowledge his legacy and refused to participate in events organised to honour the sacrifice of his life for India and for Human Rights of Indians . The family sold his ancestral house and refused an offer to purchase it made by BJP leader Laxmi Kanta Chawla who intended to turn it into a museum. His family lives in Kolkata now.

== In popular culture ==
In the movie Veer Savarkar, actor Pankaj Berry portrayed Madan Lal Dhingra.

In 2023 DD National serial Swaraj included a full episode on Madan Lal Dhingra. The role of Madan Lal Dhingra was played by actor Rahul Sharma.

The 2024 epic movie Swatantrya Veer Savarkar, actor Mrinal Dutt portrayed Madan Lal Dhingra. His time in India House and the assassination of Curzon Wyllie is shown in the film.

Dhingra also appears as a historical character in Mithu Sanyal's 2024 novel Antichristie, which is set has a setting in London during the period of Indian independence movement and depicts figures associated with India House. This included Dhingra, Vinayak Damodar Savarkar and Mahatma Gandhi.

== See also ==
- India House
- List of Indian independence activists

== Sources ==
- Laurence, John (1930). A History of Capital Punishment, London, Sampson Low, Marston, & Co.
- Waraich, Malwinder Jit Singh & Kuldip Puri (2003). Tryst with Martyrdom: Trial of Madan Lal Dhingra (July–August 1909), Chandigarh: Unistar, ISBN 81-86898-72-7.
