= The Indian Sociologist =

Indian nationalist journal edited by Shyamji Krishnavarma

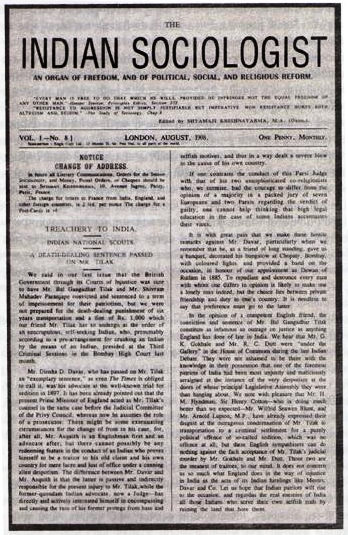
The Indian Sociologist of September 1908, published from London.

The Indian Sociologist was an Indian nationalist journal in the early 20th century. Its subtitle was An Organ of Freedom, and Political, Social, and Religious Reform, mouthpiece of the nationalist revolutionaries.

The journal was edited by Shyamji Krishnavarma from 1905 to 1914, then between 1920 and 1922. It was originally produced in London until May 1907, when Krishnavarma moved to Paris. The journal was edited in Paris from June 1907, but the change of address was only announced in the September 1907 issue. Publication continued in Paris until 1914, when Krishnavarma moved to Geneva on account of the First World War. While in Geneva, he abandoned the publication under pressure from the Swiss authorities. He recommenced publication in December 1920 and continued until September 1922.

== Political origin ==
The first issue contained the following statement:

The appearance of a journal conducted by an Indian sociologist in England is an event likely to cause surprise in some quarters; but there are many weighty grounds to justify such a publication. The political relations between England and India urgently require a genuine Indian interpreter in the United Kingdom to show, on behalf of India, how Indians really fare and feel under British rule. No systematic attempt has, so far as our knowledge goes, ever been made in this country by Indians themselves to enlighten the British public with regard to the grievances, demands, and aspirations of the people of India and its unrepresented millions before the bar of public opinion in Great Britain and Ireland. This journal will endeavour to inculcate the great sociological truth that "it is impossible to join injustice and brutality abroad with justice and humanity at home." It will from time to time remind the British people that they can never succeed in being a nation of freedom and lovers of freedom so long as they continue to send out members of the dominant classes to exercise despotisms in Britain's name upon the various conquered races that constitute Britain's military empire. The Indian Sociologist will not be identified with any political party. It will be guided in its policy by the fundamental truths of social science, the first principle of which is that "every man has freedom to do all that he wills, provided he infringes not the freedom of any other man". In discussing political, social, and religious questions, we shall frequently appeal to sociology, which, as expounded by the founder of that new and profound science, proves conclusively that "all despotisms, whether political or religious, whether of sex, of caste, or of custom, may be generalised as limitations to individuality, which it is the nature of civilisation to remove."

The journal also featured two quotes from Herbert Spencer, an important influence on it:

"Every man is free to do that which he wills, provided he infringes not the equal freedom of any other man." (Principles of Ethics, Section 272).
"Resistance to aggression is not simply justifiable but imperative. Non-resistance hurts both altruism and egoism" (The Study of Sociology, Chapter 8)

The journal was very strongly influenced by Spencer and Krishnavarma used it to advertise the Herbert Spencer Indian Fellowships, five travelling scholarships he set up to enable Indian graduates to study in England. They had the prevision that the fellowship holder "shall not accept any post, office, emoluments, or service under the British government after his return to India", a condition which caused some debate.

The journal became a significant conduit for the ideas of Herbet Spencer across India.

== 1907: radicalisation and repression ==
Banner of the Vol. V, No. 8 of The Indian Sociologist published in August 1909, for which Guy Aldred was prosecuted

Starting with quite a mild stance in that "India and England should sever their connection peaceably and part as friends", it became more radical in 1907, actively advocating Swaraj (Home Rule) and organisation of the Society of Political Missionaries of India. This incurred police surveillance, a debate in the British House of Commons (30 July 1907) and a ban on import and sale of the journal in India from 19 September 1907. Krishnavarma had already departed in June 1907, remarking in the September issue: "On the earnest advice of some of our friends, we left England, practically for good, during the early part of June last, seeing that mischief was brewing". It was not banned in England and continued to be printed there.

However, two of the printers were arrested for sedition for printing it in 1909. Arthur Fletcher Horsley was arrested for printing seditious material and tried for printing the May, June and July issues. He was tried and sentenced on the same day as Madan Lal Dhingra for the assassination of William Hutt Curzon Wyllie. The trial was very prominent, with the remarks by the Lord Chief Justice to indicate anyone printing this sort of material would be liable for prosecution. Nevertheless, Guy Aldred, a 22-year-old anarchist advocate of the Freedom of the press, published it through his Bakunin Press, supplemented with his own comments. The police obtained a warrant and seized 396 copies of the issue. At the trial, the prosecution was led by William Robson, Baron Robson, the Attorney General at the Central Criminal Court. Robson highlighted parts of the journal which Aldred had himself written, particularly focusing on a passage which touched on the execution of Dhingra:

In the execution of Dhingra that cloak will be publicly worn, that secret language spoken, that solemn veil employed to conceal the sword of Imperialism by which we are sacrificed to the insatiable idol of modern despotism, whose ministers are Cromer, Curzon and Morley & Co. Murder-which they would represent to us as a horrible crime, when the murdered is a government flunkey- we see practised by them without repugnance or remorse when the murdered is a working man, a Nationalist patriot, an Egyptian fellaheen or half-starved victim of despotic society's bloodlust. It was so at Featherstone and Denshawai; it has often been so at Newgate: and it was so with Robert Emmett, the Paris communards, and the Chicago martyrs. Who is more reprehensible than the murderers of these martyrs? The police spies who threw the bomb at Chicago; the ad hoc tribunal which murdered innocent Egyptians at Denshawai; the Asquith who assumed full responsibility for the murder of the workers at Feathersone; the assassins of Robert Emmett? Yet these murderers have not been executed! Why then should Dhingra be executed? Because he is not a time serving executioner, but a Nationalist patriot, who, though his ideals are not their ideals, is worthy of the admiration of those workers at home, who have as little to gain from the lick-spittle crew of Imperialistic blood-sucking, capitalist parasites at as what the Nationalists have in India.

Aldred also remarked that the Sepoy Mutiny, or Indian Mutiny, would be described as the Indian War of Independence. Aldred received a sentence of twelve months hard labour.
