= Free India Society =

Indian student organization in England

The Free India Society was an organization of Indian students in London, founded by Vinayak Damodar Savarkar in 1906, who drew inspiration from the thoughts of Italian nationalist Giuseppe Mazzini. The Society was committed to promoting the cause of Indian independence from the British Raj. It functioned effectively as the London branch of the Abhinav Bharat Society.

== History and activities ==
The Free India Society was founded by Vinayak Damodar Savarkar, drawing inspiration from the thoughts of Italian nationalist Giuseppe Mazzini. It was established in 1906 in London by Savarkar and his associates as a counterpart to the Abhinav Bharat Society established earlier in Pune. Envisioned as a nationalist organisation, it soon became a centre for political activism among Indian nationalist students residing in London. The Society invited prominent nationalist leaders from India and organised lectures and interactive sessions. In addition to nationalist meetings, the Society also celebrated Indian cultural festivals and commemorated prominent figures of the Indian freedom struggle. Among its notable members and revolutionaries were Bhai Parmanand, Pandurang Mahadev Bapat, Madan Lal Dhingra, Har Dayal, and Harnam Singh. The Free India Society also functioned as a recruiting ground for the Abhinav Bharat Society in London, where Savarkar organised Indian students. Among those who were attracted to his ideological visions also included Madam Cama.

In 1907, Shyamji Krishna Varma, the founder of India House and Indian Home Rule Society, entrusted the management of India House to Savarkar, having developed a paternal affection for him. After Savarkar took charge of India House, the Society became increasingly active, hosting frequent debates and discourses. V. V. S. Aiyar was Savarkar's chief aide during this period. The Society gradually replaced the Indian Home Rule Society and functioned effectively as the London branch of the Abhinav Bharat Society. Savarkar often read passages from his book The Indian War of Independence during its meetings, using it as a tool for political education and motivation. By late 1908, the Society's activities increased significantly. Prominent Indian nationalists such as Lala Lajpat Rai, Gokul Chand Narang, B. P. Pal, Gopal Krishna Gokhale, Romesh Chunder Dutt, G. B. Khaparde, and R. V. Karandikar visited London and participated in events organised by the Society, where they presented their views before the British public. In July 1909, one of its member, Madan Lal Dhingra, assassinated Curzon Wyllie, a senior British official associated with the India Office. The act, reportedly inspired by Savarkar's revolutionary philosophy, led to Dhingra's arrest, trial, and death sentence.
