= Names of the Indian Rebellion of 1857 =

Naming controversy regarding the Indian Rebellion of 1857

The Indian Rebellion of 1857 has been variously termed as a war of independence, a rebellion, and a mutiny. Several Indian writers, who consider it as a part of the Indian independence movement that ultimately led to the country's independence in 1947, have termed it as "The First War of Independence", the "great revolution", the "great rebellion", and the "Indian freedom struggle". Several British writers, who view it as a military disturbance, have termed it as "sepoy revolt", "sepoy war", "Indian rebellion", and the "great revolt". Since the 19th century, a section of British writers have challenged the choice of the word "mutiny" to describe the events.

== British nomenclature ==
The British and colonial press, along with contemporary Europeans, referred to the events under a number of titles, the most common being the Sepoy Mutiny and the Indian Mutiny. Contemporary anti-imperialists viewed those terms as propaganda and pushed to characterise the uprising as more than just the actions of mutinous native soldiers. At the time, they used the term Indian Insurrection in the British and colonial press. Karl Marx was the first Western scholar to call the events of 1857 a "national revolt", although he used the term Sepoy Revolt to describe them.

== Indian nomenclature ==
Vinayak Damodar Savarkar first used the term War of Independence to describe the 1857 uprising in his 1909 book The History of the War of Indian Independence, which was originally written in Marathi. However, Savarkar did not use the word "first" in his original book. The word "first" appeared first in an edition of Savarkar's book that was published in 1945 in Kuala Lumpur during the Japanese occupation. The edition, titled The Volcano, or The First War of Indian Independence, was published by the Indian National Army (INA) and the Japanese Ministry of Propaganda. Although Karl Marx never used the term "war of independence" to describe the events of 1857–1859, a volume containing Karl Marx's New York Tribune articles on the topic was published in 1959 in Moscow under the title The First Indian War of Independence 1857–1859. This English-language volume was based on a Russian-language edition, whose title does not include the word "first" either. It is possible that the title of the Russian edition was inspired by Savarkar's book, although some later writers wrongly state that the term was coined by Karl Marx.

Jawaharlal Nehru, the first Prime Minister of India, insisted on using the term First War of Independence to refer to the events of 1857–1859, and the terminology was adopted by the Government of India.

Some South Indian historians have opposed the use of the term First War of Independence by the Government to describe the 1857 uprising, and have unsuccessfully taken the issue to the court. These historians insist that several other anti-British uprisings in South India, such as the Vellore Mutiny in 1806, had preceded the 1857 revolt and should be called the First War of Indian Independence. In 2006, when the Indian postal department issued a postal stamp to commemorate the Vellore Mutiny of 1806, M. Karunanidhi, the former Chief Minister of Tamil Nadu, said that the move had given "due recognition" to India's "first war of independence".

Some Sikh groups have also opposed the use of the term. They insist that the First Anglo-Sikh War (1845–46) should be called the First War of Independence instead, although other localised wars against the British had taken place previously, such as the First Anglo-Maratha War and the First Anglo-Mysore War. Nonetheless, in May 2007, the Lok Sabha Deputy Speaker Charanjit Singh Atwal and three other MPs from Punjab protested against the commemoration of the 150th anniversary of the 1857 revolt over this issue.

Some Indian writers also insist that none of the armed uprisings against the British in India, including the 1857 uprising, should be termed as a "war of independence" since they were neither national in nature nor motivated mainly by nationalist sentiment and in fact involved only a minority of people or soldiers.
