= Pandurang Mahadev Bapat =

Indian revolutionary (1880–1967)

Senapati सेनापती Pandurang Mahadev Bapat
- पांडुरंग महादेव बापट
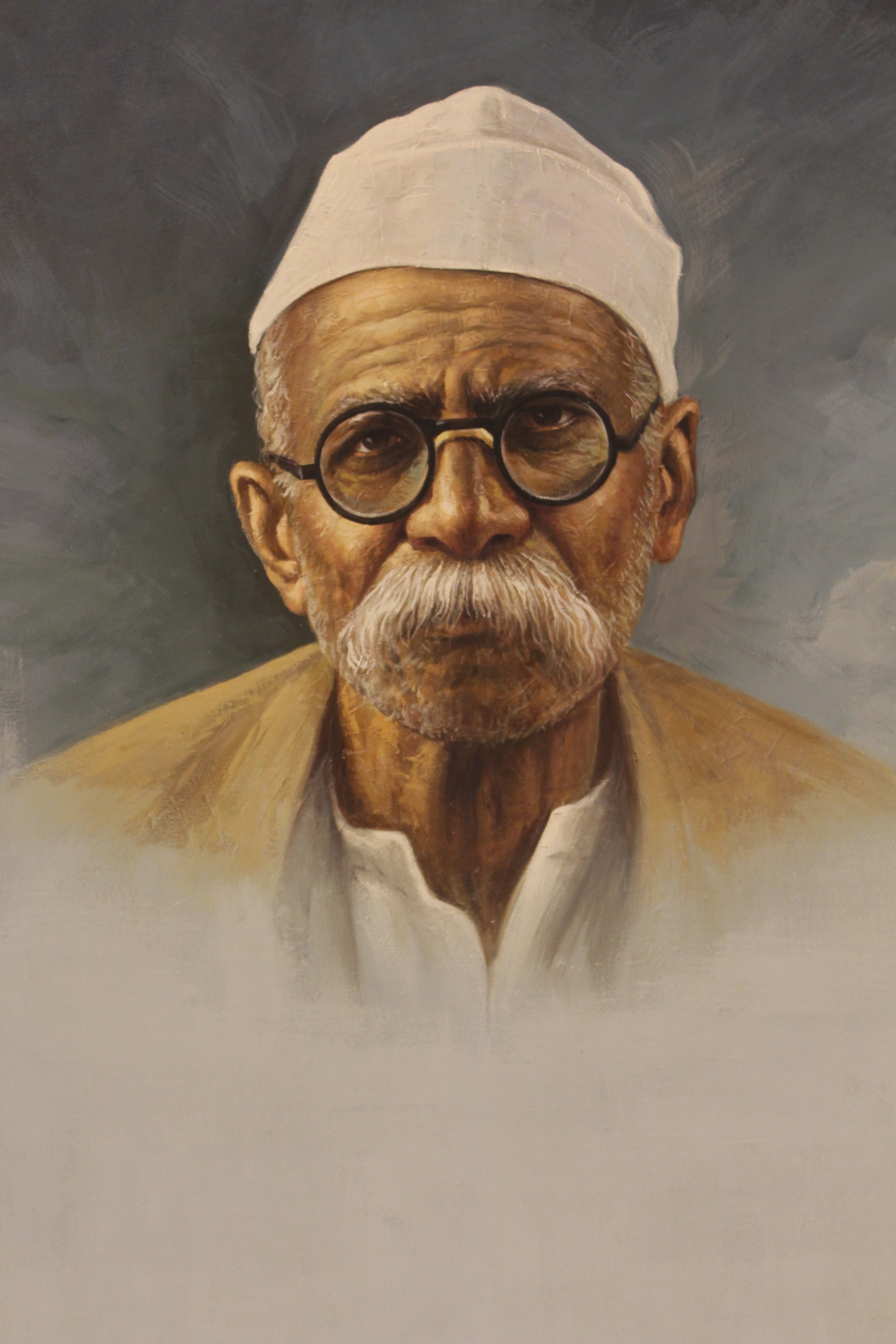
- Portrait of Senapati Bapat at Samyukta Maharashtra Smruti Dalan, Dadar, Mumbai.
- Pronunciation: pɑ̃ːɖuɾə̃gə məɦɑːd̪eːʋə bɑːpəʈ
- Born: 12 November 1880; Parner, British India
- Died: 28 November 1967 (aged 87); Mumbai, Maharashtra, India
- Other name: Senapati Bapat
- Education: Deccan College, University of Pune
- Occupations: Freedom fighter, politician, social worker
- Known for: Gandhian philosophy
- Movement: • Indian Independence Movement • Samyukta Maharashtra Movement

Pandurang Mahadev Bapat
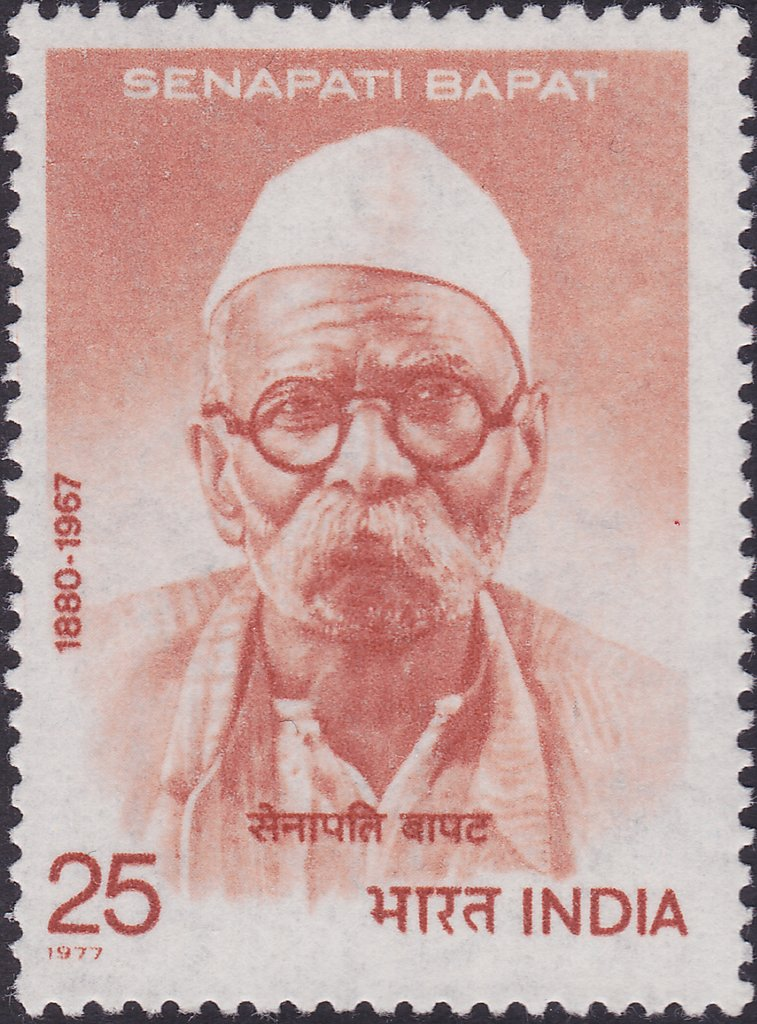
- A commemorative postage stamp on SENAPATI BAPAT (1880–1967) issued by Department of Posts, Government of India on 28 Nov 1977.
- Country of issue: India
- Date of issue: 28 November 1977
- Face value: 25 nP

Pandurang Mahadev Bapat (12 November 1880 – 28 November 1967), popularly known as Senapati Bapat, was a figure in the Indian independence movement. He acquired the title of Senapati, meaning commander, as a consequence of his leadership during the Mulshi Satyagraha. In 1977, the Indian government issued a postage stamp to commemorate him. He participated in various movements and agitations, such as the Samyukt Maharashtra movement, the Goa Liberation movement, the Hyderabad liberation movement and the Maharashtra-Mysore border agitation.

== Early life and education ==
Senapati Bapat was born in a Marathi Chitpawan Brahmin family on 12 November 1880 in Parner. His family was originally from Ratnagiri. He was educated at Deccan College and then travelled to Britain on a government scholarship in order to study engineering.

== As a revolutionary ==
During his stay in Britain, he was associated with India House, spending a majority of his time learning bomb-making skills instead of pursuing his official studies. He became associated at this time with the Savarkar brothers, Vinayak and Ganesh and also with Hemchandra Kanungo from Bengal. Bapat, who had considered blowing up the Houses of Parliament in London, took his skills back to India and passed them on to others. (Note: A revolutionary from Russia passed a bomb-making manual on to Bapat in 1908 and this was translated by another Russian prior to duplicate copies being made by the Free India Society in London for distribution in India.)

While in hiding after the Alipore bombing of 1908, Bapat travelled the country and discovered that the majority of the Indian population did not realize that their country was under foreign rule. At this point, his focus shifted from overthrowing the British government to educating the population. In 1912, he was arrested in connection with the bombing and was sentenced to be imprisoned. He was free by 1915, and was a "seasoned revolutionary", according to Richard Cashman. He had joined the staff of Mahratta and was one of several influential figures from the Poona area who were aligned with Bal Gangadhar Tilak's attempts to establish local organisations supporting the cause of Indian independence.

== Shift to Gandhian Philosophy ==
He re-aligned himself with Gandhi's vision of Swaraj in late 1920 following the death of Bal Gangadhar Tilak, despite having been a fervent supporter of the Tilak's vision. This was a considerable shift, given his firebrand nature and willingness to use violence, but although he took the Gandhian oath of non-violence he remained willing to use force when he thought it necessary.

From 1921, Bapat led the three-year farmers' protest (satyagraha) against the construction of the Mulshi Dam by the Tata company. Ghanshyam Shah considers this to be "the first recorded organised struggle against [forced] displacement" caused by an irrigation project. The company had initially dug test trenches on land without obtaining permission and the farmers, who were mostly tenants, objected in fear of losing their lands. The dam was eventually constructed and thus the protest ultimately failed. Compensation for lands submersed by the dam's construction was eventually arranged but was given to the landlords rather than to the tenants. Although satyagrahas are intended to be non-violent, Bapat was jailed for vandalism of the construction project: rather than be captured for this, he turned himself in. His third jail sentence was for speaking at a public gathering held by Subhash Chandra Bose.

== Legacy ==
Major public roads in Pune and Mumbai have been named in his honour, and he featured in issue 303 of the Amar Chitra Katha comic book series in 1984. In 1977, the Government of India issued a postage stamp to commemorate him.

On 15 August 1947 — Indian Independence Day — Bapat was given the honour of raising the Indian national flag over the city of Poona for the first time. Bapat memorial was built at the site of the Mulshi satyagraha on his birth centenary in 1980.
