= Nanegaon =

Village in Maharashtra

- Village
- Nickname: Nanegaon
- Location in Maharashtra, India
- Coordinates: 19.951°N 73.834°E
- Country: India
- State: Maharashtra
- District: Nashik
- Elevation: 515 m (1,690 ft)

Population (2001)
  - Total: 3,667

Languages
  - Official: Marathi
- Time zone: UTC+5:30 (IST)
- Postal code: 422502

Nanegaon [d̪eːwɭaːli], is a village in Nashik district, Maharashtra, India.

Nearby villages include Deolali, Belatgavhan, Bhagur, Sansari, Lahvit, Vihitgaon.

== Industry ==
Nanegaon has Nashik Sugar Factory on east, famous food company Parle Products have their plant in Nanegaon, where 20-20 cookies are manufactured. Riverine is a well-known company; it has its only plant in Nanegaon. Nanegaon is on the banks on Darna River and is known for very old Maruti (Hanuman Temple) and new Shiv Temple. The main occupation for Nanegaon is Agriculture. Here the main crops include vegetables, Grapes, along with flowers and poultry farms for eggs.
