= Swatantrya Veer Savarkar (film) =

2024 Indian film by Randeep Hooda

- Theatrical release poster
- Directed by: Randeep Hooda
- Written by: Utkarsh Naithani; Randeep Hooda
- Produced by: Anand Pandit; Sandeep Singh; Yogesh Rahar; Randeep Hooda
- Starring: Randeep Hooda; Ankita Lokhande; Amit Sial
- Cinematography: Arvind Krishna
- Edited by: Kamlesh Karna; Rajesh G. Pandey
- Music by: Songs: Anu Malik; Vipin Patwa; Sambata; Score: Mathias Duplessy; Sandesh Shandilya
- Production companies: Zee Studios; Anand Pandit Motion Pictures; Legend Studios; Avak Films; Randeep Hooda Films
- Distributed by: Zee Studios
- Release date: 22 March 2024
- Running time: 178 minutes
- Country: India
- Language: Hindi
- Budget: ₹20 crore
- Box office: ₹31.23 crore

Swatantrya Veer Savarkar is a 2024 Indian Hindi-language biographical drama film on the life of Vinayak Damodar Savarkar, directed, co-written, and co-produced by Randeep Hooda, who also plays the titular role of Savarkar. It was released in theatres on 22 March 2024. The film is written by Utkarsh Naithani.

The film presents a detailed biographical sketch of Savarkar from his childhood, including the key events from his life. It received praises for its actors' performances.

== Plot ==
The film narrates the life of Vinayak Damodar Savarkar, beginning with the backdrop of the Bubonic plague of 1897, which claims his father's life. Angered by injustices, Vinayak becomes a revolutionary, inspired by figures like Chhatrapati Shivaji Maharaj and Mazzini. He founds the secret society Abhinav Bharat Society and later joins Indian revolutionaries in London at the India House. Vinayak completes his thesis on the 1857 War of Independence, and secretly dispatches weapons to India. He meets Mahatma Gandhi but finds their approaches different. As India witnesses various revolutionary acts, the Savarkar brothers—Vinayak and Ganesh Damodar Savarkar —are arrested, and imprisonend in the infamous Kalapani in Andaman.

In prison, the Savarkar brothers face brutal treatment, including solitary confinement and physical abuse. Despite hardships, Vinayak continues his struggle, advocating for better conditions for political prisoners. After years of imprisonment, Vinayak is released but faces restrictions. He coins the term Hindutva and continues his activism, challenging casteism and advocating for a united India. He refuses to support Gandhi's Quit India Movement. Fearing partition, he urges Hindus to prepare for military defence. As India moves towards independence, the film delves on the partition, the Naval Mutiny, and Gandhi's assassination. The movie concludes in 1950 with Savarkar being imprisoned due to concerns over a potential bomb blast during Pakistani Prime Minister Liaquat Ali Khan's visit to India.

== Cast ==
- Randeep Hooda as Vinayak Damodar Savarkar
  - Varun Buddhadev as young Vinayak Damodar Savarkar
- Ankita Lokhande as Yamunabai Savarkar
- Amit Sial as Ganesh Damodar Savarkar
- Apinderdeep Singh as Harnam Singh Saini
- Tirrtha Murbaadkar as Saraswatibai Savarkar
- Chetan Swaroop as Narayan Damodar Savarkar
- Rajesh Khera as Mahatma Gandhi
- Lokesh Mittal as B. R. Ambedkar
- Brajesh Jha as Subhash Chandra Bose
- Santosh Ojha as Bal Gangadhar Tilak
- Rahul Kulkarni as Gopal Krishna Gokhale
- Sanjay Sharma as Jawaharlal Nehru
- Mrinal Dutt as Madan Lal Dhingra
- Anjali Hooda as Bhikaiji Cama
- Jay Patel as Shyamji Krishna Varma
- Chirag Pandya as Nathuram Godse
- Balkrishna Mishra as Dadabhai Naoroji
- Bhushan S.R. as Vasudev Chapekar
- Nitesh Thakur as Lala Har Dayal
- Palle Singh as Mirza Khan
- Aamir Malek as Bhagat Singh
- Gary John as King George VI
- James Murphy as Winston Churchill
- Sal Yusuf as Clement Attlee
- Ryan Walters as Lord Mountbatten
- Hella Stichlmair as Edwina Mountbatten
- Richard B. Klein as Curzon Wyllie
- Mark Bennington as Reginald Craddock
- Russell Geoffrey Banks as David Barry
- Ashwin Dhar as Muhammad Ali Jinnah

== Production ==
Mahesh Manjrekar was initially signed to direct the film, but opted out citing creative difference with Randeep Hooda over the script and inclusion of irrelevant historical figures and events, and was subsequently replaced by Hooda himself, marking his directorial debut.

== Music ==
Swatantrya Veer Savarkar

Soundtrack album by Anu Malik, Vipin Patwa and Sambata
- Released: 14 March 2024
- Recorded: 2022
- Genre: Feature film soundtrack
- Length: 21:02
- Language: Hindi
- Label: Zee Music Company

Official audio
- Swatantrya Veer Savarkar- Full Album on YouTube

The music of the film is composed by Anu Malik, Vipin Patwa and Sambata while the background score is composed by Mathias Duplessy and Sandesh Shandilya.

Track listing
No.	Title	Lyrics	Music	Singer(s)	Length
1.	"Dharti Ka Abhimaan"	Traditional	Anu Malik	Divya Kumar, Vijay Prakash	3:44
2.	"Dariya O Dariya"	Prashant Ingole	Anu Malik	Raj Barman	4:33
3.	"The Savarkar Rage"	Sambata	Sambata	Sambata	2:10
4.	"Vande Mataram"	Dr. Sagar	Vipin Patwa	Vipin Patwa	2:53
5.	"Dharti Ka Abhimaan" (Extended Version)	Traditional	Anu Malik	Divya Kumar, Vijay Prakash	7:42
Total length:					21:02

== Release ==
=== Theatrical release ===
The film was theatrically released on 22 March 2024 in Hindi, along with Marathi dubbed version.

=== Home video ===
The home video rights were retained by ZEE Entertainment for their own streaming platform ZEE5. The film was premiered on ZEE5 from 28 May 2024 to mark the 141st birthday of Veer Savarkar.

=== Marketing ===
Little Chanakya and Swatantra Veer Savarkar, a comic book tie-in was released along with the film by Diamond Comics. The comic character Little Chanakya discusses Savarkar's life story covering his participation in the Indian independence movement, imprisonment in Kalapani, social activism, Opposition to the Partition of India and role in the Goa liberation movement.

== Reception ==
=== Box office ===
The movie earned ₹11.37 nett crore in India its first week. In second week, the movie earned ₹6.34 nett crore. As of 14 April 2024, the film has a worldwide gross of ₹31.23 crore.

=== Critical response ===
On the review aggregator website Rotten Tomatoes, the film holds an approval rating of 14% based on critic reviews. Conversely, general audience reception was highly positive, with the film securing a 91% audience approval score.

Catherine Bray of The Guardian gave the film 2 out of 5 stars and stated, "It all adds up to a funny mixture of hagiography and limp film-making, albeit built around a fine central performance." Anuj Kumar of The Hindu wrote "The film attempts to uplift Savarkar in the popular imagination by vilifying Gandhi through a stylistically mounted and carefully crafted narrative." In the review for The Indian Express, Shubhra Gupta gave a rating of 2/5 and described the movie as "stridently one-sided, and, ultimately, reductive."

Rohit Bhatnagar of Free Press Journal gave a rating of 2.5/5 and wrote "Randeep’s film is a slow burner and it drains you with facts and figures but it is a well-intended project that might strictly excite and appeal history lovers." The review finds the movie to be "bothersome" and to have distorted historical realities. Sana Farzeen of India Today rated 2 out of 5 stars and added that "Swatantrya Veer Savarkar turned out to be a shallow attempt. It can be only passed off as a very long, often one-sided history lesson on the 'neglected' freedom fighter."

Monika Rawal Kukreja of Hindustan Times writes in her review that the film "ends up being a one-sided narrative that's not bothered about presenting a balanced outlook about the contributions made towards India's struggle for freedom. Prateek Sur of the Outlook gave 2.5/5 stars and stated that, "'Swatantrya Veer Savarkar' is a wasted effort to be honest. The performances of the other characters could have been lifted and given much more weightage than it currently got. Not to forget that its already too long and yet you feel that there are many angles that have been missed out. So, a possibility of having the film releasing two parts or probably as a web series would have been better."

Nandini Ramnath of the Scroll says in her review, "Swatantrya Veer Savarkar arrives as election season is starting off, making it high-value, slickly produced propaganda. Savarkar’s heavily simplified Hindutva beliefs link the film most immediately to the present. Savarkar speaks of the legitimacy of the “pain of a majority” that has been oppressed for centuries." She adds, "When Nathuram Godse, shown in the movie as a Hindu Mahasabha member, guns down Gandhi, Savarkar is remorseful. It’s the only moment of weakness in a narrative that proudly owns its ideological stance."

On the other side of the line, the Times of India called it, "A polarising but powerful biopic that vindicates Savarkar," and rated it 3.5 out of 5. Rishil Jogani of Pinkvilla rated the film 4/5 and opined that "The life decisions of Vinayak Damodar Savarkar can have polarising views, but not the film, that can be classified as 'peak cinema'. While one can't claim authenticity of everything shown in the film, this interpretation of Savarkar's life by Randeep Hooda and the team of Swatantrya Veer Savarkar makes for great, engaging cinema." Filmfare rated it 3 out 5 and stated, "Swatantrya Veer Savarkar movie review: Randeep Hooda packs an impeccable punch in this hard-hitting & eye-opening biographical drama."

Dishya Sharma of News 18 rated the film 3 out of 5 stars and wrote "In a sea of patriotic films that Bollywood has been releasing in recent years, Swatantra Veer Savarkar is among the better ones. The production value of the film and the performances keep you seated through the three-hour watch. I wish it was edited well, for there were a few scenes that could have been done away with. This would have given the film a lasting impact." Firstpost in its review comments, "Randeep Hooda goes into the detailing of the story and makes sure to showcase the tiniest events of Savarkar’s life." It went on to rate the film 3 out of 5.
