= Essentials of Hindutva =

1923 political pamphlet by Vinayak Damodar Savarkar

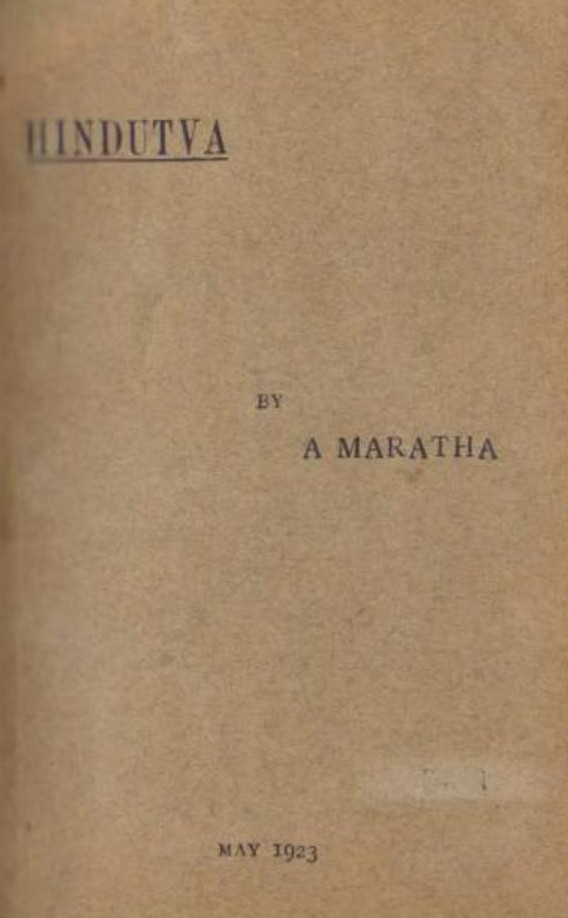
- Title page of the 1923 edition
- Author: Vinayak Damodar Savarkar
- Language: English
- Subject: Hindutva
- Genre: Political manifesto Political philosophy
- Publication date: May 1923
- Publication place: British India
- Media type: Print (hardcover and paperback)
- Pages: 88 (original publication); 141 (1969 publication)
- ISBN: 9788188388257 (2003 publication)
- OCLC: 0670049905

Essentials of Hindutva, also titled Hindutva: Who is a Hindu? or simply Hindutva, is a 1923 political pamphlet by Indian politician and ideologue Vinayak Damodar Savarkar. It was published pseudonymously while Savarkar was in prison. Savarkar's pamphlet formulated Hindutva, a Hindu nationalist ideology.

== Background ==
=== Prior usage of the term "Hindutva" ===
The term "Hindutva" was originally coined by Chandranath Basu, a conservative essayist, who used it to denote a Hindu cultural worldview rather than a political ideology. He discussed the term in a Bengali book entitled Hindutva: Hindur Prakrita Itihas (transl. Hindutva: The Authentic History of the Hindus), published in 1892. In the book, Basu distances himself from Hindu mythology in favour of Advaita Vedanta, argues for the centrality of dharma in Hinduism, glorifies the ancient "land of the Hindus", defends the caste system and child marriage, critiques European modernity, and calls for greater "manliness" to counter what he perceives as rising effeminacy.

=== Socio-political context behind Essentials of Hindutva ===
Following World War I, South Asian Muslims launched the Khilafat Movement across British India in opposition to the planned dismemberment of the Ottoman Empire. Its alliance with the Indian National Congress, however, collapsed after Mahatma Gandhi's withdrawal of the non-cooperation movement in 1922, heightening communal tensions and polarisation between Hindus and Muslims. Among sections of the Hindu intelligentsia, there emerged a majoritarian inferiority complex, partly rooted in a loss of self-esteem fostered by a 19th century colonial stereotype that portrayed Hindus as a "puny race". The same period witnessed B. R. Ambedkar's first organisation of Dalits as an anti-Brahmin movement in the Bombay Presidency; on the other hand, caste and sectarian divisions within Hinduism came to be obsessively viewed in Hindu nationalist discourse as weaknesses. Meanwhile, the proportion of Hindus in British India, as recorded in the decennial census, fell from 74% in 1881 to 68% in 1931, prompting some Hindu nationalist ideologues to describe Hindus as a "dying race". (Note: One prominent example was in 1909, when U. N. Mukherji published a series of articles from The Bengalee as a pamphlet entitled Hindus: A Dying Race. Based on census data, Mukherji claims that the Hindu population of Bengal will disappear completely, and that extrapolating demographic trends, Hindus will go numerically extinct within 420 years. He speaks of a "united Mahomedan world", drawing on exaggerated stereotypes of Muslim communal unity, which he contrasts with Hindus who, according to him, are "crumbling to pieces" due to caste and class conflict. He states, "Disunion is the cornerstone of our community".) (Note: Furthermore, the notion of Hindus being a "dying race" was exploited by the British for their colonial policy of "divide and conquer".) It was in this socio-political context that Essentials of Hindutva was written.

=== Savarkar and publication ===
In 1910, Vinayak Damodar Savarkar was arrested in London on multiple criminal charges, including the procurement and distribution of arms, abetment of murder, "waging war against the King Emperor of India", and sedition; extradited to Bombay to stand trial, he was convicted and sentenced to serve two life terms in Cellular Jail in the Andaman Islands. After submitting a series of clemency petitions, he was transferred to a prison in Ratnagiri, where he remained until his conditional release in 1924. During his imprisonment, he wrote Essentials of Hindutva, under the pseudonym 'A Maratha'. (Note: Also spelled as 'A Mahratta'.) In May 1923, the pamphlet was smuggled out of his cell and delivered to V. V. Kelkar, who subsequently published it. The pamphlet was written and published in English, comprising just eighty-eight pages.

== Titles and editions ==
There is little agreement on the title of the pamphlet. The original 1923 publication simply states "Hindutva by 'A Maratha', May 1923" on the title page, while the first page is entitled Essentials of Hindutva; this was not a chapter title, as this edition had none. A 1938 edition retains the 1923 title but now names Savarkar as the author and includes a portrait of him. In that edition, however, the opening pages feature a Sanskrit epigraph with an English translation, entitled Who is a Hindu?. (Note: A foreword is included in the same edition by Bhai Parmanand who refers to the pamphlet simply as Hindutva, using neither of the other two titles.) The sixth edition in 1989 retains Hindutva on the dust jacket and Hindutva: Who is a Hindu? on the title page, yet the first page reverts to Essentials of Hindutva; this edition also includes chapter titles and subheadings. The running heads add further inconsistency, with Hindutva appearing on the verso and Essentials of Hindutva on the recto. The 2007 edition is simply entitled Essentials of Hindutva. The Marathi and Hindi translations follow a similar pattern, with both dust jackets entitled Hindutva, while the first page of each carries a translation of Essentials of Hindutva as a subtitle. (Note: The Marathi translation is Hindutvaci Mulabhuta Tattve and the Hindi translation is Hindutva ke Pramukhatam Abhilakshan.) All three titles have been used in scholarly analysis.

== Themes ==
=== Racial and ethnic Hindu identity ===
In Essentials of Hindutva, Savarkar racialises and ethnicises an imagined Hindu identity, and argues for the creation of a Hindu Rashtra (transl. Hindu nation). His criteria for being considered a Hindu is inclusive across caste, creed, and faith; any person for whom India is both pitrabhumi (transl. Ancestral land) and punyabhumi (transl. Sacred land) qualifies as a Hindu. However, he frames punyabhumi more so in patriotic and cultural terms rather than solely religious ones, with patriotism expressed through his notion of martyrdom, envisioned as heroism and hero worship. He also forms clear boundaries between those deemed Hindus and non-Hindus, advocating for the purification of the nation from those deemed outsiders, such as Muslims and Christians, who, according to Savarkar, have their sacred lands outside of India, in "Arabia or Palestine"; in the pamphlet, they are portrayed as "impure" and incompatible with Indian society. However, he does not explicitly argue for strict racial purity; he contends that Hindus who had converted to Islam or Christianity may be readmitted if they convert back to Hinduism as well as marry and have children with Hindus, thereby being welcomed back to the "Hindu fold".

Some of us were Aryans and some Anaryans; but Ayars and Nayars—we were all Hindus and own a common blood. Some of us are Brahmins and some Namshudras or Panchams; but Brahmins or Chandals—we are all Hindus and own a common blood. Some of us are Dakshanatyas and some Gouds; but Gouds or Saraswats—we are all Hindus and own a common blood. Some of us were Vanars and some Kinners: but Vanars or Nars—we are all Hindus and own a common blood. Some of us are monists some pantheists; some theists and some atheists. But monotheists or atheists—we are all Hindus and own a common blood.

Articulating a militantly chauvinistic and nativist form of racial and territorial nationhood, Savarkar argues that Hindus constitute a distinct and primordial civilisation and stresses Hindu devotion to common ethnic ties, rooted in the ideals of sacred blood and sacred soil. He blends Hindu ethnic nationalism with Brahminical authority in the caste system; his emphasis on race was an attempt to downplay caste divisions that he, as a Brahmin, sought to preserve. Appealing to the imagined racial unity, racial oneness, and racial superiority of the Hindus, Savarkar attacks the British conception of castes being racially differentiated, yet argues for the defence of a caste system which was barely distinguishable, founded on a hierarchically conceived notion of noble and pure upper-caste blood. His over-integrated conception of an imagined Hindu race was both formed against, and mirrored, the racial supremacism of British colonialism; he repeatedly asserts that the racial inheritance of Hindu blood is the defining characteristic of Hindutva.

==== Distinction between Hinduism and Hindutva ====
Savarkar contrasts Hinduism, which he describes as merely a "spiritual or religious dogma or system", with the term "Hindutva" (transl. Hindu-ness), which, he writes, "embraces all the departments of thought and activity of the whole being of our Hindu race". He characterises Hinduism as "limited, less satisfactory and essentially sectarian", arguing that it is only one of several aspects of Hindutva. Later in the pamphlet, he states, "if there be really any word of alien growth it is this word Hinduism and so we should not allow our thoughts to get confused by this new-fangled term". (Note: Savarkar has variously been described as an agnostic and an atheist. He rejected Hindu mysticism, the divinity of Hindu religious scriptures, the theory of rebirth, and idolatry. He attacked Hindu customs and practices as a "backward" past in contrast to a "scientific" present. Nevertheless, he regularly utilised religious language for political purposes.)

=== History ===
In the pamphlet, Savarkar frames history as the means of understanding Hindutva, stating, "Hindutva is not a word but a history"; not a "spiritual or religious history", he adds, but "a history in full".

=== Global Hindu colonialism ===
This definition of Hindutva is compatible with any conceivable expansion of our Hindu people. Let our colonists continue unabated their labours of founding a Greater India, a Mahabharata, to the best of their capacities and contribute all that is best in our civilization to the upbuilding of humanity [...] The only geographical limits to Hindutva are the limits of our earth!

Savarkar argues that the hundreds of thousands of Hindus who had reached distant parts of the world as merchants and traders were colonisers, with the potential to "own a whole country" and "form a separate state". He contends that the process of Hindu colonisation would improve lives on a global scale or, as he puts it, "from Pole to Pole". In his view, Hindus needed not only to unify territorially, a notion that later evolved into the concept of Akhand Bharat, but to colonise parts of the planet in order to establish a Hindu world empire. Throughout the pamphlet, he uses the terms "Hindu nation" and "Hindu empire" interchangeably.

=== Conflict of life and death ===
Savarkar wrote that a "conflict of life and death" had ensued ever since Mahmud of Ghazni of the Ghaznavid Empire crossed the Indus River into the Indian subcontinent in 11th century CE, and that this prolonged conflict made Hindus "intensely conscious of ourselves as Hindus and were welded into a nation".

=== Western and orientalist influence ===
Savarkar's conception of Hindutva drew heavily on British and German orientalist thought as well as on contemporary currents of ethnic nationalism in Europe. He was well acquainted with the works of Charles Darwin, Herbert Spencer, Ernst Haeckel, and Thomas Henry Huxley, and supported racial theory. He was particularly influenced by Johann Kaspar Bluntschli's concept of German ethnic and racial nationalism. (Note: While imprisoned, Savarkar read and taught Bluntschli's works. Bluntschli distinguished between a racially superior "principal nation" and a racially inferior "alien nation". This framework appealed to Savarkar, as it allowed him to compensate the British claims of racial superiority, by asserting the racial superiority of an imagined Hindu race against an imagined Muslim race. Adopting Bluntschli's model, Savarkar argued that Hindus constituted the principal nation, while Muslims constituted the alien nation.) Philosopher Martha Nussbaum has described the pamphlet as a "European product".
