= Veer Savarkar (film) =

- Directed by: Ved Rahi
- Written by: Ved Rahi
- Produced by: Sudhir Phadke
- Starring: Shailendra Gaur; Pankaj Berry; Tom Alter; Hemant Birje; Rohitash Gaud
- Cinematography: Sameer Athalye
- Music by: Sudhir Phadke
- Production company: Savarkar Darshan Prathisthan
- Release date: 16 November 2001
- Running time: 165 minutes
- Country: India
- Language: Hindi

Veer Savarkar is a 2001 Indian Hindi-language biopic film based on the life of Vinayak Damodar Savarkar. This version was released on DVD format. This film was produced by Savarkar Darshan Prathisthan, with the help of Sudhir Phadke. It was premiered on 16 November 2001, in Mumbai, New Delhi, Nagpur and six other Indian cities. On 28 May 2012 its Gujarati language version was released by then Chief Minister of Gujarat, Narendra Modi.

The film was screened retrospective on 13 August 2016, at the Independence Day Film Festival jointly presented by the Indian Directorate of Film Festivals and Ministry of Defense, commemorating 70th Indian Independence Day. Produced by Sudhir Phadke who also composed music for this, it has been directed by Ved Rahi. Prabhakar Mone has been its chief production controller. The film reported a collection of 8.1 million at box-office against a budget of 4 million.

== Cast ==
- Shailendra Gaur as Vinayak Damodar Savarkar
- Surendra Rajan as Mohandas Karamchand Gandhi
- Navni Parihar as Mai Savarkar
- Sushmeena Parihar as Savarkar's son
- Mrinal Kulkarni
- Pankaj Berry as Madan Lal Dhingra
- Ram Awana
- Rohitash Gaud as Ganesh Damodar Savarkar
- Arun Shekhar
- Tom Alter
- Bob Christo
- Sunil Shende
- Arun Bakshi
- Supriya Karni
- Madhusudan Tamhane

== Production ==
This film was produced by Savarkar Darshan Prathisthan with help from Sudhir Phadke. A Times of India story dated 18 September 2001 quotes Prabhakar Mone; "more than 10000 people contributed from Rs. Five to Rs. Fifty lakh. Four years back, our present prime minister Atal Bihari Vajpayee himself helped in raising Rs. 3 million for the movie by giving a lecture in the US... Prominent singers like Asha Bhosle, Pt. Bhimsen Joshi and Anup Jalota also aided in fund-raising."

The muhurat shot of the film was taken in 1990, changes to the team resulted in a delayed completion, by 15 September 1998, a fresh muhurat shot taken under director Ram Gabale who was the eighth's person chosen for the job, and script-writer D. M. Mirasdar who was the tenth script writer engaged. The other directors involved were Rajdatta, Basu Bhattacharya, Hrishikesh Mukherjee, Dr. Chandraprakash Dwivedi, Ved Rahi, Pradeep Dikshit and Prabhakar Pendharkar. Script-writers earlier working on the project were G. R. Kamat, Ved Rahi, Dr. Chandraprakash Dwivedi, Vasant Deo and Shrinivas Joshi.

== Release ==
It premiered on 16 November 2001, in Mumbai, New Delhi, Nagpur and six other Indian cities. On 28 May 2012 its Gujarati language version was released by the chief minister of Gujarat, Narendra Modi. This version was released on DVD format.

== Reception ==
Anjum N reviewing the film for Rediff.com notes that though the film took a long time to produce this time lag is not evident. He also mentions the film publicity brochures that declare the film as "financed 'by the people'".

The film had a silver jubilee run at Plaza cinema, Mumbai and Pune's Prabhat cinema.

The Government of Goa, gave the film a "tax-free status"

== See also ==
- List of Asian historical drama films
- List of artistic depictions of Mahatma Gandhi
