= Shailendra Gaur =

Indian actor

Shailendra Gaur is an Indian actor known for portraying Indian politician and ideologue Vinayak Damodar Savarkar in the biopic film Veer Savarkar (2001) directed by Ved Rahi.

== Personal Life and Career ==
Shailendra Gaur lives in Mumbai. He received his Ph.D. Degree ( Doctorate Degree) in Hindi literature (Diaries). Shailendra started his acting career as a theatre actor in Delhi with theatre director Arvind Gaur and Panchchnan Pathak. Later he got trained from eminent theatre Guru Ebrahim Alkazi's "Living Theatre".. In Living Theatre, Shailendra acted in many stage plays directed by Ebrahim Alkazi.

Shailendra Gaur's filmography includes Vanvaas(2024)- Himachali Character. Gadar 2(2023)- Pakistani Pandit. Gandhi Godse ek Yudh( 2023)-Chief Secretary of PM Jawahar Lal Nehru. A Thursday(2022)- Secretary to PM. Six Nine Five(2024)- Former Prime Minister Shri Atal Bihari Vajpayee. Ek Rani aisi bhi(2013)- Chief Minister of Madhya Pradesh. Sargana- Gangster. Phata poster Nikla Hero(2013)- Farmer. Miss Anara(2007)- Inspector .

Some of the famous Indian TV Serials Shailendra Gaur has acted. Ballika Vadhu (2008)Colors TV, Kyu apne hue paraye (DD), Jassi jaisi koi nahi( Sony TV), Mohe rang de(2008)-Colors, Crime Patrol( Sony TV), Savdhaan India(2012)- Star Bharat, Koppa( DD), Dharti Ka Veer Yodha Prithviraj Chauhan(2006)- Star Plus, Sai Baba(2005)-Star Plus, Navya..Naye Dhadkan Naye Sawaal (2011)- Star Plus, Ranju Ki Betiyaan(2021)- Dangal TV. Code Red(2015)- Colors TV, Tere mere Sapne(2009)- Star Plus,
