= Mulk Raj Saraf =

Indian journalist and writer (1894–1989)

- Born: 8 April 1894; Samba, Jammu and Kashmir, India
- Died: 21 February 1989 (aged 94); Mumbai, Maharashtra, India
- Occupations: Journalist, writer
- Known for: Father of Journalism in Jammu & Kashmir
- Spouse: Gian Devi
- Children: 6
- Parent(s): Dayanand Saraf; Jamuna Devi
- Awards: Padma Shri

Lala Mulk Raj Saraf (8 April 1894 - 21 February 1989) was an Indian journalist and writer, with over seventy years of a distinguished career in journalism and social service. With several firsts to his name, he is most renowned for overcoming all odds to lay the foundation of journalism in Jammu and Kashmir, setting up the first printing press, and publishing the region's first newspaper, Ranbir. For his work in enabling a free press in Jammu and Kashmir, he is known as the "Father of Journalism in Jammu and Kashmir". A freedom fighter, social reformer, and much loved public figure, he was awarded the Padma Shri in 1976. Saraf established the JDGD Saraf Trust for promoting conscientious journalism in 1985.

He was born on 8 April 1894 in the Samba district of the Indian state of Jammu and Kashmir to Dayanand Saraf and Jamuna Devi and graduated from the Government Gandhi Memorial Science College Jammu. He started his career as a sub-editor at the nationalist daily Bande Mataram based in Punjab, worked there for a while, and returned to Jammu in 1924 to start J&K's first newspaper, Ranbir, and Rattan, one of the most successful children's magazines of the pre-independence era with subscribers from India and what is now Pakistan.

Saraf wrote articles and was the author of books including Meri Pakistan Yatra, Insaniyat Abhi Zinda Hai and Nagooh-e-Ranvir. Meri Pakistan Yatra, which describes his trip to Pakistan, was selected as Book of the Year by the Jammu and Kashmir Academy of Art, Culture and Languages in 1980. His autobiographical work was published in 1967 as Fifty years as a journalist. Saraf was the author of the first biography published in the Dogri language, Sher-e-Duggar Lala Hans Raj Mahajan Jeevan Katha (1968). He was awarded the fourth highest Indian civilian award of Padma Shri by the Government of India in 1976.

Mulk Raj Saraf died on 21 February 1989, at the age of 94, in Mumbai at the home of his son, Ved Rahi, a Bollywood personality and film director.
