= B. P. Sharma =

BP Sharma was a journalist of Jammu and Kashmir, India, who was listed in the Limca Book of Records for becoming the oldest working journalist at the age of 92. He died in 2005 at the age of 97.

== Biography ==
Sharma established the Jammu station of Radio Kashmir (All India Radio) and was its first director and also worked with Reuters, Times of India, Hindustan Times and The Tribune. He was also given the status of minister by the former Chief Minister of Jammu and Kashmir, Farooq Abdullah, after he helped to trace the lost documents pertaining to the Instrument of Accession of the state of Jammu and Kashmir with India, by the then Maharaja of the erstwhile princely state, Maharaja Hari Singh, in 1947.

Sharma became Principal Information Officer of Jammu and Kashmir. He was arrested in 1953 with the then Prime Minister, Sheikh Abdullah, by Bakshi Ghulam Mohammad who staged a coup.

After his release, Sharma refused to work under the Bakshi regime and joined the All India Radio at Calcutta. He was transferred to Bhopal, Indore and finally back to Jammu before he retired in 1966. He was immediately re-employed by the Jammu and Kashmir government to handle its publicity.

Sharma did much research into the language of Dogri. He unearthed several documents to prove that Dogri was an ancient language and also had its own grammar. He also wrote series of articles about political and historical developments in Jammu and Kashmir during the pre and post Independence era. He received awards from the First President of India, Dr. Rajendra Prasad, and the First Prime Minister, Pandit Jawahar Lal Nehru, at New Delhi.

Popularly known as the walking encyclopaedia of Jammu and Kashmir, he had the history of all important events at his fingertips.

As a member of the Sahitya Academy for many years, he contributed much towards the development of the Dogri language. His research in the field of Dogri after his retirement from AIR helped to get Dogri included in the Eighth Schedule. The Dogras of Jammu had been struggling for long for due recognition of the language.

Sharma also contributed towards publication of the book "The Stamps of Jammu and Kashmir", which was authored by Frits Staal, a professor at University of California, Berkeley, and published by the New York Collectors Club in 1983. The book carries a series of articles about the postal system under the Dogra rulers.

Frits Stall wrote in the preface that Sharma had inspired and helped him in bringing out the book regarding the postal system introduced about 150 years ago by Maharaja Ranbir Singh.

In the 1980s, the selection list of students for the medical colleges of Jammu and Kashmir was challenged each year in the High Court causing embarrassment to the government. Mr.Sharma was then appointed Chairman of the selection committee by the Jammu and Kashmir government to streamline the process. During his tenure as Chairman not a single complaint of regional discrimination, nepotism or favouritism in selection of candidates was made. Members of the opposition in the Legislative assembly and Legislative Council also appreciated his efforts to cleanse the process of selection of candidates for admission to the medical colleges.

"B.P.Sharma, an active journalist for more than 71 years, wrote his first newsletter in Ranbir, Jammu's first newspaper launched in 1924, at the age of 17 in January 1927. In 1934 he launched J&K's first English weekly in Srinagar "The Kashmir Times" for which he wrote beyond the age of 88, besides having worked as a correspondent of many prestigious news agencies like Reuters and Associated Press of India."

== "The stamps of Jammu and Kashmir" ==
In the preface to "The Stamps of Jammu and Kashmir", Frits Staal wrote:

"The third scholar who has inspired and helped me is B.P.Sharma, President of The Dogri Research Institute of Jammu, and former Director of Information of the state of Jammu and Kashmir. When I visited Jammu for the first time, Shri Sharma walked me around tirelessly and provided a wealth of information far surpassing anything I had expected or even imagined. I could not have found a more authentic and authoritative source of knowledge on the Dogra renaissance of the later half of the 19th century in Jammu and Kashmir."

The book carries a separate chapter "Five fruitful days in Srinagar", By B.P.Sharma and Frits Stall.
