= Patit Pavan Mandir =

Hindu temple in Ratnagiri, India

Patit Pavan Mandir is a Hindu temple in Ratnagiri, India, built by Bhagoji Baloji Keer between 1929 and 1931 at the request of Vinayak Damodar Savarkar.

== Construction ==
The temple was built by the Ratnagiri philanthropist Bhagoji Baloji Keer (also known as Bhagojisheth Keer) at his own expense, at the request of Vinayak Damodar Savarkar on behalf of the Ratnagiri Hindu Sabha. An inscription placed on the entrance archway at the time of inauguration reads:

रत्नागिरी हिंदु सभेचे वतीनें — देशवीर विनायकराव सावरकर यांचे विनंती वरून भक्ति भूषण श्रीयुत भागुजी बाळुजी कीर ह्यांनीं हें श्री पतित पावनाचें मंदीर अखिल हिंदु प्रित्यर्थ स्वकीय व्ययानें श्री भागेश्वराच्या कृपेनें बांधून लोक सेवेस अर्पण केलें आहे. मिति फाल्गुन शुद्ध ७ रोज मंगळवार शके १८५२. ता. २४ फेब्रुवारी १९३१.

[On behalf of the Ratnagiri Hindu Sabha — Upon the request of the Deshveer Vinayakrao Savarkar, Bhakti Bhushan Shri Bhaguji Baluji Keer has built this temple of Shri Patit Pavan at his own expense for all Hindus, by the grace of Shri Bhageshwar, and dedicated it to public service. Date: Phalguna Shuddha 7, Tuesday, Shaka 1852. 24 February 1931.]

Raosaheb Kasabe, a historian, summarised the collaborative character of the project: the concept of the temple was Savarkar's, but the funds were provided by Bhagojisheth Keer. Keer's expenditure on the temple and an adjacent tenement block is documented in the 1933 audit report of the Bhagoji Baloji Keer Charitable Trust. He subsequently contributed ₹1,500 annually for the upkeep and illumination of the temple. In recognition of his contribution, the Hindu Mahasabha erected a bust of Keer in the temple courtyard during his lifetime.

In 2025, a controversy arose over the Maharashtra State Textbook Bureau's (Balbharati) Class 8 history textbook, which stated that Savarkar had built the Patitpavan Temple without mentioning Keer. The Ratnagiri Taluka Bhandari Samaj Sangh formally objected to this formulation, citing the gateway inscription and the 1933 trust audit report, and demanded a correction. Sadanand More, who had chaired the history subject committee at the time of the textbook's 2018 publication, acknowledged to BBC Marathi that a reference to Bhagoji Keer should have appeared in the text. The convener of Balbharati stated that a correction would appear in the 2025–26 academic-year edition.
