= Chandranath Basu =

Bengali conservative essayist

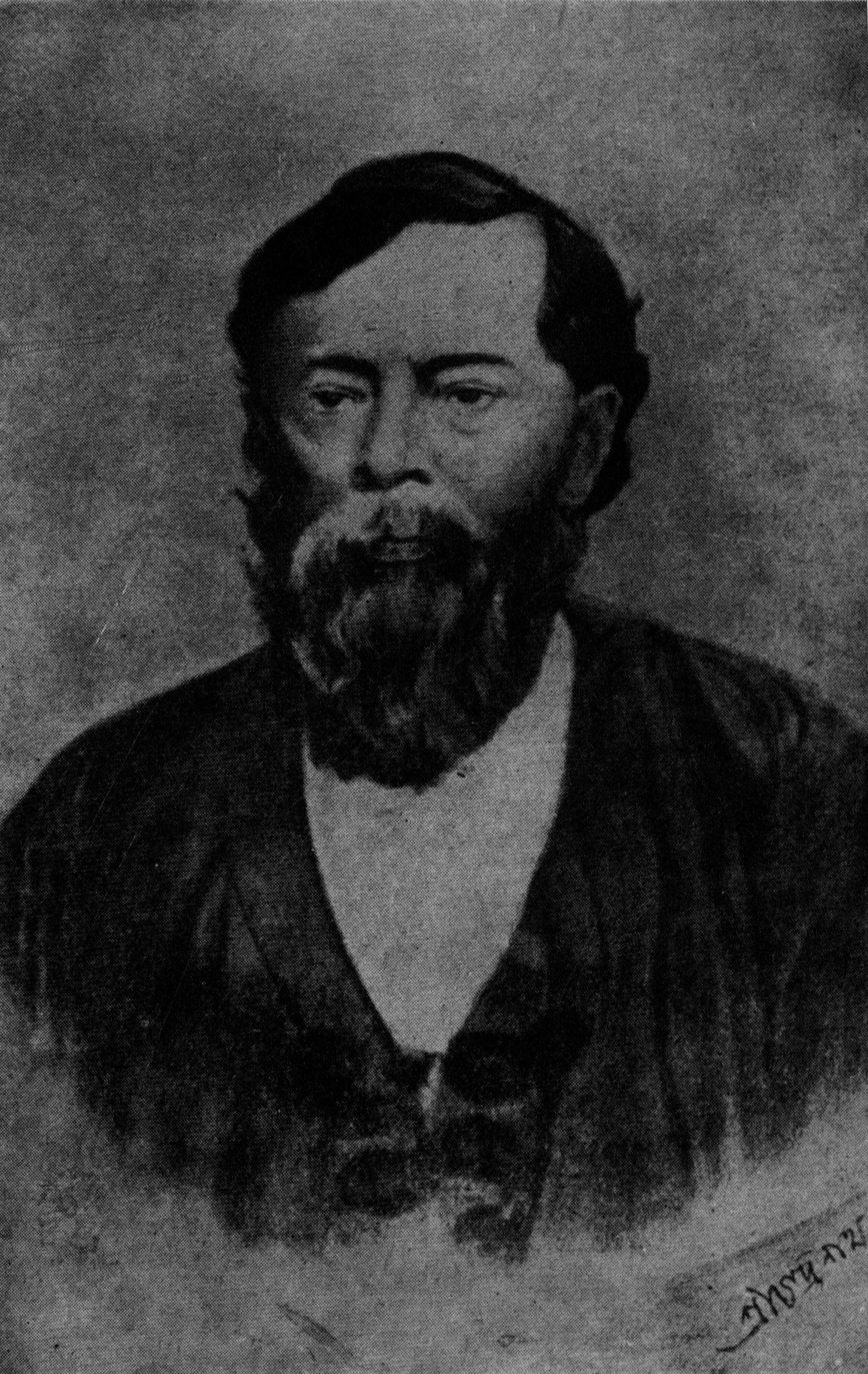
- Born: 31 August 1844; Kaikala, Hooghly district, Bengal Presidency, British India (present-day West Bengal, India)
- Died: 20 June 1910 (aged 65)
- Education: Presidency College
- Father: Sitanath Basu
- Relatives: Kashinath Basu (grandfather)

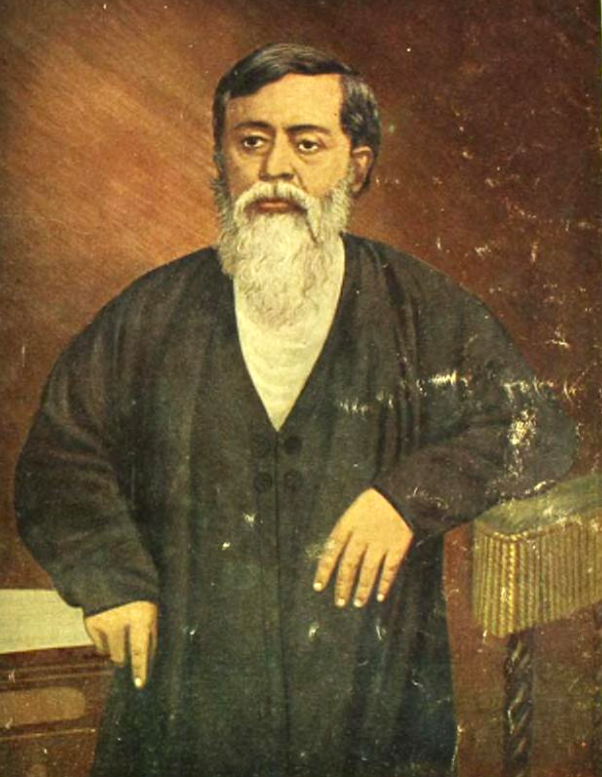
Chandranath Basu in Bharatbarsa Patrika 1936

Chandranath Basu (1844–1910) was an Indian conservative essayist. Basu coined the term Hindutva (Note: Amiya Sen notes that Basu's usage of the word was to merely portray a traditional Hindu cultural view in contrast to the political ideology, purveyed by Vinayak Damodar Savarkar. Other scholars have shared similar observations.) and has been regarded as a doyen of economic and Indian nationalism in Bengal.

== Early life and education ==
Chandranath Basu was born on 31 August 1844 in a Kayastha family at Kaikala (village) in Hooghly district, Bengal Presidency, British India. He was the second son of Sitanath Basu, and had 3 sisters.

Basu studied at the Hedore School, a missionary institute for a while, before dropping out due to a fear of being baptized. He then joined the Oriental Seminary because it had a teacher who took care of English pronunciation among the students.

He pursued his B.A. (1862–1865) from Presidency College on a financial scholarship provided by the Department of Public Instruction and went on to secure fifth place in the First Arts examination, before eventually topping the list of graduates in 1865. He received a M.A. in history in 1866 and a degree in law, the following year.

== Career ==
After serving in various officio-legal capacities, including a six-month stint as the Deputy magistrate of Dacca, Basu permanently settled in Kolkata after being inducted as a Librarian of the Bengal Library. In 1877, he was also appointed as the official Translator to the Bengal government; Basu served in this capacity till his superannuation in 1904.

He also served as the principal of Joypur College Of Education and held a seat in the Vernacular Textbook Committee (responsible for selecting curricula up-till secondary tier). Basu was also the temporary vice-chairman of the Bangiya Sahitya Parishad for a few months.

== Activism and reception ==
=== Earlier works ===
His earliest works were in English and concerned with the Glorious Revolution. One of his essays, published in 1864 was positively reviewed by The Englishman, which doubted whether it was written by a ‘native pen’.

Basu's literary talent was first spotted by Bankim Chandra Chatterjee in his review of Krishnakanter Will and it was at Chatterjee's behest, that Basu took to writing in Bengali and got associated with Bangadarshan, a pioneering magazine of the late 1800s.

Basu used to frequent Brahmo discussions during his days at Presidency and was even attracted to them for a short while despite his dislike of the Scottish Enlightenment, whose luminaries were borrowed from extensively. His faith in Hinduism was restored by an orthodox Brahmin pandit Sasadhar Tarkachuramani, whom he met at Bankim's residence.

=== Pasupati Samvad ===
After the publication of Pasupati Samvad, Basu began to command a huge popularity among the masses and came to be recognized as a prominent voice of the orthodox sections of the Hindu society. He went on to reignite theological debates between Christian and Brahmo intellectuals and advocated for a rigid abidance by religious scriptures.

=== Shakuntala Tattwa ===
One of his first major work was Shakuntala Tattwa, a comparative study on Kalidasa's Shakuntala which sought to locate conservative Hindu values in the literature and met with immense success in the conservative circles of Bengal.

Comparing Shakuntala with Juliet, Basu highlighted the victory of self-restrain and penance (Dharma) over the unbridled materialistic outpouring of love (Adharma) in mitigating difficult personal situations. Subsequently, European gender relations including pre-marital romance etc. are sharply critiqued and lambasted whilst restriction on the public dissemination of feminine charm and sexuality is advocated, lest the males succumb to it.

Amiya Prosad Sen notes Basu to propound three major themes through his work—rejecting a man-centric notion of universe, critiquing the usage of non-societal parameters to measure self, and denying temporality of tradition; in entirety, Sen deemed it to be a "thoughtless and tendentious application" of hardcore Hindu orthodox thought-school, which managed to locate conservative values where there were none.

=== Hindutva: Hindur Prakrita Itihas ===
In 1892, Basu published a book entitled Hindutva: Hindur Prakrita Itihas, considered to be his magnum opus, wherein he propounded the Advaita Vedanta school of thought and coined the term Hindutva, which assumed a variety of traditional and often contradictory beliefs and practices under a common fold.

Notably, he did not pursue an intensely mythological line yet choose to portray the Hindus as the only beings who have gained the spiritual consciousness to understand that humanity is in itself, a form of divinity and manifest its dharmic scopes, having been the sole harbingers of absolute harmony, magnanimity, honesty and unity. He rejected the positivist thought school and saw God through the prism of his creations, whereupon any challenge to traditional societies were equivalent of a challenge to the legitimacy and omniscience of the God, Himself.

In the book, Basu defended the caste system and child marriage, while advocating for patriarchal values. Parallel to fellow Hindu conservatives and deriving from his own theses, Basu went on to portray the Hindus as fundamentally superior to people of all other faiths, whose traditional social customs and practices in that they have survived centuries of thought-schools and hence were axiomatically superior to western culture and way of life. He was also rigidly against religious conversions and insisted that India shall not be a homeland, for foreign religions like Islam and Christianity.

=== Manuals and pamphlets ===
Basu wrote two short but little known manuals on the ideal Hindu way of domestic life: Garhyastha Path (1886) and the Garhyastha Vidhi (1887). They were primarily aimed at women.

One of his pamphlets located the superiority of the Hindu woman in her dedication to cooking in the kitchen for long hours, despite being engulfed in the smokes and flames. In 1904, he published a detailed manual for the conduct of men - Sangyam Sikhhar Nimnotomo Sopan.

=== Masculinity ===
In 1901, he wrote Sabitri Tattva a comparative study on Savitri and Satyavan; Basu proceeded with a similar outlook as in Shakuntala Tattwa and portraying Savitri as the ideal Hindu wife, held marriage as an institute that permeated death and any temporality.

Sen notes him to be the foremost spokesman of the orthodox view on Hindu marriage; Basu essentially viewed the institution as a longstanding social ritual for the sole purpose of maintaining progeny and male hegemony, absent any locus of individual autonomy.

Besides this, he supported child marriages in that it led to the development of an ideal house wife, advocated for the continuity of patriarchal traits, prized female chastity as a social gift and opposed reforms in female education, widow remarriage and gender rights. He dissented against the Age of Consent Act in 1891, which sought to raise the age of consent for sexual intercourse from ten to twelve years in all jurisdictions and treat any violation thereof as rape, as violations of sacrosanct Hindu customs.

Tanika Sarkar notes that the adherence to Hindu customs was so rigid, that Basu and others went to the extent of showcasing the downsides of the status-quo as the strength of the Hindu women to bear such adversities.

=== Miscellaneous ===
Basu was a vocal supporter of the Indigenous Aryan hypothesis, having extensively argued for the superiority of Aryan race and that the Indian Hindus were true Aryans; Tapan Raychaudhuri commented of the thought-school as 'aggressive chauvinism'.

Basu also engaged in aggressive exchanges with contemporary intellectuals; Tanika Sarkar notes a polemical discourse with Rabindranath Tagore concerning Hindu marriage and Hindu diet. He also conflicted with Nabinchandra Sen whilst voting against the inclusion of one of his plays, Palashir Yuddha in school-syllabus; in a letter to Sen, Basu inquires about why a Hindu ought to feel saddened at the defeat of a Muslim ruler. An angered Sen penned a dismissive reply and in personal records, alluded Basu of being a dovetail of Bankim Chandra who merely reproduced the latter's private opinions as his own, in a verbose manner. At last, Sen submitted a revised version which went on to be included whilst Basu wrote an apology letter, prodded by a mutual friend Gooroodas Banerjee.

== Death and legacy ==
Basu died on 20 June 1910. He heavily influenced Bhudev Mukhopadhyay, an important figure of the Bengal Renaissance.
