= Ved Rahi =

Indian author (1933–2026)

Ved Rahi (22 May 1933 – 1 November 2026) was an Indian author predominantly writing in Dogri language. He directed well received mythological serial Meerabai for Doordarshan in 1996 under UTV productions. Rahi was also credited with screenplay and dialogues of various Hindi Bollywood films and TV serials. He directed the Hindi film Veer Savarkar (2001), a bio-epic on the life of Indian revolutionary Vinayak Damodar Savarkar.

== Background ==
Rahi was born in Jammu on 22 May 1933. His father, Mulk Raj Saraf started the first newspaper in the princely state of Jammu and Kashmir titled Ranbir in 1924.

Rahi died on 1 November 2026, at the age of 93.

== Works ==
Rahi published various short stories in Dogri language and along with Narendra Khajuria, Madan Mohan Sharma and Prof. Nilamber Dev Sharma, is considered as a noted Dogri writer of modern times.

His books have been translated to various other Indian languages. Translation of Lal Ded in Sindhi language (by Sarita Sharma as Lal Ded (2015) and by Rattan Lal Shant as Lal Ded (2015)) and of Aale in Kashmiri language (by Abdul Gani Beg Athar as Lakhakar Yin Vaapas (2010)) have also received Sahitya Akademi Translation Prize in Sindhi and Kashmiri categories respectively.

Film

- 1966 – Yeh Raat Phir Na Aayegi as screenplay writer
- 1970 – Pavitra Paapi as dialogues and screenplay writer
- 1971 – Aap Aye Bahaar Ayee as writer
- 1971 – Pavitra Paapi as screenplay writer
- 1972 – Be-Imaan as dialogues writer
- 1972 – Mome Ki Gudiya as dialogues writer
- 1973 – Prem Parbat as director
- 1975 – Sanyasi as dialogues writer
- 1976 – Charas as dialogues writer
- 1980 – Kali Ghata as director, producer and writer
- 1982 – Bezubaan as dialogues writer
- 2001 – Veer Savarkar as director, writer

Books

- Kaale Hatthe – Novel
- Garbh Joon – Novel
- Lal Ded – Novel
- Aale – Novel
- Ik Journalist di Aatamkatha – Biography of Mulk Raj Saraf
- Haad Bedi Te Pattan – Novel
- Andhi Surang – Novel
- Ek Tha Chitrakaar, Ek Tha Raja – Short stories
- Maut – Short stories
- Soch

Television

- Gul Gulshan Gulfaam Doordarshan
- Zindagi: (1987)
- Meerabai: Doordarshan

== Awards ==
- 1983 – Sahitya Akademi Award winners for Dogri for this short stories collection Aale.
- 2011 – Mahapandit Rahul Sankrityayan Award (Award presented in 2014)
- 2019 – Kusumagraj Rashtriya Sahitya Puraskar
