= The Indian War of Independence (book) =

1909 history book by Vinayak Damodar Savarkar

- Title page for The Indian War of Independence (1909)
- Author: Vinayak Damodar Savarkar
- Language: Marathi, English
- Genre: History (Nationalist)
- Publisher: Sethani Kampani, Bombay (reprint, India)
- Publication date: 1909, 1947 (First public edition, India)
- Publication place: India
- English publication date: 1909

The Indian War of Independence is an Indian nationalist history of the 1857 revolt by Vinayak Damodar Savarkar that was first published in 1909.

== Creation ==
Savarkar initially wrote The Indian War of Independence in Marathi, in response to celebrations in Great Britain of the 50th anniversary of the Indian Rebellion of 1857 with records from India Office archives. The project received support from Indian nationalists in Britain, including the likes of Madame Cama, V.V.S. Iyer and M.P.T. Acharya, as well as Indian students who had dared not show their support or sympathy for India House openly. The book sought to bring the Indian movement to public attention in Britain as well as to inspire nationalist movements in India.

Savarkar finished writing the book in 1907, when he was at the India House in London, but could not find a publisher in Europe because the book was written in Marathi. So, he decided to publish an English translation. It is not clear who translated the book, but the language is quite consistent throughout the translation, which suggests that the translation was done by a single person. The anonymous publisher simply states that "other residents at the India house" translated the work, and that they expedited the publication without waiting for an elegant translation.

== Inspiration ==
The book was influenced by histories of the French Revolution, the American Revolution and Indian histories of the Maratha conquests.

Savarkar was inspired by the Italian revolutionary Giuseppe Mazzini's assertion that the history of a revolution must consider "the principles and motives of the people involved", and referred to the First Italian War of Independence as an example for the Indian historians to consider.

Karl Marx had published a short article named "The Indian Revolt" in the New-York Tribune in 1857. Some later writers have wrongly claimed that Karl Marx inspired Savarkar's use of the term "war of independence" for the event. Marx never used the term to describe the 1857 revolt, although a volume of his articles was published in Moscow in 1959 under the title The First Indian War of Independence 1857–1859. This volume was based on a Russian-language edition, whose title does not use the term "First". The title may have been inspired by Savarkar's book, whose original edition did not use the term "First" either. The word "first" appears in an edition of Savarkar's book published in 1945 in Kuala Lumpur. The edition, titled The Volcano, or The First War of Indian Independence, was published by the Indian National Army (INA) and the Japanese Ministry of Propaganda. The book is said to have inspired the formation of the Rani of Jhansi Regiment.

== Ban ==
The book was seen at the time as highly inflammatory, and the Marathi edition was banned in British India even before its publication. Publication of the English translation faltered after British printers and publishing houses were warned by the Home Office of its highly seditious content, while the Foreign Office brought pressure on the French government to prevent its publication in Paris. In July 1909, Madan Lal Dhingra, a member of Savarkar's Abhinav Bharat Society, assassinated the British official Curzon Wyllie. British authorities knew that Savarkar had planned to release a text, and were concerned that it may incite further acts of violence similar to that committed by Dhingra.

Savarkar's earlier works were not widely read: his first book - on Mazzini - was immediately banned by the government; the manuscript of his second book - on the history of the Sikhs - was either lost in post or destroyed by officials before it could be published. Therefore, Savarkar's associates maintained secrecy regarding the book's publication and circulation. An underground network of revolutionaries circulated the book, hoping that it would encourage further unrest in British India.

On 21 July 1909, H .A. Stuart, the Director of the CID in Bombay, sent a telegram to Indian government officials urging them to intercept the text that was expected to arrive in Indian ports from England. He knew that the subject of the text was 1857 uprising, but did not know the title of the work or the number of copies being shipped. He suspected that there were two editions of the text - the original Marathi text published in Germany, and an English translation published in London. The Viceroy of India, Lord Minto, supported the confiscation even though officials complained that they could not confiscate the book under the Sea Customs Act or the Indian Post Office Act, without more details about the text. By this time, the first edition of Savarkar's work had already been published as a 451-page book titled The Indian War of Independence of 1857, with the author listed as "An Indian Nationalist".

The book was ultimately printed in the Netherlands in 1909, with the British government not tracing it was until too late. The copies were printed with false dust wrappers purporting to be copies of The Pickwick Papers and other literary works, and large quantities were shipped to India, where it quickly became a bible of political extremists. It was excluded from the British Library's catalogue to prevent Indian students from accessing it. In India, the book remained banned until the end of British rule in 1947.

== Savarkar's views ==
So, now, the original antagonism between Hindus and Mahomedans might be consigned to the Past. Their present relation was one not of rulers and ruled, foreigner and native, but simply that of brothers with the one difference between them of religion alone. For, they were both children of the soil of Hindusthan. Their names were different, but they were all children of the same Mother; India therefore being the common mother of these two, they were brothers by blood.

— V.D. Savarkar, The Indian War of Independence

The book describes the Indian Rebellion of 1857 as a unified and national uprising of India as a nation against British authority.

Savarkar states that both the British and the Indians committed cruel and brutal acts during the uprising, but characterizes such acts by Indians as justifiable acts of vengeance. On the other hand, he describes such acts by the British as oppressive and disproportionate, giving the example of massacres by General James George Smith Neill. According to Savarkar, the number of Indians killed by Neill in Allahabad alone was more than all the English people killed, but the colonial historians described him as a "bold and brave" man, whose "timely cruelty" showed his "great love of humanity". Stating that Krishna advised Arjuna to abandon the code of ethics against an enemy who was unethical, Savarkar argues that the cruel acts committed by Indians in revenge were justifiable.

Unlike Savarkar's later works, the book emphasizes Hindu-Muslim unity, stating that they worked together for "freeing their country". In the introduction to the book, Savarkar states that the feeling of hatred against the Muslims was necessary during Shivaji's period, but it would be "unjust and foolish" to nurse such hatred now.

== Critical reception and legacy ==
Regarding the national character of the revolt, some erstwhile and modern histories draw similar conclusions as Savarkar, while others, including R.C. Majumdar, disagree with Savarkar's conclusions in his book on the national and unified character of the mutiny.

The book is considered to be an influential work in Indian history and nationalist writing, and also one of Savarkar's most influential works in developing and framing ideas of Hinduism.
