= Belatgavhan =

Village in Maharashtra

- village
- Location within Maharashtra Location within India
- Coordinates: 19.923327°N 73.845634°E
- Country: India
- State: Maharashtra
- District: Nashik

Belatgavhan is a small village about 3 km from the town of Deolali Camp in Nashik district of Maharashtra. It is located on the banks of Darna river. The main occupation of people here is farming. The local dialect is Marathi.
