= Ganesh Damodar Savarkar =

Hindutva activist (1879–1945)

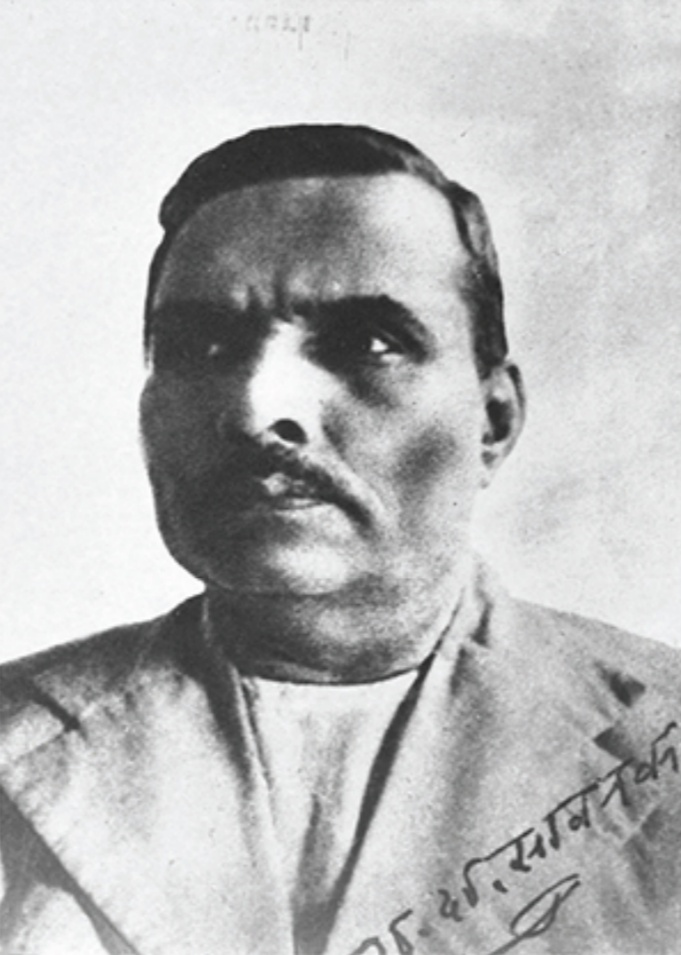
- Born: 13 June 1879; Bhagur, Bombay Presidency, British India (present-day Maharashtra, India)
- Died: 16 March 1945 (aged 65); Sangli, Bombay Presidency, British India (present-day India)
- Other name: Babarao Savarkar
- Known for: Indian independence revolutionary, Political Prisoner (1909-1922; 1933-1937), Hindutva Activist
- Spouse: Yasubai Savarkar
- Relatives: Vinayak Damodar Savarkar (brother)

Ganesh Damodar Savarkar (13 June 1879 – 16 March 1945), also known as Babarao Savarkar, was an Indian Hindutva activist. He was the founder of the Abhinav Bharat Society along with Vinayak Damodar Savarkar, his younger brother. He was a political prisoner twice; first from 1909-1922 (of which 1910-1921 was spent in the Cellular Jail); and second from 1933-1937. Both times he was unconditionally released.

He was one of the first five founding members of the Rashtriya Swayamsevak Sangh, a Hindutva paramilitary organisation. He was also a member of the Hindu Mahasabha, a Hindu Nationalist political party.

== Early life ==
Ganesh was the eldest sibling of the Savarkar brothers Vinayak, and Narayan, they also had a sister Mainabai, who was the penultimate child of their parents. Ganesh took responsibility of developing and influencing his brothers’ since their childhood. His parents' death laid the liability of his family at an age of twenty years.

== Independence activism and first Political Imprisonment (1909-1922) ==
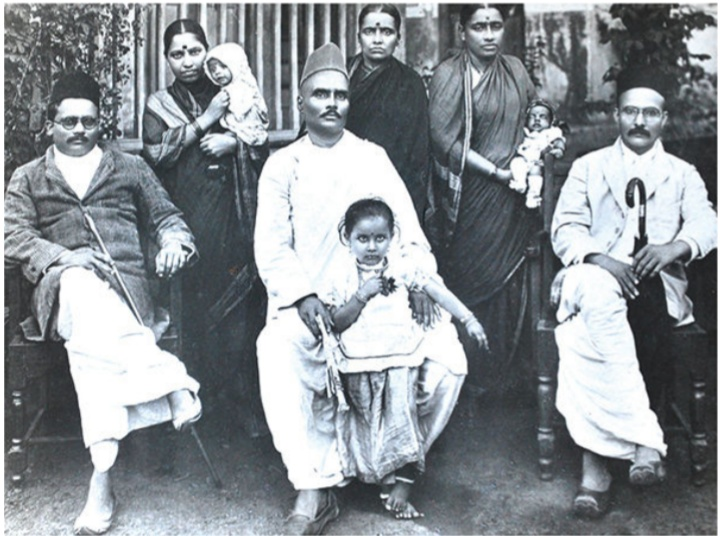
The Savarkar brothers (left to right) Narayan, Ganesh and Vinayak, with Shanta, sister Maina Kale and Yamuna

He led an armed movement against the British colonial government in India, he was sentenced to transportation for life to the Andaman Islands as a result in 1909.The then collector of Nasik, A. M. T. Jackson was assassinated by Anant Laxman Kanhere in retaliation. He arrived in the Andamans in 1910. His brother arrived in July of the next year.

In December 1919, King George V promulgated the Royal Amnesty. Thousands of prisoners were released in the mainland; and in 1920 majority of Andaman political prisoners were sent back to the mainland; most released shortly after arrival. However, there were 30 "dangerous" Andaman political prisoners which were excluded; including the Savarkar Brothers.

The Viceroy accepted the recommendations of the Indian Jails Committee (1919-20) after a massive pressure campaign for the release of the Savarkar Brothers. In May 1921; they were returned to the mainland, however they were kept imprisoned. Ganesh's health was failing, in fact his condition was worse on the mainland than it was in the Andamans. It was certain Ganesh was going to expire in September 1922. To avoid the embarrassment of a death in custody; he was unconditionally released in a corpse like state on a stretcher.

== Second Political Imprisonment (1933-1937) ==
In 1933, there occurred a bomb explosion in the Empire Theatre of Bombay. The police in a raid found a pamphlet which had the art of bomb making. When the police interrogated youngsters; they caved under pressure and informed the police that Savarkar had left a trunk at the youngsters’ house which belonged to him, and left it there. Inside contained the pamphlet .

Savarkar’s residence in the Kher Area of Bombay was raided. He was arrested and brought before court. Savarkar said “I hardly know this young man. He used to come to me two or three years ago to record some songs that could be sung on festive occasions. Other than that, I have no relation with him. So why should I keep my trunk with someone with whom I have a passing acquaintance.” The youngster also corroborated Ganesh's narrative. The court acquitted Ganesh for lack of firm evidence.

As he walked out of the court in April 1933, he was immediately re-arrested & imprisoned without trial under the Special Powers Ordinance X of 1932. He was kept in Byculla Jail, Bombay for 3 weeks; then Nashik Jail Bombay for the remaining 5 weeks.

Immediately after that, he was served with restrictions:

1) Internment in Nashik Municipality, meaning he was banned from leaving the municipal limits.

2) Ban from political activity (indirectly or directly).

3) Ban from partaking in any public meeting.

These restrictions were only supposed to apply for a month, but was periodically extended.

In 1937, provincial elections (with an expanded but still limited franchise) were held across the 11 Governors’ Provinces under the Government of India Act 1935. In Bombay, the Indian National Congress won, but refused to form a government because of fear of misuse of the Governors’ Special Powers under the Act In the meantime, the Governor appointed an interim government led by Dhanjsah Cooper on 1st April 1937. Cooper needed the seats to form a majority government, and Jamnadas M. Mehta, a representative of the Tilakite Democratic Swaraj Party, expressed his willingness, in exchange for the release of the Savarkar Brothers. In May 1937, the Governor agreed to Mehta’s request.

M. J. Akbar writes that "The five friends who started the RSS were B. S. Moonje, L. V. Paranjape, Dr. Tholkar, Babarao Savarkar and Hedgewar himself."
