= Bhagur =

- Municipal council
- Location in Maharashtra, India Bhagur (India)
- Coordinates: 19.8789°N 73.8334°E
- Country: India
- State: Maharashtra
- District: Nashik

Area
  - Total: 0.67 km^{2} (0.26 sq mi)

Population (2001)
  - Total: 12,454
  - Density: 19,000/km^{2} (48,000/sq mi)

Languages
  - Marathi Official: Marathi
- Time zone: UTC+5:30 (IST)

Bhagur is a municipal council in Nashik District in the state of Maharashtra, India. Bhagur is the birthplace of Indian independence movement revolutionary Vinayak Damodar Savarkar. It is located 4 km from Deolali and 22 km from Nashik city.

== Demographics ==
Bhagur (M Cl) town is situated in district NASHIK, Maharashtra. The Bhagur town has population of 12353, male population is 6201 and female population is 6152 as per the Census 2011 data. Population of Children under the age of 0-6 is 1339, male child population under the age of six is 728 and female child population under the age of six is 611. Total literacy rate of Bhagur city is 92.12%, male literacy rate is 96.99% and female literacy rate is 87.31%. In Bhagur Female Sex Ratio is 992 per 1000 male persons. Child sex ratio is 839 per 1000 male child under the age of six. Total number of house hold in Bhagur is 2545.

== Administration ==
The city is administered by the Bhagur Municipal Council, which was established in 1925.

== About Bhagur ==
According to Census 2011 information the location code or village code of Bhagur Rural village is 551014. Bhagur Rural village is located in Nashik tehsil of Nashik district in Maharashtra, India. It is situated 20km away from sub-district headquarter Nashik (tehsildar office) and 20km away from district headquarter Nashik. As per 2009 stats, Lahvit is the gram panchayat of Bhagur Rural village.

The total geographical area of village is 2582 hectares. Bhagur Rural has a total population of 276 peoples, out of which male population is 143 while female population is 133. There are about 49 houses in Bhagur rural village.

When it comes to administration, Bhagur Rural village is administrated by a sarpanch who is elected representative of the village by the local elections. As per 2019 stats, Bhagur Rural village comes under Devlali assembly constituency & Nashik parliamentary constituency. Bhagur is nearest town to bhagur rural for all major economic activities, which is approximately 2km away.
