= Ranbir (newspaper) =

Urdu language newspaper

- Editor-in-chief: Lala Mulkraj Saraf
- Founded: 24 June 1924
- Ceased publication: 18 May 1950
- Language: Urdu language
- Headquarters: Jammu

Ranbir (Urdu: رنبیر) was a daily Urdu language newspaper published from Jammu, India. It was the first daily newspaper in Jammu and Kashmir.

== Founding ==
Ranbir was founded and edited by Lala Mulk Raj Saraf. He had previously worked as sub-editor of Lala Lajpat Rai's nationalist organ Bande Mataram. Saraf had negotiated for some time to obtain the permission from the Maharaja Pratap Singh of Jammu and Kashmir to publish Ranbir as a statewide weekly.

The name Ranbir, meaning "knight of the battlefield", was chosen as Saraf had founded the newspaper after battling several odds, and he envisaged that Ranbir would be waging a relentless struggle against those who stood in the way of healthy development of society. The name also coincides with the name of Maharaja Ranbir Singh, son of Maharaja Gulab Singh, the founder of state of Jammu and Kashmir. The first issue of Ranbir was published on 24 June 1924. The printing press to publish Ranbir was also set up by Mulk Raj Saraf and it was named as "Public Printing Press". Instantly after its foundation, the paper gained a wide readership in the state.

== 1930 ban ==
In May 1930 Maharaja Hari Singh issued a ban on Ranbir (accusing it of 'subversive propaganda'), following an article about an agitation in Jammu related to the arrest of Mahatma Gandhi in British India. The Maharaja argued that Ranbir had, in its 7 May 1930 (Baisakh 25, 1987) issue exaggerated the participation figures in the Jammu protest and that the newspaper had false alluded that the Maharaja himself would have supported the protests. The newspaper was allowed to resume publication in November 1931. This period was marked by increased pressure towards responsible government in Jammu and Kashmir, a movement that Ranbir supported.

== 1947 ban and later years ==
The newspaper was banned in June 1947, following having demanded accession to India and urged for the release of Sheikh Abdullah. The ban was eventually lifted and Ranbir re-appeared in September 1947. In the following years Ranbir was an important and balanced nationalist voice in Jammu and Kashmir. Ranbir continued its run through several years of upheaval was finally closed down on 18 May 1950.
