= Vinayak Damodar Savarkar =

Indian politician and ideologue (1883–1966)

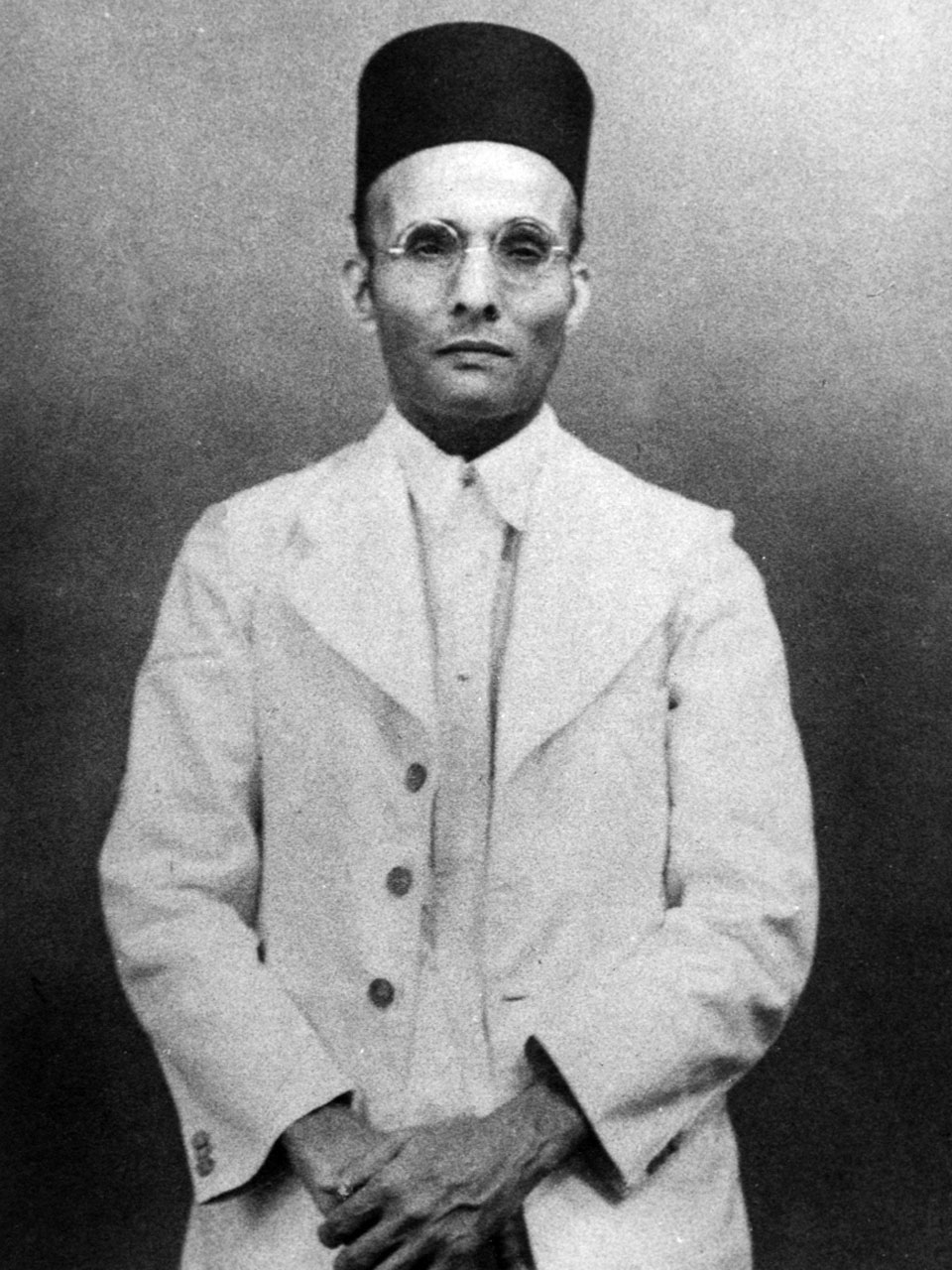
- Savarkar, c. 1910
- Born: 28 May 1883; Bhagur, Bombay Presidency, British India
- Died: 26 February 1966 (aged 82); Bombay, Maharashtra, India
- Occupations: Politician; ideologue
- Known for: Hindutva
- Notable work: Essentials of Hindutva
- Political party: Hindu Mahasabha
- Spouse: Yamunabai (m. 1901; died 1963)
- Relatives: Ganesh Damodar Savarkar (brother)

Vinayak Damodar Savarkar (Note: IPA: [ʋinaːjək d̪aːmoːd̪əɾ saːʋəɾkəɾ]) (Marathi: विनायक दामोदर सावरकर; 28 May 1883 – 26 February 1966) was an Indian politician and ideologue. He developed the Hindu nationalist political ideology of Hindutva in his 1923 pamphlet entitled Essentials of Hindutva, published while he was incarcerated at Ratnagiri.

Savarkar began his political activities as a high school student and continued at Fergusson College in Pune. He and his brother founded a secret society called Abhinav Bharat Society. When Savarkar travelled to England for his law studies, he involved himself with organisations such as India House and the Free India Society. He also published books advocating complete Indian independence by revolutionary means.

In 1910, Savarkar was arrested by British authorities and deported back to India as a result of his involvement with India House. Upon returning to India, Savarkar was sentenced to 50 years of imprisonment in the Cellular Jail in the Andaman and Nicobar Islands. He was released in 1924 after writing a series of mercy petitions to the British colonial government. According to historian A. Devare, Savarkar “virtually ceased” his criticism of British rule in India after his release from the Cellular Jail in 1924. He remained restricted to Ratnagiri district and prohibited from political activity until 1937. Savarkar started travelling widely, becoming a prominent orator and writer who advocated for Hindu political and social unity. In his 1937 Ahmedabad presidential address, Savarkar described Hindus and Muslims as “two nations in the main” in India, a position that has been interpreted by scholars as an expression of the two-nation theory. The Hindu Mahasabha under Savarkar's leadership endorsed the idea of India as a Hindu Rashtra (Hindu nation).

In 1939, the ruling Indian National Congress (INC) resigned en masse after Britain declared India a belligerent in World War II. The Hindu Mahasabha under Savarkar formed alliances with the All-India Muslim League and other non-INC parties to form government in many states. Subsequently, the INC, under Gandhi's leadership, launched the Quit India Movement; Savarkar boycotted the movement, writing a letter titled "Stick to your Posts" and recruiting Indians for the British war effort. In 1948, Savarkar was tried for his alleged involvement in the conspiracy to assassinate Mahatma Gandhi but was acquitted for lack of sufficient evidence. The Justice Jeevan Lal Kapur Commission into Gandhi's murder later concluded that Savarkar was involved in the crime. Savarkar died before the commission's final report, having intentionally starved himself to death in a ceremonial fast. In 2017, the Supreme Court of India set up an amicus curiae under Additional Solicitor General Amarendra Sharan to investigate into the case. The report submitted by the amicus curiae states "since the late Vinayak D. Savarkar had been acquitted, at this stage, it would neither be advisable/ desirable nor possible to come to a definitive finding with respect to Vinayak D. Savarkar’s role in the assassination of Mahatma Gandhi."

== Life and career ==
=== Early life ===
Savarkar was born into a Marathi Hindu Chitpavan Brahmin family on 28 May 1883 in Bhagur, a village in the Nasik district of the Bombay Presidency of British India. His parents were Damodar and Radhabai Savarkar. Savarkar had two brothers named Ganesh and Narayan, and a sister named Mainabai. He began his activism as a high school student. At the age of 12, he led fellow students in an attack on the village mosque following Hindu-Muslim riots, stating: "We vandalised the mosque to our heart's content." In 1903, in the nearby city of Nasik, Savarkar and Ganesh founded the Mitra Mela, an underground revolutionary organisation, which became Abhinav Bharat Society in 1906. Abhinav Bharat's main objectives were to overthrow British rule and revive Hindu pride.

=== Student activist ===
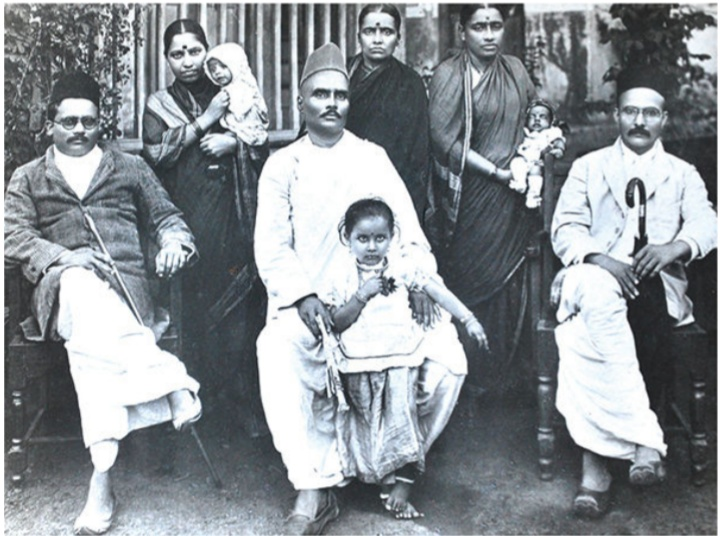
The Savarkar brothers (left to right) Narayan, Ganesh and Vinayak, with Shanta, sister Maina Kale and Yamuna

Savarkar continued his political activism as a student at Fergusson College in Pune. Savarkar was greatly influenced by the radical nationalist leader, Lokmanya Tilak. Tilak was in turn impressed with the young student and helped him obtain the Shivaji Scholarship in 1906 for his law studies in London. To protest against Bengal partition of 1905, Savarkar led foreign-clothes bonfire in India with other students in presence of Bal Gangadhar Tilak.

==== London years ====
In London, Savarkar associated with India House,a centre of Indian nationalist and revolutionary activity located in Highgate, North London. During his time there, he was involved in anticolonial political activities and the dissemination of revolutionary literature. British authorities subsequently identified him as a figure within the Indian revolutionary movement and arrested him in 1910 in connection with his alleged involvement in revolutionary activities. One of the books he published called The Indian War of Independence about the Indian Rebellion of 1857 was banned by the British colonial authorities.

Savarkar was influenced by the life and thinking of Italian nationalist leader, Giuseppe Mazzini. During his stay in London, Savarkar translated Mazzini's biography into Marathi. He also influenced thinking of a fellow student called Madanlal Dhingra. In 1909, Dhingra assassinated Curzon Wyllie, a colonial officer. It is alleged by Mark Juergensmeyer that Savarkar supplied the gun which Dhingra used. Juergensmeyer further alleged that Savarkar supplied the words for Dhingra's last statement before he went to the gallows for the murder. Savarkar met Mohandas Gandhi for the first time in London shortly after Curzon-Wyllie's assassination. During his stay, Gandhi debated Savarkar and other nationalists in London on the futility of fighting the colonial state through acts of terrorism and guerrilla warfare.

==== Arrest and transportation to India ====
In India, Ganesh Savarkar organised an armed revolt against the Morley-Minto reforms of 1909, and was sentenced to life imprisonment on the Andaman Islands. Around the same time Vinayak Savarkar was accused of participating in a conspiracy to overthrow British rule in India by organising murders of various officials. Hoping to evade arrest, Savarkar moved to Bhikaiji Cama's home in Paris, but against advice from his friends, returned to London. On 13 March 1910, he was arrested in London on multiple charges, including procurement and distribution of arms, waging war against the state, and delivering seditious speeches. At the time of his arrest, he was carrying several revolutionary texts, including copies of his own banned books. In addition, the British presented evidence that he had smuggled 20 Browning handguns into India, one of which Anant Laxman Kanhere used to assassinate the Nasik district's collector A.M.T. Jackson in December 1909. During the trial of Nasik Conspiracy Case 1910, government's advocate alleged that Savarkar was a moving part and inspiration behind assassination of Jackson. A Bombay court tried him in the Nasik conspiracy case and sentenced him for life-imprisonment and transported him to the notorious Cellular Jail of Andaman Island and forfeited his property.

Although his alleged crimes were committed both in Britain as well as India, the British decided to try him in India. He was subsequently put on the commercial ship SS Morea with a police escort for his transport to India. When the ship docked in the French Mediterranean port of Marseille, Savarkar escaped by jumping from the ship's window, swam to the French shore, and asked for political asylum. Local French port officials ignored his pleas and handed him back to the police escort on Morea. When the French government was informed of the incident, they asked for Savarkar to be brought back to France, and lodged an appeal with the Permanent Court of Arbitration.

==== French Case before the Permanent Court of Arbitration ====
Savarkar
- Court: Permanent Court of Arbitration
- Full case name: Arrest and Return of Savarkar (France v. Great Britain)
- Decided: 24 February 1911

Case history
- Prior actions: Accused of crime, evading arrest

Court membership
- Judges sitting: M. Beernaert, president, elected by panel Louis Renault; Earl of Desart; G. Gram; Alexander de Savornin Lohman

Case opinions
- Decision by: Unanimous panel

Savarkar's arrest at Marseille caused the French government to lodge a protest against its British counterpart, arguing that Britain could not recover Savarkar unless it took appropriate legal proceedings for his rendition. The dispute came before the Permanent Court of International Arbitration in 1910, and it gave its decision in 1911.

The Court held, firstly, that since there was a pattern of collaboration between the two countries regarding the possibility of Savarkar's escape in Marseille and there was neither force nor fraud in inducing the port authorities to return Savarkar to them, the British did not have to hand him back to the French for the latter to hold rendition proceedings. On the other hand, the tribunal also observed that there had been an "irregularity" in Savarkar's arrest and delivery over to his police escort.

=== Trial and sentence ===
Arriving in Bombay, Savarkar was taken to the Yervada Central Jail in Pune. The trial before the special tribunal was started on 10 September 1910. On 10 February 1911 he was measured as a 5 ft 2.5 in (1.59 m) slender man. One of the charges on Savarkar was the abetment to murder of Nasik Collector A. M. T. Jackson. In July 1911, Savarkar was transported to Port Blair and imprisoned in Cellular Jail.

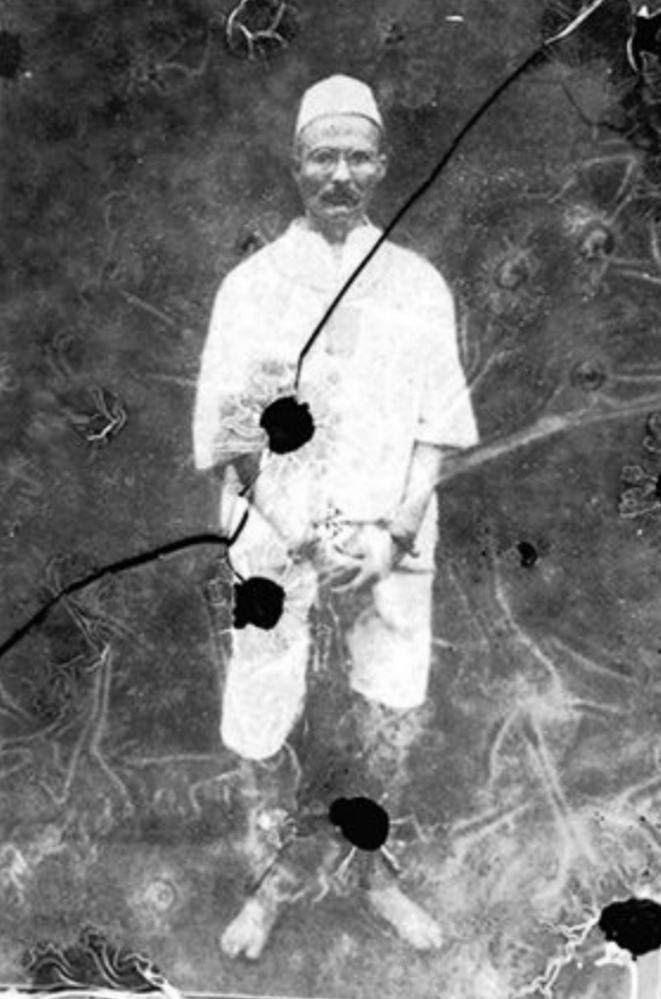
Savarkar in jail clothes

=== Prisoner in Andaman ===
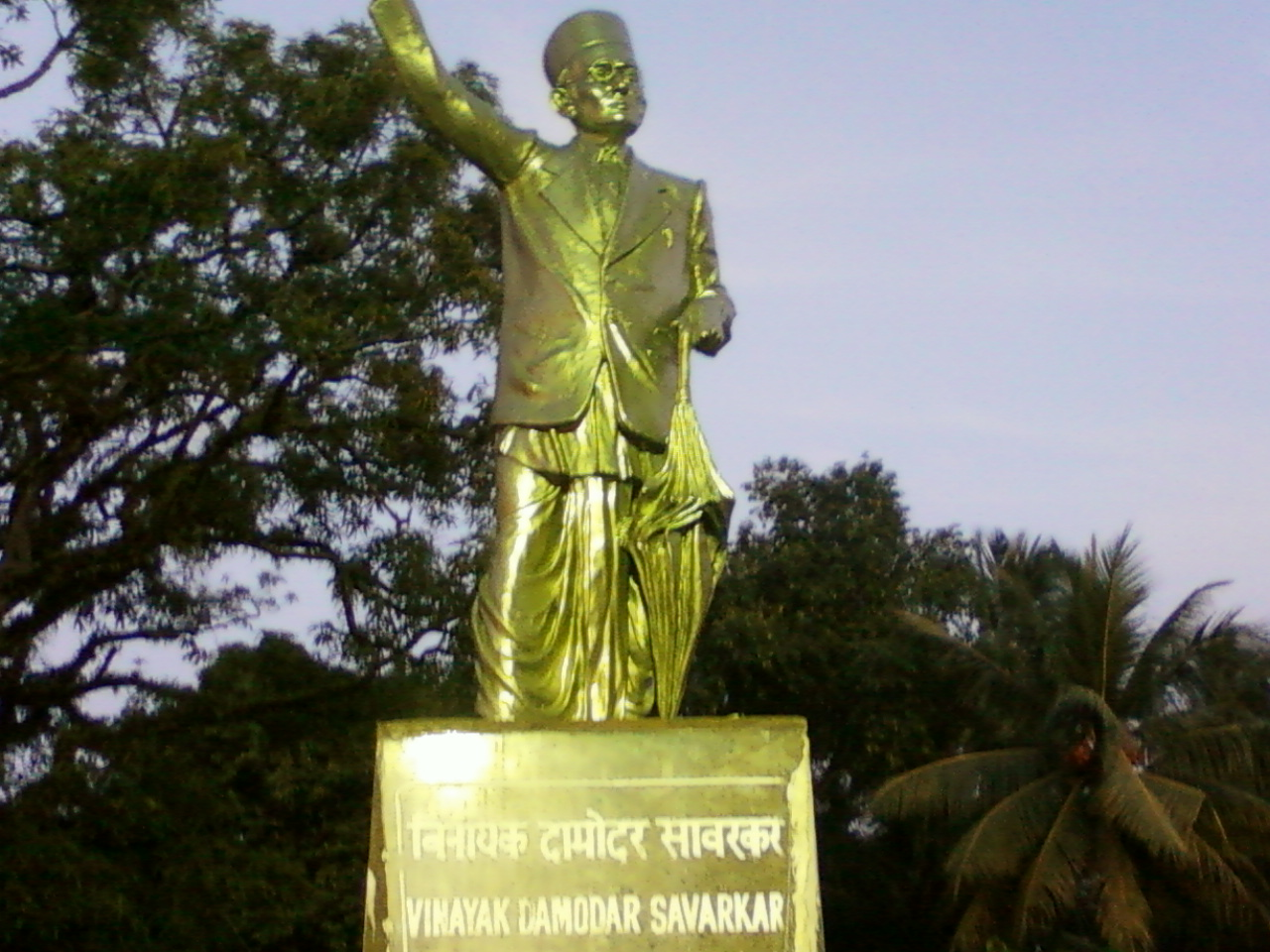
A statue of Vinayak Damodar Savarkar at Cellular Jail.

==== Clemency petitions ====
===== 1911 =====
Savarkar applied to the Bombay Government for certain concessions in connection with his sentences. However, by Government letter No. 2022, dated 4 April 1911, his application was rejected and he was informed that the question of remitting the second sentence of transportation for life would be considered in due course on the expiry of the first sentence of transportation for life. A month after arriving in the Cellular Jail, Andaman and Nicobar Islands, Savarkar submitted his first clemency petition on 30 August 1911. This petition was rejected on 3 September 1911.

===== 1913 =====
Savarkar submitted his next clemency petition on 14 November 1913 and presented it personally to the Home Member of the Governor General's council, Sir Reginald Craddock. In his letter, he described himself as a "prodigal son" longing to return to the "parental doors of the government". (Note: He met Savarkar, who is said to have submitted a clemency plea in which he described himself as the "prodigal son" eager to return "to the parental doors of the Government") He wrote that his release from the jail will recast the faith of many Indians in the British rule. Also, he said

Moreover, my conversion to the constitutional line would bring back all those misled young men in India and abroad who were once looking up to me as their guide. I am ready to serve the government in any capacity they like, for as my conversion is conscientious so I hope my future conduct would be. By keeping me in jail, nothing can be got in comparison to what would be otherwise.

===== 1917 =====
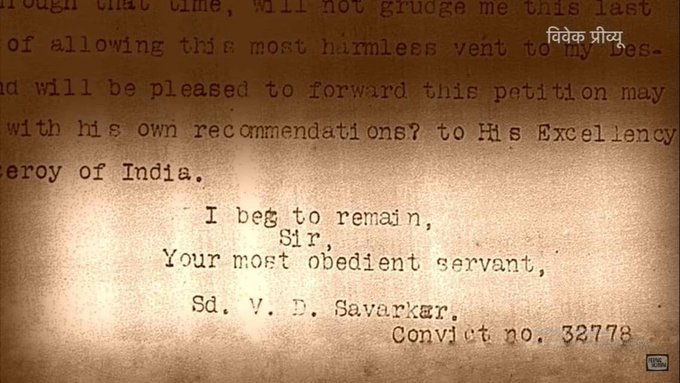
Mercy petition by Savarkar.

In 1917, Savarkar submitted another clemency petition, this time for a general amnesty of all political prisoners. Savarkar was informed on 1 February 1918 that the clemency petition was placed before the British colonial government. In December 1919, there was a Royal proclamation by King George V. The Paragraph 6 of this proclamation included a declaration of Royal clemency to political offenders. In view of Royal proclamation, Savarkar submitted his fourth clemency petition to the British colonial government on 30 March 1920, in which he stated that

So far from believing in the militant school of the Bakunin type, I do not contribute even to the peaceful and philosophical anarchism of a Kuropatkin [sic.] or a Tolstoy. And as to my revolutionary tendencies in the past- it is not only now for the object of sharing the clemency but years before this have I informed of and written to the Government in my petitions (1918, 1914) about my firm intention to abide by the constitution and stand by it as soon as a beginning was made to frame it by Mr. Montagu. Since that the Reforms and then the Proclamation have only confirmed me in my views and recently I have publicly avowed my faith in and readiness to stand by the side of orderly and constitutional development.

This petition was rejected on 12 July 1920 by the British colonial government. After considering the petition, the British colonial government contemplated releasing Ganesh Savarkar but not Vinayak Savarkar. The rationale for doing so was stated as follows

It may be observed that if Ganesh is released and Vinayak is retained in custody, the latter will become in some measure a hostage for the former, who will see that his own misconduct does not jeopardize his brother's chances of release at some future date.

Savarkar signed a statement endorsing his trial, verdict, and British law, and renouncing violence, a bargain for freedom.

=== Ratnagiri years under restrictions ===
On 2 May 1921, the Savarkar brothers were transferred from Andaman to mainland India with Vinayak being sent to a jail in Ratnagiri, and Ganesh to Bijapur Jail. During his incarceration in Ratnagiri jail, Vinayak wrote Essentials of Hindutva that formulated the political ideology of Hindutva. Ganesh Savarkar was unconditionally released from jail in 1922. On 6 January 1924 Vinayak was released, but was restricted to Ratnagiri District. Soon after his release, he shifted his work towards Hindu nationalism. The colonial authorities provided a bungalow for him and he was allowed visitors. He also received a pension of 60 rupees a month from the British government. Nathuram Godse, who later assassinated Gandhi, met Savarkar for the first time as a nineteen-year-old in 1929. Savarkar became a prolific writer during his years of restricted freedom in Ratnagiri. His publishers, however, needed to have a disclaimer that they were wholly divorced from politics. Savarkar remained restricted to Ratnagiri district until 1937. At that time, he was unconditionally released by the newly elected government of Bombay presidency.

=== Leader of the Hindu Mahasabha ===
Savarkar as president of the Hindu Mahasabha, during the Second World War, advanced the slogan "Hinduise all Politics and Militarise Hindudom" and decided to support the British war effort in India seeking military training for the Hindus. When the Congress launched the Quit India movement in 1942, Savarkar criticised it and asked Hindus to stay active in the war effort and not disobey the government; he also urged the Hindus to enlist in the armed forces to learn the "arts of war".

Hindu Mahasabha under Savarkar's leadership organised Hindu Militarisation Boards which recruited armed forces for helping the British in World War 2.

He assailed the British proposals for transfer of power, attacking both the Congress and the British for making concessions to Muslim separatists. Soon after independence, Syama Prasad Mukherjee resigned as vice-president of the Hindu Mahasabha dissociating himself from its Akhand Hindustan (Undivided India) plank, which implied undoing partition.

==== Opposition to Quit India Movement ====
Under Savarkar, the Hindu Mahasabha openly opposed the Quit India Movement and boycotted it officially. Savarkar even went to the extent of writing a letter titled "Stick to your Posts", in which he instructed party members who happened to be "members of municipalities, local bodies, legislatures or those serving in the army ... to stick to their posts" across the country, and not to join the Quit India Movement at any cost.

==== Alliance with Muslim League and others ====
The Indian National Congress won a massive victory in the 1937 Indian provincial elections, decimating the Muslim League and the Hindu Mahasabha. However, in 1939, the Congress ministries resigned in protest against Viceroy Lord Linlithgow's action of declaring India to be a belligerent in the Second World War without consulting the Indian people. This led to the Hindu Mahasabha, under Savarkar's presidency, joining hands with the Muslim League and other parties to form governments, in certain provinces. Such coalition governments were formed in Sindh, NWFP, and Bengal.

In Sindh, Hindu Mahasabha members joined Ghulam Hussain Hidayatullah's Muslim League government. In Savarkar's own words:

Witness the fact that only recently in Sind, the Sind-Hindu-Sabha on invitation had taken the responsibility of joining hands with the League itself in running coalition government

In the North West Frontier Province, Hindu Mahasabha members joined hands with Sardar Aurangzeb Khan of the Muslim League to form a government in 1943. The Mahasabha member of the cabinet was Finance Minister Mehar Chand Khanna.

In Bengal, Hindu Mahasabha joined the Krishak Praja Party led Progressive Coalition ministry of Fazlul Haq in December 1941. Savarkar appreciated the successful functioning of the coalition government.

=== Arrest and acquittal in Gandhi's assassination ===
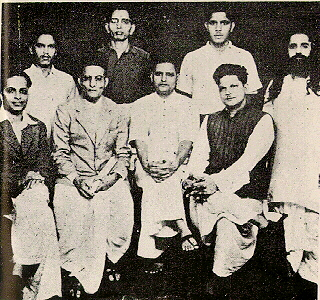
A group photo of people accused in the Mahatma Gandhi's murder case. Standing: Shankar Kistaiya, Gopal Godse, Madanlal Pahwa, Digambar Badge. Sitting: Narayan Apte, Savarkar, Nathuram Godse, Vishnu Karkare

Following the assassination of Gandhi on 30 January 1948, police arrested the assassin Nathuram Godse and his alleged accomplices and conspirators. He was a member of the Hindu Mahasabha and of the Rashtriya Swayamsevak Sangh. Godse was the editor of Agrani – Hindu Rashtra, a Marathi daily from Pune which was run by the company "The Hindu Rashtra Prakashan Ltd" (The Hindu Nation Publications). This company had contributions from such eminent persons as Gulabchand Hirachand, Bhalji Pendharkar, and Jugalkishore Birla. Savarkar had invested ₹ 15000 in the company. Savarkar, a former president of the Hindu Mahasabha, was arrested on 5 February 1948, from his house in Shivaji Park, and kept under detention in the Arthur Road Prison, Bombay. He was charged with murder, conspiracy to murder, and abetment to murder. The mass of papers seized from his house had revealed nothing that could remotely be connected with Gandhi's murder. Due to lack of evidence, Savarkar was arrested under the Preventive Detention Act.

==== Badge's testimony ====
Godse claimed full responsibility for planning and carrying out the assassination. However, according to the Approver Digambar Badge, on 17 January 1948, Nathuram Godse went to have a last darshan (audience/interview) with Savarkar in Bombay before the assassination. While Badge and Shankar waited outside, Nathuram and Apte went in. On coming out Apte told Badge that Savarkar blessed them "Yashasvi houn ya" ("यशस्वी होऊन या", be successful and return). Apte also said that Savarkar predicted that Gandhi's 100 years were over and there was no doubt that the task would be successfully finished. However Badge's testimony was not accepted as the approver's evidence lacked independent corroboration and hence Savarkar was acquitted.

In the last week of August 1974, Mr. Manohar Malgonkar saw Digamber Badge several times and in particular, questioned him about the veracity of his testimony against Savarkar. Badge insisted to Mr. Manohar Malgonkar that "even though he had blurted out the full story of the plot as far as he knew, without much persuasion, he had put up a valiant struggle against being made to testify against Savarkar". In the end, Badge gave in. He agreed to say on oath that he saw Nathuram Godse and Apte with Savarkar and that Savarkar, within Badge's hearing, had blessed their venture.

==== Kapur commission ====
On 12 November 1964, at a religious program organised in Pune to celebrate the release of Gopal Godse, Madanlal Pahwa and Vishnu Karkare from jail after the expiry of their sentences, G. V. Ketkar, grandson of Bal Gangadhar Tilak, former editor of Kesari and then editor of "Tarun Bharat", who presided over the function, gave information of a conspiracy to kill Gandhi, about which he professed knowledge six months before the act. Ketkar was arrested. A public furore ensued both outside and inside the Maharashtra Legislative Assembly and both houses of the Indian parliament. Under the pressure of 29 members of parliament and public opinion the then Union home minister Gulzarilal Nanda appointed Gopal Swarup Pathak, M. P. and a senior advocate of the Supreme Court of India as a Commission of Inquiry to re-investigate the conspiracy to murder Gandhi. The central government intended on conducting a thorough inquiry with the help of old records in consultation with the government of Maharashtra. Pathak was given three months to conduct his inquiry; subsequently, Jevanlal Kapur, a retired judge of the Supreme Court of India, was appointed chairman of the commission.

The commission's reinvestigation saw Savarkar's secretary and bodyguard to have testified that Savarkar met with Godse and Apte right before Gandhi was killed.

The commission was provided with evidence not produced in the court; especially the testimony of two of Savarkar's close aides – Appa Ramachandra Kasar, his bodyguard, and Gajanan Vishnu Damle, his secretary. The testimony of Mr. Kasar and Mr. Damle was already recorded by Bombay police on 4 March 1948, but apparently, these testimonies were not presented before the court during the trial. In these testimonies, it is said that Godse and Apte visited Savarkar on or about 23 or 24 January, which was when they returned from Delhi after the bomb incident. Damle deposed that Godse and Apte saw Savarkar in the middle of January and sat with him (Savarkar) in his garden. The C. I. D. Bombay was keeping vigil on Savarkar from 21 to 30 January 1948. The crime report from C. I. D. does not mention Godse or Apte meeting Savarkar during this time.

Justice Kapur concluded: "All these facts taken together were destructive of any theory other than the conspiracy to murder by Savarkar and his group."

The arrest of Savarkar was mainly based on approver Digambar Badge's testimony. The commission did not re-interview Digambar Badge. At the time of inquiry of the commission, Badge was alive and working in Bombay.

=== Later years ===
After Gandhi's assassination, Savarkar's home in Dadar, Bombay was stoned by angry mobs. After he was acquitted of the allegations related to Gandhi's assassination and released from jail, Savarkar was arrested by the government for making "Hindu nationalist speeches"; he was released after agreeing to give up political activities. He continued addressing the social and cultural elements of Hindutva. He resumed political activism after the ban on it was lifted; it was however limited until his death in 1966 because of ill health.

In 1956, he opposed B. R. Ambedkar's conversion to Buddhism calling it a "useless act", to which Ambedkar responded by publicly questioning the use of epithet ‘Veer’ (meaning brave) by Savarkar.

On 22 November 1957, Raja Mahendra Pratap attempted to introduce a bill in Lok Sabha to recognise the service to the country of people like V D Savarkar, Barindra Kumar Ghosh and Bhupendranath Datta. But the introduction of the bill was defeated with 48 votes favouring it and 75 against it. This introduction of the bill was supported by communist leader like A. K. Gopalan by highlighting the privilege of a member to introduce a private bill. A. K. Gopalan argued about procedural aspects and the unusual opposition to its introduction. However, A. K. Gopalan viewed communal organizations like the Hindu Mahasabha and RSS, with which V.D. Savarkar was associated, are harmful to the nation and was a strong critic of them.

=== Death ===
On 8 November 1963, Savarkar's wife, Yamunabai, died. On 1 February 1966, Savarkar renounced medicines, food, and water which was termed as prayopavesha (fast until death). Before his death, he had written an article titled "Atmahatya Nahi Atmaarpan" in which he argued that when one's life mission is over and the ability to serve society is left no more, it is better to end the life at will rather than waiting for death. His condition was described to have become as "extremely serious" before his death on 26 February 1966 at his residence in Bombay (now Mumbai), and that he faced difficulty in breathing; efforts to revive him failed, and was declared dead at 11:10 a.m. (IST) that day. Prior to his death, Savarkar had asked his relatives to perform only his funeral and do away with the rituals of the 10th and 13th day of the Hindu faith. Accordingly, his last rites were performed at an electric crematorium in Bombay's Sonapur locality by his son Vishwas the following day.

There was no official mourning by the Maharashtra Pradesh Congress Committee or the central government in Delhi during the time of his death. No minister from the Maharashtra Cabinet paid homage to Savarkar. (Note: After his death, since Savarkar was championing militarisation, some thought that it would be fitting if his mortal remains were to be carried on a gun-carriage. A request to that effect was made to the then Defence Minister, Y.B. Chavan. But Chavan turned down the proposal and not a single minister from the Maharashtra Cabinet showed up to the cremation ground to pay homage to Savarkar. In New Delhi, the Speaker of the Lok Sabha turned down a request that it pay homage to Savarkar.) The political indifference to Savarkar has also continued after his death. (Note: When Y.B. Chavan, as the Home Minister of India, went to the Andaman Islands; he was asked whether he would like to visit Savarkar's jail but he was not interested. When Morarji Desai visited as Prime Minister to the Andaman islands, he too refused to visit Savarkar's former prison cell.) After the death of Nehru, the Congress government, under Prime Minister Shastri, started to pay him a monthly pension. The Congress party government under Indira Gandhi also issued a postage stamp in his honour in 1970.

== Political views ==
=== Hindutva ===
In contrast with Dayananda Saraswati, Swami Vivekananda and Sri Aurobindo, who were "men of religion" who introduced reforms in the society and put Hinduism in front of the world, Savarkar formulated an extreme form of Hindu nationalism.

During his incarceration, Savarkar's views began turning increasingly towards Hindu cultural and political nationalism, and the next phase of his life remained dedicated to this cause. In the brief period he spent at the Ratnagiri jail, Savarkar wrote his ideological pamphlet, Essentials of Hindutva. In this work, Savarkar promotes a farsighted new vision of Hindu social and political consciousness. Savarkar began describing a "Hindu" as a patriotic inhabitant of Bharatavarsha, venturing beyond a religious identity. While emphasising the need for patriotic and social unity of all Hindu communities, he described Hinduism, Jainism, Sikhism and Buddhism as one and the same. He outlined his vision of a "Hindu Rashtra" (Hindu Nation) as "Akhand Bharat" (United India), purportedly stretching across the entire Indian subcontinent.

According to Sharma, Savarkar's celebration and justification of violence against [British] women and children in his description of the Mutiny of 1857, "transformed Hindutva into the very image of Islam that he defined and found so intolerably objectionable".

Scholars, historians and Indian politicians have been divided in their interpretation of Savarkar's ideas. A self-described atheist, Savarkar regarded being Hindu as a cultural and political identity. He often stressed social and community unity between Hindus, Sikhs, Buddhists and Jains, to the exclusion of Muslims and Christians. Savarkar saw Muslims and Christians as "misfits" in the Indian civilisation who could not truly be a part of the nation. He argued that the holiest sites of Islam and Christianity are in the Middle East and not India, hence the loyalty of Muslims and Christians to India is divided.

Focusing his energies on writing, Savarkar authored the Hindu Pad-pada-shahi – a book documenting the Maratha empire – and My Transportation for Life – an account of his early revolutionary days, arrest, trial and incarceration. He also wrote and published a collection of poems, plays and novels. He also wrote a book named Majhi Janmathep ("My Life-term") about his experience in Andaman prison.

=== Hindu orthodoxy ===
He was an ardent critique of a number of Hindu religious practices he saw as irrational and viewed them as a hindrance to the material progress of the Hindus. He believed that religion is an unimportant aspect of "Hindu identity".

However, in 1939, Savarkar assured that his party Hindu Mahasabha won't necessarily support entry of the untouchables into temples. Savarkar said, "Thus the Party will not introduce or support compulsory Legislature regarding Temple Entry by the untouchables etc. in old temples beyond the limit to which the non-Hindus are allowed by custom as in force today."

=== Caste ===
Savarkar was opposed to the caste system and was among the foremost staunchly anti-caste activists of his era. He was strongly in opposition of untouchability, condemned casteism, ate food together with dalits in public, and helped established a temple open to all irrespective of caste. He is widely regarded as a caste reformer and progressive in Maharashtra. He encouraged inter-caste marriages amongst Hindus as a way of developing a pan-Hindu identity, and used references to instances of inter-caste marriages in Hindu texts to attack prevailing ideas of caste purity and to argue for a pan-Hindu unity. In a 1931 essay titled Seven Shackles of the Hindu Society, he wrote:

One of the most important components of such injunctions of the past that we have blindly carried on and which deserves to be thrown in the dustbins of history is the rigid caste system.

He was an admirer of anti-caste reformer BR Ambedkar, but resented what he saw as Ambedkar's "occasional anti-Hindu utterances and attitude" and criticised Ambedkar's ideas on Hinduism following Ambedkar's conversion to Buddhism. Ambedkar criticised Savarkar's inclusion of all "depressed classes" in the Hindu fold. Savarkar's views on caste, especially his opposition to untouchability, garnered fierce and at times violent opposition from orthodox Hindus and upper castes.

=== Constitution of India ===
Savarkar in his book, "Women in Manusmriti", he wrote: "The worst about the new constitution of Bharat is that there is nothing Bharatiya (Indian) about it. Manusmriti is that scripture which is most worship-able after Vedas for our Hindu Nation and which from ancient times has become the basis of our culture-customs, thought and practice. This book for centuries has codified the spiritual and divine march of our nation. Even today the rules which are followed by crores of Hindus in their lives and practice are based on Manusmriti." B. R. Ambedkar, Chairman of the committee that drafted the Constitution of India, criticised Manusmriti as responsible for caste system in India.

=== Fascism ===
In a speech on "India's foreign policy" before about 20,000 people in Pune on 1 August 1938, Savarkar stated that "India's foreign policy must not depend on 'isms'" and that Germany had the right to adopt Nazism and Italy to Fascism; such systems were suited to their national conditions and had contributed to their strength and consolidation. Savarkar criticised Nehru for denouncing Germany and Italy, proclaiming that "crores of Hindu Sanghatanists in India [..] cherish[ed] no ill-will towards Germany or Italy or Imperial Japan." He defended Germany's position on Czechoslovakia, stating that Germany was justified in uniting Austrian and Sudeten Germans under its rule and that "the Germans under the Czechs wanted to join their kith and kin in Germany".

As World War II become imminent, Savarkar had initially advocated a policy of neutralism centered on India's geostrategic equations but his rhetoric grew coarser with time and he expressed consistent support for Hitler's policy about Jews. In a speech on 14 October, it was suggested that Hitler's ways be adopted for dealing with Indian Muslims. On 11 December, he characterised the Jews as a communal force. Next March, Savarkar would welcome Germany's revival of Aryan culture, their appropriation of Swastika, and the "crusade" against Aryan enemies; it was hoped that German victory would finally invigorate the Hindus of India.

On 5 August 1939, Savarkar highlighted how a common strand of "thought, religion, language, and culture" was essential to nationality thus preventing the Germans and Jews from being considerable as one nation. By the year end, he was directly equating the Muslims of India with German Jews; in the words of Chetan Bhatt, both were suspected of harbouring extra-national loyalties and became illegitimate presences in an organic nation. These speeches circulated in German newspapers with Nazi Germany even allotting a point-of-contact person for engaging with Savarkar, who was making sincere efforts to forge a working relationship with the Nazis. Eventually, Savarkar would be gifted with a copy of Mein Kampf.

=== Nazis and Jews ===
Savarkar supported Hitler's anti-Jewish policy. In 1939, he deemed that "Germans and the Jews could not be regarded as a nation". In the same year, he compared Indian Muslims with the Jews of Germany by saying "Indian Muslims are on the whole more inclined to identify themselves and their interests with Muslims outside India than Hindus who live next door, like Jews in Germany".

In 1941, Savarkar supported the settlement of Jews in Palestine, in what he believed would defend the world against Islamic aggression. In his letter dated 19 December 1947, Savarkar celebrated "the establishment of the independent Jewish State in Palestine on moral as well as political grounds" while adding that "the Jewish people bear no political ill-will towards Hindudom".

It remains unknown whether Savarkar withdrew his support for Nazi Germany after the Holocaust became common knowledge. However, on 15 January 1961 he had spoken favourably of Hitler's Nazism against Nehru's "cowardly democracy".

=== Two-nation theory ===
In his earlier writings, Savarkar argued for "Indian independence from British rule", whereas in later writings he focused on "Hindu independence from Christians and Muslims". In his 1909 book The Indian War of Independence, Savarkar emphasises Hindu-Muslim unity, stating that they worked together for "freeing their country" during the 1857 uprising. In his introduction to the book, Savarkar states that the feeling of hatred against the Muslims was necessary during Shivaji's period, but it would be "unjust and foolish" to nurse such hatred now.

By 1923, when his Essentials of Hindutva was published, Savarkar no longer emphasised the Hindu-Muslim unity, and primarily focused on "Hindus" rather than "Indians". His writings on Hindutva emerged immediately after he was moved from the Cellular Jail to a prison in Ratnagiri in 1921, and therefore, later scholars have speculated if his stay in these prisons contributed to a change in his views. These scholars point to Savarkar's claims that the Muslim warders at the Cellular Jail treated the Muslim prisoners favourably, while mistreating Hindus; the pan-Islamic Khilafat Movement may have also influenced his views about Muslims while he stayed at Ratnagiri during 1921–1923. According to Bhai Parmanand, his fellow prisoner at the Cellular Jail during 1915–1920, Savarkar had already formed his ideas about Hindutva before they met.

Savarkar in 1937 during the 19th session of the Hindu Mahasabha in Ahmedabad supported two-nation theory. He said:

There are two antagonistic nations living side by side in India. India cannot be assumed today to be a unitarian and homogenous nation. On the contrary, there are two nations in the main: the Hindus and the Muslims, in India.

In the 1940s, the two-nation theory was supported by Muhammad Ali Jinnah and Savarkar. Savarkar declared on 15 August 1943, in Nagpur:

I have no quarrel with Mr Jinnah's two-nation theory. We Hindus are a nation by ourselves and it is a historical fact that Hindus and Muslims are two nations.

Savarkar not only talked of Hindudom, Hindu Nation and Hindu Raj, but he wanted to depend upon the Sikhs in the Punjab to establish a Sikhistan. Savarkar assured the Sikhs that "when the Muslims woke from their day-dreams of Pakistan, they would see established instead a Sikhistan in the Punjab." Savarkar further instigated the Sikhs by claiming that Sikhs previously occupied Afghanistan when they were not many and now there are millions of Sikhs.

=== Muslims ===
Since his time in jail, Savarkar was known for his anti-Muslim writings. Historians including Rachel McDermott, Leonard A. Gordon, Ainslie Embree, Frances Pritchett and Dennis Dalton state that Savarkar promoted an anti-Muslim form of Hindu nationalism.

Savarkar saw Muslims in the Indian police and military to be "potential traitors". He advocated that India reduce the number of Muslims in the military, police and public service and ban Muslims from owning or working in munitions factories. Savarkar criticised Gandhi for being concerned about Indian Muslims. (Note: He described Mahatma Gandhi's nonviolence as "absolutely sinful" and criticised Gandhi's often-expressed concern for the well-being of India's Muslims.)

In his 1963 book Six Glorious Epochs of Indian History, Savarkar says Muslims and Christians wanted to "destroy" Hinduism.

=== Women ===
In a 1937 speech, Savarkar said that "Kitchen and children were the main duties of women" and suggested that they have healthy children. Unlike Bal Gangadhar Tilak who said that women should not be allowed education at all as reading may make them "immoral" and "insubordinate," Savarkar held a less extreme view. Savarkar did not oppose the education of women but suggested that their education focus on how they could be good mothers and create a generation of patriotic children. In an essay titled "Women's beauty and duty," he stated that a woman's main duty was to her children, her home, and her country. As per Savarkar, any woman digressing from her domestic duties was "morally guilty of breach of trust."

In his 1963 book Six Glorious Epochs of Indian History, Savarkar advocated the use of rape as political tool. He accused Muslim women of actively supporting Muslim men's atrocities against Hindu women, Savarkar wrote that young and beautiful Muslim girls should be captured, converted and presented to Maratha warriors to reward them, stating that the Muslim ruler Tipu Sultan had similarly distributed Hindu girls among his warriors. He further wrote:

Let the sultans and their peers take a pledge that in the event of a Hindu victory our molestation and detestable lot shall be avenged on the Muslim women. Once they are haunted with this dreadful apprehension that the Muslim women too, stand in the same predicament in the case the Hindus win, the future Muslim conquerors will never dare to think of such molestation of Hindu women.

As per Sharma, based on Swami Ramdas's teaching, Savarkar justifies the killing of countless British women and children in 1857. Sharma has translated some passages from "Savarkar Samgraha" which is originally in Savarkar's native language into English to give examples.

In Jhansi, 12 women along with 23 children and 75 men were killed. Savarkar calls this killing of the British whites as a Bali or "Holy Sacrifice."

On page 202 of Volume 5, Savarkar Samgraha, in his native language, Savarkar writes (translated by Sharma):

Women had little children in their laps and these children were clinging on to their mothers. These women, infants and older children were guilty of being white and were decapitated with a black sword

When some men, women and children were killed in the Ganga river, Savarkar describes this as a "celebration" of the anniversary of plassey on page 196. In Kanpur, when 150 children and women were killed he quotes unemotionally as per Sharma in his native language that "the butchers entered Bibigarh ..and sea of white blood spread all over." In another incident on 16 May, Savarkar describes the fate of English women and children as follows:

If some woman or child pleaded for mercy, people shouted: "Revenge for Meerut's chains, revenge for slavery, revenge for the ammunition shed." The vengeful sword then decapitated the pleading head

== Legacy ==
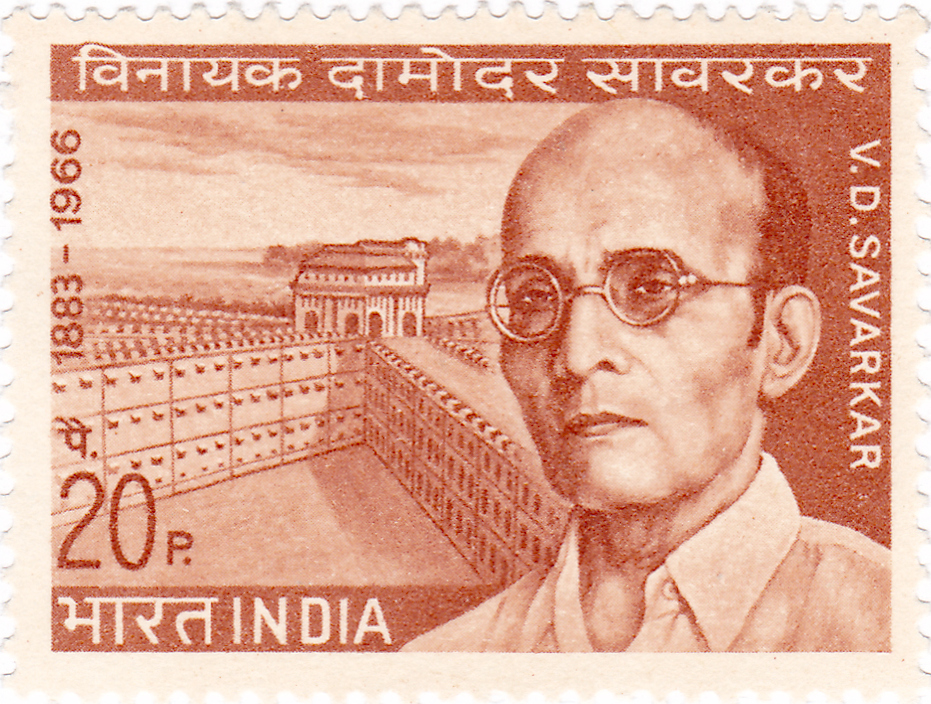
Savarkar on 1970 stamp of India

Savarkar has been called "one of the most divisive figures in Indian politics" and "the most controversial Indian political thinker of the twentieth century."

He is known among his followers by the honorific prefix veer, meaning "brave"; the qualification has been questioned by analysts. The honorific Swatantryaveer was used in the title of a Marathi biography of Savarkar by Sadashiv Rajaram Ranade, published in 1924. Following this, in 1926, two years after his release from prison, Savarkar pseudonymously authored an autobiography entitled "Life of Barrister Savarkar", under the name "Chitragupta". In the book, Chitragupta uses the prefix veer for Savarkar and glorifies him. Chitragupta states, "Savarkar is born hero, he could almost despise those who shirked duty for fear of consequences". He adds that Savarkar "seemed to posses no few distinctive marks of character, such as an amazing presence of mind, indomitable courage, unconquerable confidence in his capability to achieve great things". A second edition of the book was published in 1987. In its preface, Ravindra Vaman Ramdas deduced that "Chitragupta is none other than Veer Savarkar".

The airport at Port Blair, Andaman and Nicobar's capital was renamed Veer Savarkar International Airport in 2002. One of the commemorative blue plaques affixed on India House fixed by the Historic Building and Monuments Commission for England reads "Vinayak Damodar Savarkar, 1883–1966, Indian patriot and philosopher lived here". The Veer Savarkar Sports Complex in Naranpura, Ahmedabad, was named after him.

- A commemorative postage stamp was released by government of India in 1970.
- A portrait of Savarkar was unveiled in the Indian Parliament in 2003.
- The Shiv Sena party has demanded that the Indian Government posthumously confer upon him India's highest civilian award, the Bharat Ratna. Uddhav Thackeray, Shiv Sena chief, while reiterating this demand for Bharat Ratna in 2017, has also suggested that a replica of the prison cell where Savarkar was imprisoned should be built in Mumbai and the youth should be educated about Savarkar's contribution towards the 'Hindu Rashtra' and the Indian freedom struggle.

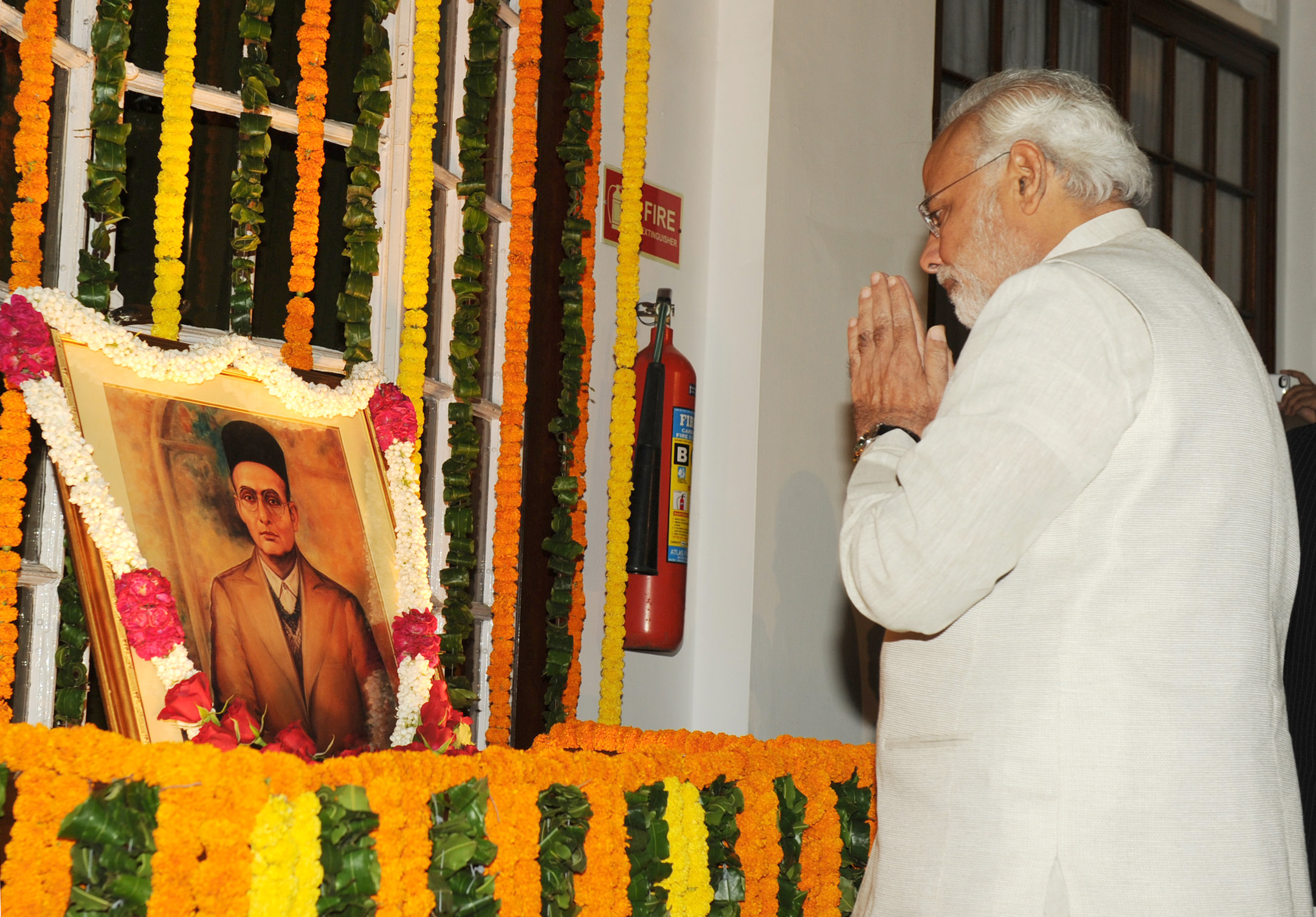
PM Narendra Modi pays homage to Savarkar, on his birth anniversary, at Parliament House, New Delhi on 28 May 2014

=== In popular culture ===
- In the 1996 Malayalam movie Kaalapani directed by Priyadarshan, the Hindi actor Annu Kapoor played the role of Savarkar.
- The Marathi and Hindi music director and Savarkar follower, Sudhir Phadke, and Ved Rahi made the biopic film Veer Savarkar, which was released in 2001 after many years in production. Savarkar is portrayed by Shailendra Gaur.
- The 2015 Indian Marathi-language film What About Savarkar?, directed by Rupesh Katare and Nitin Gawde, depicted the journey of a man's revenge against those who have disrespect Savarkar's name.
- The 2024 Indian Hindi-language film Swatantrya Veer Savarkar directed, co-written, co-produced and acted by Randeep Hooda depicted the life journey of Savarkar.

=== Books ===
He wrote 38 books in English and Marathi.

== Sources ==
- Anderson, C. (2003), The politics of convict space: Indian penal settlements and the Andaman Islands, Routledge (Taylor & Francis), archived from the original on 10 October 2019
- Andersen, Walter (1972), "The Rashtriya Swayamsevak Sangh: III: Participation in Politics", Economic and Political Weekly, 7 (13): 673–682, JSTOR 4361179
- Bakhle, Janaki (2024), Savarkar and the Making of Hindutva, Princeton University Press, ISBN 978-0-691-25149-3.
- Bhave, Y. G (2009), Vinayak Damodar Savarkar: The Much-maligned and Misunderstood Revolutionary and Freedom Fighter, Northern Book Centre, ISBN 978-81-7211-266-0, archived from the original on 16 April 2021
- Chandra, Bipan (1989), India's Struggle for Independence, New Delhi: Penguin Books India, ISBN 978-0-14-010781-4
- Chaturvedi, Vinayak (2022). Hindutva and Violence: V. D. Savarkar and the Politics of History. SUNY Press. ISBN 9781438488776. Archived from the original on 8 April 2023.
- Elder, Joseph W. (2009), "International Handbook of Comparative Education", in Cowen, Robert; Kazamias, Andreas M. (eds.), Hinduism, Modernity and Knowledge: India, Springer Netherlands, ISBN 978-1-4020-6403-6, archived from the original on 16 April 2021
- Gier, Nicholas F. (2014), The Origins of Religious Violence: An Asian Perspective, Lexington Books, ISBN 978-0-7391-9222-1
- Goldie, Louis (1972), "Legal Aspects of the Refusal of Asylum by U.S. Coast Guard on 23 November, 1970", Lithuanian Quarterly Journal of Arts and Sciences, 18 (3), archived from the original on 30 June 2011
- Goodrick-Clarke, Nicholas (1998), Hitler's Priestess: Savitri Devi, the Hindu-Aryan Myth and Neo-Nazism, New York University Press, ISBN 978-0-8147-3111-6
- Grover, Verinder (1993), V.D. Savarkar, Deep & Deep Publications, ISBN 978-81-7100-425-6, archived from the original on 16 April 2021
- Islam, Shamsul (2006), Religious Dimensions of Indian Nationalism: A Study of RSS, Media House, ISBN 978-81-7495-236-3, archived from the original on 15 November 2019
- Jaffrelot, C. (2017), The making of Indian revolutionaries (1885–1931). In Revolutionary Passions, Routledge
- Majumdar, R.C. (1975), Penal Settlements in Andamans, New Delhi: Department of Culture (Government of India)
- Malgonkar, Manohar (2008), The Men Who Killed Gandhi, Roli Books, ISBN 978-93-5194-083-8, archived from the original on 16 April 2021
- McKean, Lise (1996), Divine Enterprise: Gurus and the Hindu Nationalist Movement, University of Chicago Press, ISBN 978-0-226-56009-0, archived from the original on 15 February 2017
- Misra, Amalendu (1999), "Savarkar and the Discourse on Islam in Pre-Independent India", Journal of Asian History, 33 (2): 142–184, JSTOR 41933141
- Noorani, A.G. (8 April 2005), "Savarkar's Mercy Petition", Frontline
- Palande, M.R., ed. (1958), Source Material for a History of the Freedom Movement of India (PDF), vol. 2, Maharashtra: Government of Maharashtra, archived (PDF) from the original on 14 October 2021
- Ranade, Sadashiv Rajaram (1924), A short biography of Swatantraveer Vinakarao Savarkar (in Marathi)
- Salam, Ziya Us (2018). Of Saffron Flags and Skullcaps: Hindutva, Muslim Identity and the Idea of India. SAGE Publishing India. ISBN 978-93-5280-735-2. Archived from the original on 16 April 2021.
- Sengupta, Hindol (2023), Soul and Sword: The Endless Battle over Political Hinduism, London: Rowman & Littlefield
- Sharma, Jyotirmaya (2011), Hindutva: Exploring the Idea of Hindu Nationalism (3rd ed.), Penguin Books India, ISBN 978-0-14-341818-4
- Sinha, Babli (2014), South Asian Transnationalisms: Cultural Exchange in the Twentieth Century, Routledge, ISBN 978-1-135-71832-9, archived from the original on 3 June 2020
- Takle, Niranjan (24 January 2016), "The prodigal son", The Week, archived from the original on 14 February 2021
- Trehan, Jyoti (1991), Veer Savarkar: Thought and Action of Vinayak Damodar Savarkar, Deep & Deep Publications, ISBN 978-81-7100-322-8, archived from the original on 3 June 2020
- Wagner, Kim A. (2010), The Great Fear of 1857: Rumours, Conspiracies and the Making of the Indian Uprising, Peter Lang, ISBN 978-1-906165-27-7, archived from the original on 5 June 2020
- Wolf, Siegfried O. (January 2010), "Vinayak Damodar Savarkar's 'Strategic Agnosticism': A Compilation of his Socio-Political Philosophy and Worldview" (PDF), Heidelberg Papers in South Asian and Comparative Politics, South Asia Institute, Department of Political Science, Heidelberg University, ISSN 1617-5069, Working Paper No. 51, archived (PDF) from the original on 29 February 2020
