= Abhinav Bharat Society =

Secret revolutionary society in India

Abhinav Bharat Society (Young India Society) was an Indian Independence secret society founded by Vinayak Damodar Savarkar and his brother Ganesh Damodar Savarkar in 1904. Initially founded at Nasik as "Mitra Mela", the society grew to include several hundred revolutionaries and political activists with branches in various parts of India, extending to London after Savarkar went to study law. It carried out a few assassinations of British officials, after which the Savarkar brothers were convicted and imprisoned. The society was formally disbanded in 1952.

== History ==
Vinayak Savarkar and Ganesh Savarkar started Mitra Mela, a revolutionary secret society in Nasik in 1899. It was one among several such melas (revolutionary societies) functioning in Maharashtra at that time, which believed in the overthrow of British rule through armed rebellion. In 1904, in a meeting attended by 200 members from various towns in Maharashtra, Vinayak Savarkar renamed it Abhinav Bharat, taking after Giuseppe Mazzini's Young Italy.

In 1906, Vinayak Savarkar left to London to study law. In the same year, he compiled a volume called Mazzini Charitra, a translation of the Italian revolutionary Mazzini's writings with a 25-page introduction added. The book was published in Maharashtra in June 1907 and the first edition of 2,000 copies is said to have sold out within a month. Mazzini's techniques of secret societies and guerrilla warfare were fully embraced by Savarkar. He wrote regular newsletters to his compatriots in India as well as carrying out revolutionary propaganda in London.

== Activities ==
The assassination of Lt. Col. William Curzon-Wyllie, the political aide-de-camp to the Secretary of State for India, was carried out by Madanlal Dhingra on the evening of 1 July 1909, at a meeting of Indian students in the Imperial Institute in London. Dhingra was arrested and later tried and executed. A. M. T. Jackson, the district magistrate of Nasik, was assassinated in India by Anant Laxman Kanhare in 1909 in the historic "Nasik Conspiracy Case".

The investigation into the Jackson assassination revealed the existence of the Abhinav Bharat Society and the role of the Savarkar brothers in leading it. Vinayak Savarkar was found to have dispatched twenty Browning pistols to India, one of which was used in the Jackson assassination. He was charged in the Jackson murder and sentenced to "transportation" for life. Savarkar was imprisoned in the Cellular Jail in the Andaman Islands in 1910.

== Sources ==
- Bapu, Prabhu (2013), Hindu Mahasabha in Colonial North India, 1915-1930: Constructing Nation and History, Routledge, ISBN 978-0-415-67165-1
- Jayapalan, N (2001), History Of India (from National Movement To Present Day), vol. IV, New Delhi, India: Atlantic Publishers & Distributors, ISBN 81-7156-928-5
- Jaffrelot, Christofer (1996), The Hindu Nationalist Movement and Indian Politics, C. Hurst & Co. Publishers, ISBN 1-85065-301-1
- Sharma, Jyotirmaya (2006), Hindutva: Exploring the Idea of Hindu Nationalism, Penguin Books India, ISBN 0143099639
- Teltumbde, Anand (2005), "Hindutva Agenda and Dalits", in Ram Puniyani (ed.), Religion, Power and Violence: Expression of Politics in Contemporary Times, SAGE, pp. 208–224, ISBN 0761933387
