= List of Sahitya Akademi Award winners for Dogri =

List of winners of a literary honor in India

Sahitya Akademi Award for Dogri
- Award for contributions to Dogri literature
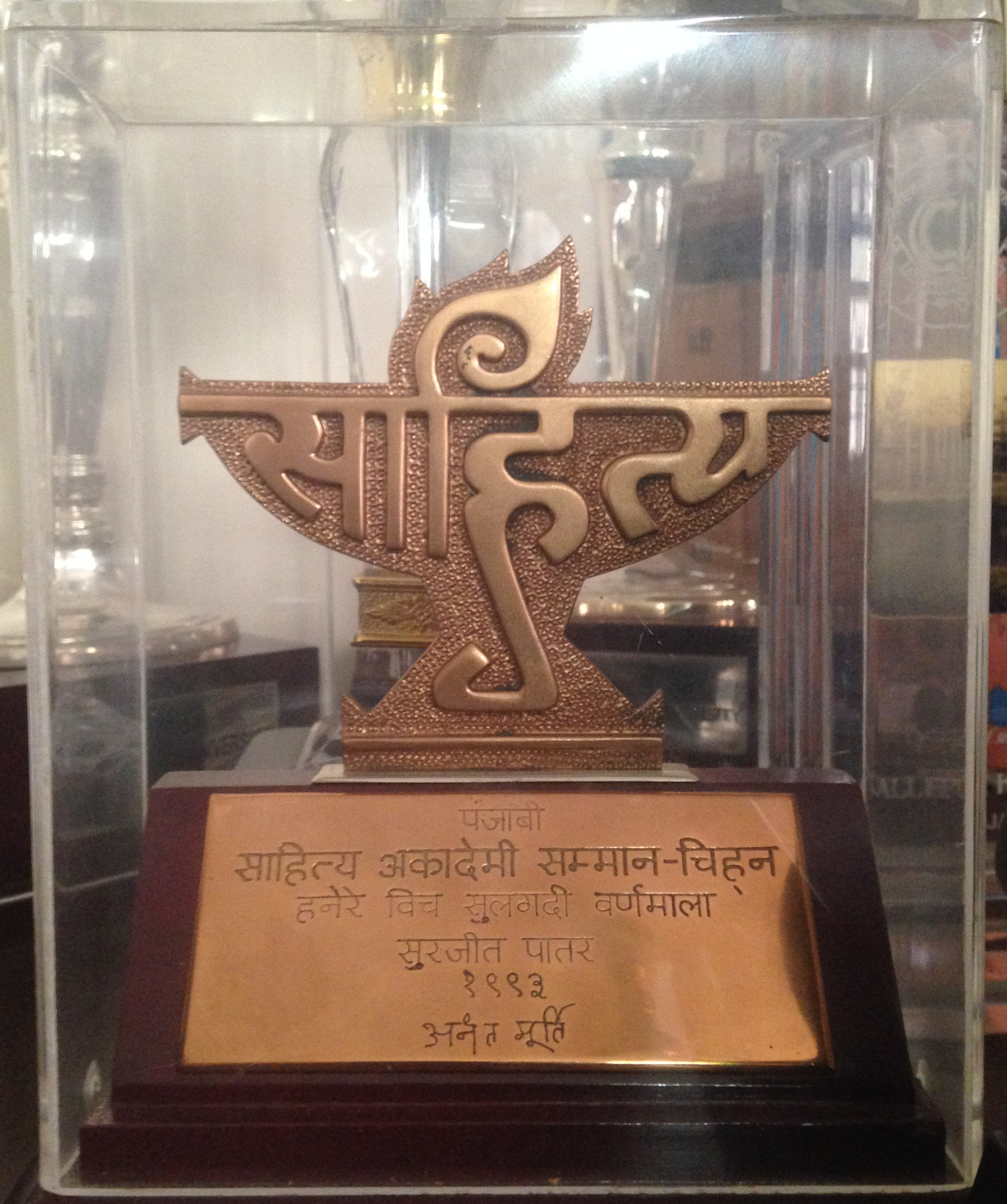
- Awarded for: Literary award in India
- Sponsored by: Sahitya Akademi, Government of India
- Reward: ₹1 lakh (US$1,100)
- First award: 1970
- Final award: 2023

Highlights
- Total awarded: 51
- First winner: Narendra Khajuria
- Most Recent winner: Vijay Verma
- Website: Official website

Part of a series on

Sahitya Akademi Awards
Category
Sahitya Akademi Award winners by language
- Assamese
- Bengali
- Bodo
- Dogri
- English
- Gujarati
- Hindi
- Kannada
- Kashmiri
- Konkani
- Maithili
- Malayalam
- Marathi
- Meitei (Manipuri)
- Nepali
- Odia
- Punjabi
- Rajasthani
- Sanskrit
- Santali
- Sindhi
- Tamil
- Telugu
- Urdu
Sahitya Akademi Translation Prizes
- Assamese
- Bengali
- Bodo
- Dogri
- English
- Gujarati
- Hindi
- Kannada
- Kashmiri
- Konkani
- Maithili
- Malayalam
- Marathi
- Meitei (Manipuri)
- Nepali
- Odia
- Punjabi
- Rajasthani
- Sanskrit
- Santali
- Sindhi
- Tamil
- Telugu
- Urdu
Sahitya Akademi Yuva Puraskar
- Assamese
- Bengali
- Bodo
- Dogri
- English
- Gujarati
- Hindi
- Kannada
- Kashmiri
- Konkani
- Maithili
- Malayalam
- Meitei (Manipuri)
- Marathi
- Nepali
- Odia
- Punjabi
- Rajasthani
- Sanskrit
- Santali
- Sindhi
- Tamil
- Telugu
- Urdu
Sahitya Akademi Bal Sahitya Puraskar
- Assamese
- Bengali
- Bodo
- Dogri
- English
- Gujarati
- Hindi
- Kannada
- Kashmiri
- Konkani
- Maithili
- Malayalam
- Meitei (Manipuri)
- Marathi
- Nepali
- Odia
- Punjabi
- Rajasthani
- Sanskrit
- Santali
- Sindhi
- Tamil
- Telugu
- Urdu
Related
- Eighth Schedule to the Constitution of India
- Official Languages Commission
- List of languages by number of native speakers in India

Sahitya Akademi Award is given by the Sahitya Akademi, India's national academy of letters, to one writer every year in each of the languages recognized by it, as well as for translations. The Sahitya Akademi Award is the second highest literary award of India after the Jnanpith Award, and is annually conferred on writers of outstanding works in one of the twenty four major Indian languages that the Sahitya Akademi supports.

The Sahitya Akademi Award to Dogri writers is awarded to Dogri writers for works in Dogri and English. The award for Dogri language started in 1970. No awards were given in 1973, 1993 and 1998. The award may also be given to translations from Dogri literature.

== Winners ==
Year	Book	Portrait	Author	Category of Books
1970	Nila Ambar Kale Badal	—	Narendra Khajuria	Short stories
1971	Meri Kavita Mere Geet		Padma Sachdev	Poetry
1972	Phull Bina Dali	—	Srivats Vikal	Novel
1974	Duddh, Lahoo, Zahar	—	Madan Mohan Sharma	Short stories
1975	Mere Dogri Geet	—	Kishan Smail Puri	Poetry
1976	Badnami Di Chhan		Ram Nath Shastri	Short stories
1977	Main Mele Ra Janun	—	Kehri Singh ‘Madhukar’	Poetry
1978	Sanjhi Dharti Bakhle Mahnu	—	Narsingh Dev Jamwal	Novel
1979	Nanga Rukh	—	O. P. Sharma ‘Sarathi’	Novel
1980	Ghar		Kunwar Viyogi	Poetry
1981	Ek Shehr Yaaden Da	—	Jitendra Udhampuri	Poetry
1982	Qaidi	—	Deshbandhu Dogra ‘Nutan’	Novel
1983	Aale	—	Ved Rahi	Short stories
1984	Gamlen De Cactus	—	Shiv Ram ‘Deep’	Poetry
1985	Ayodhya	—	Dinoo Bhai Pant	Play
1986	Sunne Di Chiree	—	Om Goswami	Short stories
1987	Beddan Dharti Di	—	Prakash Premi	Epic
1988	Rattu Da Chanan	—	Ram Lal Sharma	Poetry
1989	Sodh Samundaren Di	—	Mohanlal Sapolia	Poetry
1990	Jeevan Lehran	—	Tara Smailpuri	Poetry
1991	Apni Daphli Apna Raag	—	Mohan Singh	Plays
1992	Jo Tere Man-Chitta Laggi Ja	—	Yash Sharma	Poetry
1994	Buddh Suhagan	—	Jitendra Sharma	Plays
1995	Lalsa	—	Abhishap	Poetry
1996	Baddali Kalave	—	Gianeshwar	Poetry
1997	Bakhre Bakhre Sach	—	Shiv Dev Singh Sushil	Novel
1999	Mangwi Pashakri	—	Kuldeep Singh Jindhrahia	Poetry
2000	Meel Patthar	—	Deen Bandhu Sharma	Short stories
2001	Nighe Rang	—	Verinder Kesar	Poetry
2002	Trip Trip Chete	—	Om Vidyarthi	Travelogue
2003	Jhull Bada Dea Pattara	—	(Late) Ashwani Magotra	Poetry
2004	Cheten Di Chitkabri	—	Shiv Nath	Essays
2005	Dhaldi Dhuppe Da Sek	—	Krishan Sharma	Short Stories
2006	Kore Kaakal Korian Talian	—	Darshan Darshi	Poetry
2007	Mahatma Vidur	—	Gian Singh Pagoch	Epic
2008	Cheten Di Rhol	—	Champa Sharma	Poetry
2009	Geet Sarovar	—	Praduman Singh Jindrahia	Lyrics and songs
2010	Pandran Kahaniyan	—	Manoj	Short stories
2011	Cheten Diyan Ga’liyan	—	Lalit Magotra	Essays
2012	Tim-Tim Karde Tare	—	Bal Krishan Bhaura	Poetry
2013	Doha Satsai	—	Sitaram Sapolia	Poetry
2014	Hashiye Par	—	Shailender Singh	Novel
2015	Parchhamen Di Lo	—	Dhian Singh	Poetry
2016	Cheta	—	Chhatrapal	Short Stories
2017	Banna	—	Shiv Mehta	Short Stories
2018	Bhagirath		Inderjeet Kesar	Novel
2019	Bandaralta Darpan	—	Om Sharma Jandriari	Essays
2020	Baba Jitamal	—	Gian Singh	Play
2021	Namme Tunnel	—	Raj Rahi	Short Stories
2022	Chhe Roopak	—	Veena Gupta	Drama
2023	Daun Sadiyan Ek Seer	—	Vijay Verma	Poetry
2024	Ik Hor Ashwatthama	—	Chaman Arora	Short Stories
2025	Khajur Singh Thakur		Khajur Singh Thakur	Poetry, Couplets
