= Sankrityayan =

Sankrityayan is a surname. Notable people with this surname include:

- Kamala Sankrityayan (1930–2009), an Indian writer and scholar
- Rahul Sankrityayan (1893–1963), an Indian travel writer

== See also ==
- Mahapandit Rahul Sankrityayan Award, an award named after Rahul Sankrityayan
