= List of Sahitya Akademi Translation Prize winners for Punjabi =

List of winners of a literary honor in India

Part of a series on

Sahitya Akademi Awards
Category
Sahitya Akademi Award winners by language
- Assamese
- Bengali
- Bodo
- Dogri
- English
- Gujarati
- Hindi
- Kannada
- Kashmiri
- Konkani
- Maithili
- Malayalam
- Marathi
- Meitei (Manipuri)
- Nepali
- Odia
- Punjabi
- Rajasthani
- Sanskrit
- Santali
- Sindhi
- Tamil
- Telugu
- Urdu
Sahitya Akademi Translation Prizes
- Assamese
- Bengali
- Bodo
- Dogri
- English
- Gujarati
- Hindi
- Kannada
- Kashmiri
- Konkani
- Maithili
- Malayalam
- Marathi
- Meitei (Manipuri)
- Nepali
- Odia
- Punjabi
- Rajasthani
- Sanskrit
- Santali
- Sindhi
- Tamil
- Telugu
- Urdu
Sahitya Akademi Yuva Puraskar
- Assamese
- Bengali
- Bodo
- Dogri
- English
- Gujarati
- Hindi
- Kannada
- Kashmiri
- Konkani
- Maithili
- Malayalam
- Meitei (Manipuri)
- Marathi
- Nepali
- Odia
- Punjabi
- Rajasthani
- Sanskrit
- Santali
- Sindhi
- Tamil
- Telugu
- Urdu
Sahitya Akademi Bal Sahitya Puraskar
- Assamese
- Bengali
- Bodo
- Dogri
- English
- Gujarati
- Hindi
- Kannada
- Kashmiri
- Konkani
- Maithili
- Malayalam
- Meitei (Manipuri)
- Marathi
- Nepali
- Odia
- Punjabi
- Rajasthani
- Sanskrit
- Santali
- Sindhi
- Tamil
- Telugu
- Urdu
Related
- Eighth Schedule to the Constitution of India
- Official Languages Commission
- List of languages by number of native speakers in India

Sahitya Akademi Translation Prizes are given each year to writers for their outstanding translations work in the 24 languages, since 1989.

== Recipients ==
Following is the list of recipients of Sahitya Akademi translation prizes for their works written in Punjabi. The award, as of 2019, consisted of ₹50,000.

Year	Translator	Title of the translation	Original Title	Original Language	Genre	Original Author	References
1989	Rattan Singh Jaggi	Tulasi Ramayan	Ramcharitmanas	Awadhi	Epic	Tulsidas	
1990	Amar Bharati	Ikki Kahaniyan	Collection	Bengali	Short stories	Rabindranath Tagore	
1991	Govind Nath Rajguru	Natya Shastra	Natya Shastra	Sanskrit	Text	Bharata Muni	
1992	Nav Rattan Kapur	Rasa Siddhant	Rosa Siddhant	Hindi	treatise on Poetics	Nagendra	
1993	Nav Rattan Kapur	Jawaharlal Nehru	Jawaharlal Nehru: A Biography	English	Biography	S Gopal	
1994	Pritam Singh	Haddian Te Phul	Kahani Sanchayan	Urdu	Short Stories	Rajinder Singh Bedi	
1995	Gursharan Kaur Jaggi	Premchand: Kalam Da Sipahi	Premchand: Kalam Ka Sipahi	Hindi	Biography	Amrit Rai	
1996	Surjit Sarna	Muktibodh	Muktibodh	Hindi	Novel	Jainendra Kumar	
1997	Karanjit Singh	Bhalak Dian Hoian Beatian	Collection	English	Science fiction	Various authors	
1998	Loveleen Jolly	Durg da Patan	Durgaastamana	Kannada	Novel	T.R. Subba Rao	
1999	Baldev Singh Badan	Ranbhoomi	Ranangan	Marathi	Novel	Vishram Bedekar	
2000	Devinder	Patjhar Di Awaz	Patjhar Di Awaz	Urdu	Short stories	Qurratulain Hyder	
2001	Swarn Singh	Agarkar Lekh Sangrah	Agarkar Lekh Sangrah	Marathi	Prose	Gopal Ganesh Agarkar	
2002	Gulwant ‘Farigh’	Ardhnarishwar	Ardhnarishwar	Hindi	Novel	Vishnu Prabhakar	
2003	Iqbal Deep	Gian Singh Shatir	Gian Singh Shatir	Urdu	Novel	Gian Singh Shatir	
2004	Jagbir Singh	Sanrachnavad, Uttar Saranchnavad	Sakhtiyat, Pas-Sakhtiyat Aur Mashriqi Sheriyat Ate Poorvi Kav Shastar	Urdu	Literary Criticism	Gopi Chand Narang	
2005	Piara Singh	Sikh History	A History of the Sikhs (Vol. I & II)	English	History	Khushwant Singh	
2006	Kirpal Singh Kasel	Gur-Sabad Vismad-Bodh	Book of Ten Masters	English	Poetry & Prose	Puran Singh	
2007	Dalbir Singh	Damu Acchut Te Usdi Aulaad Da Jivannama	Aamcha Baap Aan Amhi	Marathi	Memoir	Narendra Jadhav	
2008	Vanita	Peele Patte Da Supna	Collection	Malayalam	Poetry	K. Satchidanandan	
2009	Shah Chaman	Karbala	Karbaia	Hindi	Novel	Premchand	
2010	Prem Gorkhi	Kissa Gulam	Kissa Gulam	Hindi	Novel	Ramesh Chandra Shah	
2011	Gurbax Singh Frank	Bhart Nikky Kahani	Umrao Jaan Ada	Various Languages	Anthology of Short Stories	Ed. by E.V. Ramakrishnan	
2012	Satish Kumar Verma	Rangmanch Da Kohinoor : Prithiviraj Kapoor	Theatre Ke Sirtaj- Prithviraj	Hindi	Biography	Yog Raj	
2013	Balbir Madhopuri	Rajkamal Chaudhary Dian Chonvian Kahaniyan	Rajkamal Choudhary Ki Chuninda Kahaniyan	Hindi	Short stories	Rajkamal Choudhary	
2014	Tarsem	Man Da Mannukh	Moner Manush	Bengali	Novel	Sunil Gangopadhyay	
2015	Balbir Parwana	Manoj Das Dian Kahaniyan	Manoj Dasanka Galpa	Odia	Short stories	Manoj Das	
2016	Amarjeet Kaunke	Aurat Mere Andar	Istri Mere Bhitar	Hindi	Poetry	Pawan Karan	
2017	Jinder	Ramdarash Mishra Dian Chonvian Kahanian	Ramdarash Mishra : Sankalit Kahaniyan	Hindi	Short stories	Ramdarash Mishra	
2018	K. L. Garg	Gopal Parsad Vyas Da Chonvan Haas Viang	Gopal Parsad Vyas Kee Chonvian Hasya Vyang	Hindi	Satire	Gopal Prasad Vyas	
2019	Prem Parkash	Desh Vand De Lahoo De Rang	Desh Vand De Lahoo De Rang	Urdu	Short stories	Saadat Hasan Manto	
2020	Mohinder Bedi	Ravi Virsa	Ravi Virsa	Hindi	Novel	Asghar Wajahat	
2021	Bhajanbir Singh	Pratinidhi Kahaniyan	Pratinidhi Kahaniya	Hindi	Short stories	Uday Prakash	
2022	Bhupinder Kaur 'Preet'	Nagaare Wang Vajde Shabad	Nagde Ki Tarah Bajde Shabad	Hindi	Poetry	Nirmala Putul	
2023	Jagdish Rai Kulrian	Gulara Begum	Gulara Begum	Hindi	Novel	Sharad Pagare	
2024	Chandan Negi	Tere Laee	Tumhare Liye	Hindi	Novel	Himanshu Joshi	

== See also ==
- List of Sahitya Akademi Award winners for Punjabi
