= List of Sahitya Akademi Translation Prize winners for Dogri =

List of winners of a literary honor in India

Part of a series on

Sahitya Akademi Awards
Category
Sahitya Akademi Award winners by language
- Assamese
- Bengali
- Bodo
- Dogri
- English
- Gujarati
- Hindi
- Kannada
- Kashmiri
- Konkani
- Maithili
- Malayalam
- Marathi
- Meitei (Manipuri)
- Nepali
- Odia
- Punjabi
- Rajasthani
- Sanskrit
- Santali
- Sindhi
- Tamil
- Telugu
- Urdu
Sahitya Akademi Translation Prizes
- Assamese
- Bengali
- Bodo
- Dogri
- English
- Gujarati
- Hindi
- Kannada
- Kashmiri
- Konkani
- Maithili
- Malayalam
- Marathi
- Meitei (Manipuri)
- Nepali
- Odia
- Punjabi
- Rajasthani
- Sanskrit
- Santali
- Sindhi
- Tamil
- Telugu
- Urdu
Sahitya Akademi Yuva Puraskar
- Assamese
- Bengali
- Bodo
- Dogri
- English
- Gujarati
- Hindi
- Kannada
- Kashmiri
- Konkani
- Maithili
- Malayalam
- Meitei (Manipuri)
- Marathi
- Nepali
- Odia
- Punjabi
- Rajasthani
- Sanskrit
- Santali
- Sindhi
- Tamil
- Telugu
- Urdu
Sahitya Akademi Bal Sahitya Puraskar
- Assamese
- Bengali
- Bodo
- Dogri
- English
- Gujarati
- Hindi
- Kannada
- Kashmiri
- Konkani
- Maithili
- Malayalam
- Meitei (Manipuri)
- Marathi
- Nepali
- Odia
- Punjabi
- Rajasthani
- Sanskrit
- Santali
- Sindhi
- Tamil
- Telugu
- Urdu
Related
- Eighth Schedule to the Constitution of India
- Official Languages Commission
- List of languages by number of native speakers in India

Sahitya Akademi Translation Prizes are given each year to writers for their outstanding translations work in the 24 languages, since 1989.

== Recipients ==
Following is the list of recipients of Sahitya Akademi translation prizes for their works written in Dogri. The award, as of 2019, consisted of ₹50,000.

Year	Translator	Title of the translation	Original Title	Original Language	Genre	Original Author	Ref.
1989	Ram Nath Shastri	Mitti Di Gaddi	Mrichchakatikam	Sanskrit	Play	Shudraka	
1990	Vishwanath Khajuri	Neela Kamal	Maila Anchal	Hindi	Novel	Phanishwar Nath Renu	
1991	Shyamlal Sharma	Shakuntala Natak	Abhijnanashakuntalam	Sanskrit	Play	Kalidasa	
1996	Usha Vyas	Patjhar Di Awaz	Patjhar Di Awaz	Urdu	Short Stories	Qurratulain Hyder	
1997	(Late) Narender Sharma	Volga Thama Ganga	Volga Se Ganga	Hindi	Novel	Rahul Sankrityayan	
1998	Shakti Sharma	Alok Parva	Alok Parva	Hindi	Essays	Hazari Prasad Dwivedi	
1999	Padma Sachdev	Akhar Gaas	Shabdar Akash	Oriya	Poetry	Sitakant Mahapatra	
2000	Hans Raj Pandotra	Gosain De Bagha Da Bhoot	Gosain Baganer Bhoot	Bengali	Novel	Shirshendu Mukhopadhyay	
2001	Mohan Singh	Machhere	Chemmeen	Malayalam	Novel	Thakazhi Sivasankara Pillai	
2004	Jitendra Sharma	Laio Phi Suno	Baaz Goyee	Urdu	Short Stories	Surendra Prakash	
2008	No Award						
2009	Om Goswami	Agg Goah	Agnisakshi	Malayalam	Novel	Lalithambika Antharjanam	
2010	Prakash Premi	Dehri Da Deeva	Marhi Da Deeva	Punjabi	Novel	Gurdial Singh	
2011	Jitendra Udhampuri	Do Gaz Zameen	Do Gaz Zameen	Urdu	Novel	Abdus Samad	
2012	Shashi Pathania	Namen Juge De Baras	Naven Jug De Waris	Punjabi	Short Stories	Mohinder Singh ‘Sarna’	
2013	Veena Gupta	Kalkatte Di Kahani: Via Bypass	Kali Katha Vai Bypass	Hindi	Novel	Alka Saraogi	
2014	Yashpaul Nirmal	Mian Deedo	Deedo Jamwal	Punjabi	Play	Kripa Sagar	
2015	Chhatrapal	Kinne Pakistan	Kitne Pakistan	Hindi	Novel	Kamaleshwar	
2016	Krishan Sharma	Kaale Kaan Te Kaala Pani	Kavve Aur Kaala Pani	Hindi	Short Stories	Nirmal Verma	
2017	Yash Raina	Pichhlag	Angaliat	Gujarati	Novel	Joseph Macwan	
2018	Narsingh Dev Jamwal	Pahkeru	Pakheru	Urdu	Short Stories	Ramlal	
2019	Rattan Lal Basotra	Satisare Di Kahaani	Katha Satisar	Hindi	Novel	Chandarkanta	
2020	Puspito Mukhopadhyay	Galib Patrabali	Khutut E Galib	Urdu	Collection of Letters by Mirza Ghalib	Khaliq Anjum	
2021	Neelam Sarin	Pakistan Di Hakikat Kanne Ru-Ba-Ru	Pakistan Ki Hakikat Se Ru-Ba-Ru	Hindi	Travelogue	Satish Verma	
2022	Nirmal Vinod	Dehra Ch Ajj Bi Ugade N Saarhe Boohte	Our Trees Still Grow in Dehra	English	Short Stories	Ruskin Bond	
2023	Sushma Rani	Dhan Delhi De Keengre	Dhaawaan Dilli De Kingrey	Punjabi	Noval	Baldev Singh	
2024	Archana Kesar	Tamas	Tamas	Hindi	Noval	Bhisham Sahni	

== See also ==
- List of Sahitya Akademi Award winners for Dogri
