= Virendra Kumar =

Virendra Kumar may refer to:

- Virendra Kumar Baranwal (born 1941), Indian poet and writer
- Virendra Kumar Choudhary (born 1953), Indian politician, a member of parliament from Jhanjharpur (Lok Sabha constituency)
- Virendra Kumar Khatik (born 1954), Indian politician from Tikamgarh Lok Sabha constituency, Tikamgarh
- Virendra Kumar Jaati, Indian politician from Jhabrera Assembly constituency, Uttarakhand
- Virendra Kumar Sakhlecha (1930–1999), an Indian politician who served as the 10th Chief Minister Of Madhya Pradesh
- Virendra Kumar Sharma (born 1947), British-Indian Labour Party politician
- Virendra Kumar Singh (born 1953), Indian politician and former MLA of Nabinagar Assembly constituency, Bihar
- Virendra Kumar Tewari (born 1955), agricultural engineer, professor and director at IIT Kharagpur
- Virendra Kumar Yadav (born 1976), Indian politician and member of the 17th Legislative Assembly of Uttar Pradesh

== See also ==
- Virendra (disambiguation)
- Birendra Kumar (disambiguation)
