= Birendra Kumar =

Birendra Kumar may refer to:

- Birendra Kumar (Bihar politician), Indian politician from Bihar
- Birendra Kumar Bhattacharya (1924–1997), Indian writer
- Birendra Kumar Bhuyan (1933–1991), Indian writer, poet and lyricist
- Birendra Kumar Chaudhary (born 1953), Indian politician
- Birendra Kumar Sinha (born 1968), Indian politician
- Birendra Kumar Kanodia, Nepalese politician

== See also ==
- Birendra (disambiguation)
- Virendra Kumar (disambiguation)
