= Birendra (disambiguation) =

Birendra (1945 – 2001) was king of Nepal from 1972 until 2001.

Birendra may also refer to:

== People ==
- Birendra Bijoy Biswas, Indian molecular biologist and geneticist
- Birendra Lakra, Indian professional field hockey player
- Birendra Kishore Manikya, throne of the Kingdom of Tripura
- Birendra Krishna Bhadra, Indian radio broadcaster, playwright, actor, narrator and theatre director
- Birendra Kumar (disambiguation)
- Birendra Nath Mallick, Indian neurobiologist
- Birendra Nath Datta, Indian academician, linguist, researcher of folklore, singer and lyricist
- Birendranath Sasmal, Indian politician and lawyer
- Birendra Shah, Nepalese journalist
- Birendra Singh Rana, Indian politician
- Birendranath Sircar, Indian film producer

== Others ==
- Birendra Sainik Awasiya Mahavidyalaya, military boarding high school in Nepal
- Birendranagar, city in Karnali province of Nepal

== See also ==
- Virendra (disambiguation), alternative form of the name
