= Kithora =

- village
- Country: India
- State: Uttar Pradesh

Government
  - Body: Gram panchayat

Languages
  - Official: Hindi
- Time zone: UTC+5:30 (IST)
- PIN: 251315
- Vehicle registration: UP
- Website: up.gov.in

Kithora is a village in Jansath tehsil, near Miranpur town, Muzaffarnagar district, Uttar Pradesh, India. It is inhabited by Sayyids of the Chhatrudi clan of Barha Sayyids, and home to some beautiful medieval monuments.

Sayyid Nusratyar Khan, governor of Azimabad (now Patna) in Emperor Muhammad Shah's period (1720 to 1739) belonged to this village.
