= Rattan Singh Jaggi =

Indian scholar and author (1927–2025)

Dr. Rattan Singh Jaggi
- ਰਤਨ ਸਿੰਘ ਜੱਗੀ
- Born: 27 July 1927; Pindigheb, Campbellpur District, Punjab Province, British India (now in Punjab, Pakistan)
- Died: 22 May 2025 (aged 97); Chandigarh, India
- Occupations: Scholar, author, literary critic
- Known for: Commentaries on Sikh scriptures, encyclopedic works
- Awards: Padma Shri (2023), Sahitya Akademi Award (1989), Punjabi Sahit Rattan (1996)

Academic background
- Education: Panjab University (Chandigarh) (PhD), Magadh University (D.Litt.)
- Thesis: Critical study of Pauranik compositions in Dasam Granth (1962) (1962)
- Website: rattansinghjaggi.com

Rattan Singh Jaggi (27 July 1927 – 22 May 2025) was an Indian scholar, author, literary critic and academic specialising in Punjabi, Hindi and Gurmat literature. He was known for his research, publications, and multi-volume commentaries on Sikh scriptures and related literature. He was awarded the Padma Shri, India's fourth highest civilian honour, in 2023 in the field of literature and education.

== Background ==
Rattan Singh Jaggi was born on 27 July 1927 in Pindigheb, District Campbellpur, British India (now in Punjab, Pakistan). Following the Partition of India, his family relocated to India. He pursued higher education, earning Master of Arts degrees in Punjabi (1955) and Hindi (1957). He later obtained a PhD in 1962 from Panjab University (Chandigarh) with a thesis on the Puranic compositions in the Dasam Granth. In 1973, he was awarded a D.Litt. degree by Magadh University, Bodh Gaya, for his research on Guru Nanak.

== Career ==
Jaggi began his academic career as a lecturer in a government college in 1957. In 1963, he joined Punjabi University, Patiala, where he taught in the Department of Punjabi. He eventually became Professor and Head of the Department of Punjabi Literary Studies and served as the Chief Editor of the university's literary magazine, 'Khoj Patrika'. He retired from Punjabi University in 1987. After his retirement, he remained associated with the university and continued his scholarly work.

He authored over 140 books on various aspects of Punjabi, Hindi, and Gurmat literature. His work is particularly noted for its depth in medieval literature and the Bhakti Movement.

== Death ==
Jaggi died after a brief illness in Chandigarh on 22 May 2025 at the age of 97.

== Selected works ==
Jaggi's notable contributions to literature include multi-volume encyclopedias and detailed commentaries on major religious texts.

=== Encyclopedias ===
- Dictionary of Literary terms (Punjabi: Sahit Kosh)
- Dictionary of allusions used in Punjabi Literature (Punjabi: Punjabi Sahit Sandarbh Kosh)
- Guru Granth Encyclopedia (Hindi: Guru Granth Vishvkosh)
- Encyclopaedia of Sikhism (Punjabi: Sikh Panth Vishvkosh), published in two volumes initially and later expanded to four volumes.

=== Translations ===
Jaggi also provided comprehensive commentaries and translations of important religious and literary works:

- Translation of Tulsi Ramayan into Punjabi.
- Multi-volume commentary on the Dasam Granth in Punjabi and Hindi.
- Several multi-volume commentaries on the Guru Granth Sahib, including Arth Bodh Shri Guru Granth Sahib and Bhav Parbodhni Teeka Shri Guru Granth Sahib. He also completed transliteration and translation/commentary of the Guru Granth Sahib in Hindi.

His research on Guru Nanak's Bani led to publications such as Guru Nanak: Jeevni atey Vyaktitatva and Guru Nanak di Vichar dhara, both of which received awards. During the 550th Prakash Purb celebrations of Guru Nanak Dev, the Punjab Government commissioned and distributed his volume titled Guru Nanak Bani: Paathatey Vyakhya in Punjabi and Hindi.

== Awards and recognition ==
- Sahitya Akademi Award (1989), for his translation of Tulsi Ramayan into Punjabi.
- 'Punjabi Sahit Shiromani' (now known as 'Punjabi Sahit Rattan') (1996), the highest state award conferred by the Punjab Government
- Honorary D.Litt. degrees from Punjabi University, Patiala (2014), and Guru Nanak Dev University, Amritsar (2015)
- Padma Shri (2023)
- Gyan Ratna Award (2023)

Jaggi also won numerous other awards from Punjab and Haryana state governments for his books.
