= Meri Jeevan Yatra =

1944 autobiography by Rahul Sankrityayan

- मेरी जीवन यात्रा
- Author: Rahul Sankrityayan
- Original title: Meri Jeevan Yatra - My Journey Through Life
- Language: Hindi (Translated in many Languages)
- Series: 6 Volumes (I, II, III, IV, V, VI)
- Genre: Autobiography
- Publication date: 1944
- Publication place: Allahabad, India

Meri Jeevan Yatra (मेरी जीवन यात्रा), also known as My Journey Through Life, is an autobiography of scholar, and polyglot Rahul Sankrityayan. Sankrityayan was fluent in many languages and dialects, including Hindi, Sanskrit, Pali, Bhojpuri, Magahi, Urdu, Persian, Arabic, Tamil, Kannada, Tibetan, Sinhalese, French and Russian. He was an Indologist, a Marxist theoretician, and a creative writer. Meri Jeevan Yatra was first published in 1944. The book describes his life, including his childhood, his life journey, and his professional experiences.

== Volumes ==
The book was published in 6 different Volumes.

Volume	Language	Year	Place
I	Hindi	1944	Allahabad
II	Hindi	1950	
III	Hindi	Published Posthumously	
IV	Hindi	Published Posthumously	
V	Hindi	Published Posthumously	
VI	Hindi	Published Posthumously	

== See also ==
- Hindi literature
