= Inderjeet Kesar =

Indian Dogri writer

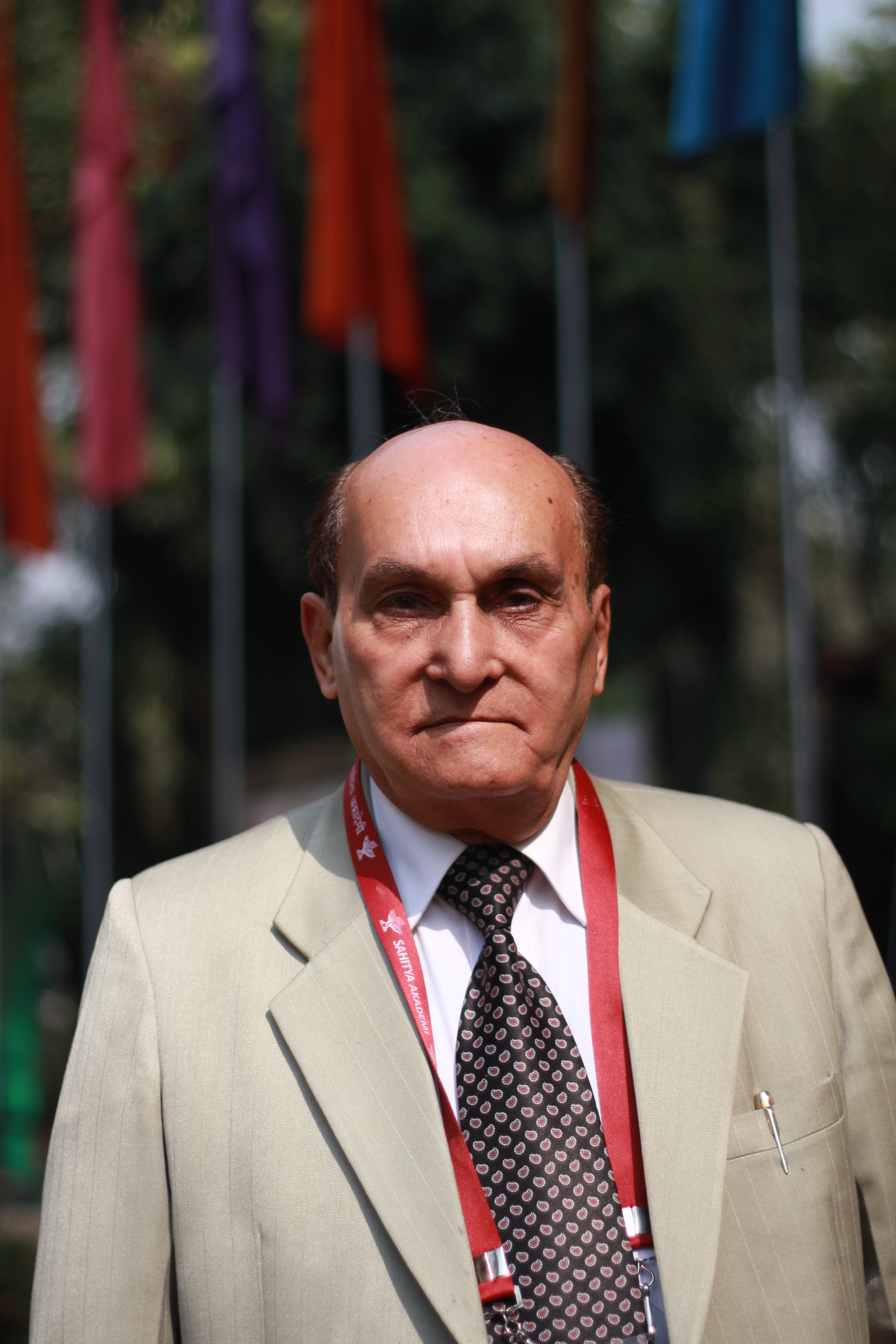
- Born: October 9, 1946; Katra, Reasi district, Jammu and Kashmir, India
- Occupation: Writer
- Writing career
- Language: Dogri
- Genres: Novel, poetry, short story, essay
- Notable work: Bhagirath
- Notable awards: Sahitya Akademi Award (2018)

Inderjeet Kesar (born 9 October 1946) is a Dogri-language Indian writer. He received Sahitya Akademi Award in 2018 for his Dogri novel Bhagirath.

== Early life and education ==
Kesar was born on 9 October 1946 in Katra in Reasi district of Jammu and Kashmir, India.

== Awards ==
- Sahitya Akademi Award in 2018 for Bhagirath.

He has also received the Shri Bandhu Sharma Smriti Puraskar.

== See also ==
- Sahitya Akademi Award
- Dogri literature
- List of Sahitya Akademi Award winners for Dogri
