= Pandaha =

- Village
- Interactive map of Pandaha
- Country: India
- State: Uttar Pradesh
- District: Azamgarh

Languages
  - Official: Hindi
- Time zone: UTC+5:30 (IST)
- Vehicle registration: UP-50
- Website: up.gov.in

Pandaha is a village in Rani Ki Sarai town of Azamgarh district in the state of Uttar Pradesh, India. It is the birthplace of historian Mahapandit Rahul Sankrityayan.

== Famous persons ==
- Mahapandit Rahul Sankrityayan - Indian linguist, polymath, historian, and nationalist
