= Mahapandit Rahul Sankrityayan Award =

Mahapandit Rahul Sankrityayan Award महापंडित राहुल सांकृत्यायन पुरस्कार
- Award for contributions to Travel Literature (2 Individuals); Instituted in 1989
- Awarded for: Literary award in India
- Sponsored by: Kendriya Hindi Sansthan, Government of India
- First award: 1993
- Final award: 2014

Highlights
- Total awarded: 30
- First winner: Dr. Kamala Sankrityayan; Dr. Shyam Singh Rashi
- Last winner: Dr. Puran Chandra Joshi; Hariram Meena
- Website: www.hindisansthan.org/hi/awards/mahapandit_awards.html

Mahapandit Rahul Sankrityayan Award (Devnagari: महापंडित राहुल सांकृत्यायन पुरस्कार) is a literary honor in India which Kendriya Hindi Sansthan, (Central Hindi Organization), Ministry of Human Resource Development, annually confers on writers of outstanding works in Hindi travel literature (यात्रा वृतांत). It is also called Hindi Sevi Samman or Rahul Sankrityayan National Award and is given to number of Hindi experts for playing their important role in promoting the Hindi language.

== History ==
The award was established by Kendriya Hindi Sansthan in 1989 on the name of the Rahul Sankrityayan, considered to be father of Hindi travel literature. It was first awarded in 1993 to Dr. Kamala Sankrityayan & Dr. Shyam Singh Rashi.

Mahapandit Rahul Sankrityayan Award is awarded for the development travelogue & research and analytical works in Hindi every year by the President of India.

== Recipients ==
Year	Name	Presenter
1993	(Late) Dr. Kamala Sankrityayan	
1993	Dr. Shyam Singh Rashi	
1994	Shankar Dalal Singh	
1994	Vishwanath Iyer	
1995	Vishnu Prabhakar	
1995	Dr. Rajendra Awasthi	
1996	Dr. Prabha Khaitan	
1996	Dr. Chandrakant Mahadev Bandiwadekar	
1997	Dr. Rameshwar Dayal Dubey	
1997	Katil Ganapati Sharma	
1998	Dr. Rajmal Bora	
1998	(Late) Dr. Nagendranath Upadhyay	
1999	(Late) Dr. Shashiprabha Shastri	
1999	Dr. Seetesh Alok	
2000	(Late) Shailesh Matiyani	
2000	Dr. V. Govind Shenay	
2001	Dr. Kamal Kishore Goenka	
2001	Dr. Viveki Rai	
2002	Dr. Ramdaras Mishra	
2002	Dr. S Takanmadi Amma	
2003	Krishnanath Mishra	
2003	Dinneshwar Prasad	
2004	Amritlal Veghad	
2004	Virendra Kumar Baranwal	
2005	Bhagwan Singh	
2005	Dr. Ramesh Chandrashah	
2006	Dr. Sadhana Saxena	
2006	Dr. Shekhar Pathak	
2007	Dr. Puran Chandra Joshi	Pratibha Patil
2007	Hariram Meena	Pratibha Patil
2010	Dr. Parmanand Panchaal	Pranab Mukherjee
2010	Raghuveer Chaudhari	Pranab Mukherjee
2011	Asghar Wajahat	Pranab Mukherjee
2011	Ved Rahi	Pranab Mukherjee
2014	Dr. Parmanand Panchal	Pranab Mukherjee
