= Om Sharma Jandriari =

Indian Dogri writer

- Died: 12 December 2019
- Occupation: Writer, essayist
- Language: Dogri
- Genre: Essays
- Notable works: Bandralta Darpan
- Notable awards: Sahitya Akademi Award (2019, posthumous)

Om Sharma Jandriari was an Indian Dogri-language writer. He received the Sahitya Akademi Award in 2019 (posthumously) for his work Bandralta Darpan.

== See also ==
- Dogri literature
- Sahitya Akademi Award
- List of Sahitya Akademi Award winners for Dogri
