= Viveki Rai =

Indian writer (1924-2016)

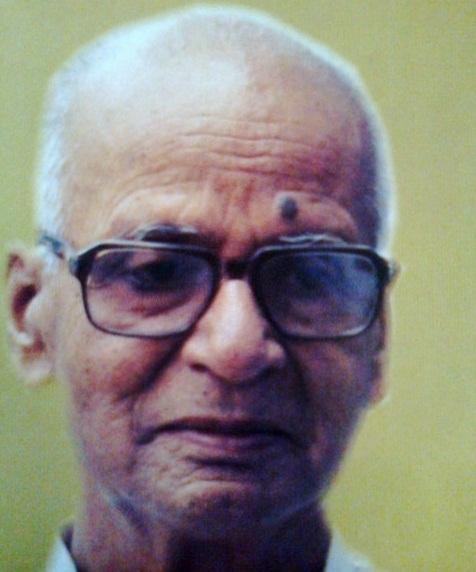
- Viveki Rai
- Born: 19 November 1924; Ghazipur, United Provinces, British India
- Died: 22 November 2016 (aged 92); Varanasi, Uttar Pradesh, India
- Occupation: Writer

Viveki Rai (19 November 1924 – 22 November 2016) was an Indian writer who penned over fifty books.

He was a famous literary figure of Hindi and Bhojpuri literature. He belonged to Bhumihar community of Sonwani village in Ghazipur. He was a well known Hindi Lalit Nibandhakaar. He received numerous awards from the government of Uttar Pradesh. Sonamati is his most popular novel. He was awarded Mahapandit Rahul Sankrityayan Award in 2001 and Uttar Pradesh's prestigious Yash Bharati Samman award in 2006 for his contribution to Hindi literature. He has been awarded the Mahatma Gandhi Samman by the Uttar Pradesh government. Sri Rai has been awarded by Jagadguru Ramanandacharya Award of Srimath Kashi on 14 January 2012 in Varanasi. He criticized the Indian Emergency through his writing. He also published some notable essays. After a long illness, Rai died on 22 November 2016.

== Early life ==
Viveki Rai was born in Bharauli village of Ghazipur district in Uttar Pradesh, India. He lost his father when he was a young child. He got his early education at his maternal place. His first employment was as a teacher at his village Sonwani. However, after a couple of years he moved to Sri Sarvodaya Inter College, Khardiha and started teaching Hindi. It was village Khardiha where he got recognition as a writer. After a few years at Khardiha he was employed at post graduate college Ghazipur as lecturer.

== List of works ==
=== Hindi ===
- Mangal Bhavan
- Namami Gramama
- Dehri ke
- Circus
- Sona Mati
- Kalatit
- Gunga Jahaj
- Purush Puran
- Samar Shesh Hai
- Fir Baitalawa Dar Par
- Aam Rasta Nahin Hai
- Angan Ke Bandanvar
- Astha Aur Chintan
- Atithi
- Babool
- Chali Fagunhat Baure Aam
- Gamvai Gandh Gulab
- Jivan Agyan Ka Ganith Hai
- Lautkar Dekhna
- Lokrin
- Manbodh Master Ki Diary
- Mere Shuddha Shraddhey
- Meri Terah Kahaniyan
- Narendra Kohli Apratim Katha Yatri
- Sawalon Ke Samne
- Shwet Patra
- Yeh Jo Hai Gayatri

==== Literary Criticism ====
- Kalpana Aur Hindi Sahitya, Anila Prakāśana, 1999.

==== Others ====
- MERI SHRESHTHA VYANGYA RACHNAYEN, 1984.

=== Bhojpuri ===
==== Essays and Poetry ====
- Bhojapurī nibandha nikuñja: Bhojapurī ke taintālīsa go cunala nibandha, Akhila Bhāratīya Bhojapurī Sāhitya Sammelana, 1977.
- Gaṅgā, Yamunā, Sarasvatī: Bhojapurī kahānī, nibandha, saṃsmaraṇa, Bhojapurī Saṃsthāna, 1992.
- Janatā ke pokharā: tīni go Bhojapurī kavitā, Bhojapurī Sāhitya Saṃsthāna, 1984.
- Bhojapurī Akādamī, Paṭanā, tisarakā vārshikotsava samāroha, Ravivāra, 2 Maī 1982, ke avasara para āyojita vyākhyānamālā meṃ Bhojapurī kathā sāhitya ke vikāsa vishaya para Ḍô. Vivekī Rāya ... ke vyākhyāna, Bhojapurī Akādamī, 1982.

=== Stories ===
- Chhat ke talas

==== Novels ====
- Amangalhari, Bhojpurī Saṃsthāna, 1998.
- Ke Kahala Chunarī Rangā la, Bhojpuri Saṃsāda, 1968.
- Guru-Grih Gayau Padhan Raghurai, 1992.

=== Ph.D. Dissertations on Viveki Rai ===
- Viveki Rai Ke Upanyasom Mein Anchalikata-By.Rajeemole C R Mahatma Gandhi University
- Gaav Ke Badalate Swaroop:Viveki Rai Ke Upanyason Ke Visesh Sandarbh Me-By. Daissy Peter, Sree Sankaracharya University of Sanskrit
- Dr Viveki Rai Vyaktitav Aur Krititav-By D K Bamane, University of Mumbai

== See also ==
- List of Indian writers
- Tapan Kumar Pradhan
- Namdeo Dhasal
