= Shiv Mehta =

Indian Dogri writer

- Born: Jammu and Kashmir, India
- Occupation: Writer
- Writing career
- Language: Dogri
- Genre: Short stories
- Notable awards: Sahitya Akademi Award

Shiv Mehta is an Indian writer. He is a recipient of the Sahitya Akademi Award.

== Awards ==
- Sahitya Akademi Award for Banna in 2017.

== Public actions ==
Mehta donated the prize money of his Sahitya Akademi Award to the family of a lynching victim.

== See also ==
- Sahitya Akademi Award
- Dogri literature
- List of Sahitya Akademi Award winners for Dogri
