= Naiki Duniya =

1942 Bhojpuri Play by Rahul Sanskritayan

Naiki Duniya (Transl.: The New World) is a Bhojpuri play written by Rahul Sankrityayan in 1942. It was written during the time of world war when Rahul Sankrityayan was in Hazaribagh jail. The play has four acts and promotes the idea of Communism. In this play, a communist society is imagined where every one is equal and there is not any distinction of rich and poor and everyone worships labours. The village is fully developed with all the required facilities.

== Characters ==
- Batuk : The main character
- Sona : Batuk's wife
- Ramdhani : Batuk's father
- Jagrani : Batuk's Grandmother
- Ramdeo Singh: An old man
- Ramesar Tiwari : An old Brahmin
- Khusari : Sarpanch
- Other Characters: Sukarulla, Visnudeo Parsad, Sugiya, Batuliya, Mahdei
