= Veena Gupta =

Dogri writer and translator

- वीणा गुप्ता
- Occupations: Writer, Translator
- Writing career
- Language: Dogri
- Notable awards: Sahitya Akademi Award (2022)

Veena Gupta is a Dogri language Indian writer and translator. She was awarded the Sahitya Akademi Award in 2022 for her work Chee Roopak. She also received Sahitya Akademi Translation Prize in 2013 for Kalkatte Di Kahani: Via Bypass.

== Awards and recognition ==
- Sahitya Akademi Translation Prize in 2013 for Kalkatte Di Kahani: Via Bypass.
- Sahitya Akademi Award in 2022 for Chee Roopak.
- Souharda Samman award.

== See also ==
- Sahitya Akademi Award
- Dogri literature
- List of Sahitya Akademi Award winners for Dogri
- List of Sahitya Akademi Translation Prize winners for Dogri
