= Sonwani =

- Village
- Location in Uttar Pradesh, India Sonwani (India)
- Coordinates: 25.682991°N 83.946522°E
- Country: India
- State: Uttar Pradesh
- District: Ghazipur
- Tehsil: Mohammadabad

Government
  - Type: Panchayati raj (India)
  - Body: Gram panchayat

Languages
  - Official: Hindi
  - Other spoken: Bhojpuri
- Time zone: UTC+5:30 (IST)
- Pin code: 233228
- Telephone code: 05493
- Vehicle registration: UP-61
- Website: up.gov.in

Sonwani is a village located in Mohammadabad tehsil of Ghazipur district, Uttar Pradesh. It has total 303 families residing. Sonwani has population of 2168 as per Population Census 2011.

== Administration ==
Sonwani village is administrated by Pradhan who is elected representative of village as per constitution of India and Panchyati Raaj Act.

Particulars	Total	Male	Female
Total No. of Houses	309		
Population	2168	1099	1069

== Notable people ==
- Viveki Rai, Eminent Hindi writer
- Kavindra Nath Rai - sportsperson commonly known as "bhismpitamah'" of varansi basketball
