= Chandan Negi =

- Born: 26 June 1937; Peshawar, North-West Frontier Province, British India (now in Pakistan)
- Died: 6 November 2025 (aged 88)
- Occupations: Writer; translator; radio presenter; social worker
- Spouse: J. S. Negi
- Writing career
- Language: Punjabi; Dogri; Hindko
- Notable works: Dogri–Punjabi Dictionary; Tere Laee
- Notable awards: Sahitya Akademi Translation Prize (2024)

Chandan Negi (26 June 1937 – 6 November 2025) was an Indian writer, translator, radio presenter, and social worker. She contributed to Punjabi and Dogri literature. She authored novels, short stories, and reference works, in addition to translating literary works from Hindi, Urdu, Dogri, and English into Punjabi. She was awarded the Sahitya Akademi Translation Prize 2024 for her Punjabi translation of the Hindi novel Tere Liye.

== Early life ==
Chandan Negi was born on 26 June 1937 in Peshawar, North-West Frontier Province, British India (present-day Khyber Pakhtunkhwa, Pakistan). During the Partition of India in 1947, her family migrated to Jammu, where she was raised and educated. Her native mother tongue was Hindko, which noticeably influenced the vocabulary and idiom of her subsequent literary output in Punjabi.

She later married J. S. Negi and relocated to Delhi.

== Career ==
In 1970, Negi joined All India Radio (AIR) in Jammu as a presenter for Punjabi-language programming. Having witnessed the impact of the Indo-Pakistani War of 1965 in the border region, she played an active role on air during the Indo-Pakistani War of 1971, presenting broadcasts aimed at countering Pakistani propaganda. Alongside her media and literary work, she was engaged in social work across Jammu and Kashmir.

Negi's creative writing focused primarily on real-life characters and contemporary social events. Her Punjabi novel Jalbin Kumbh became the subject of extensive academic scholarship, with research dissertations and MPhil theses conducted on it at institutions such as the University of Jammu, Punjabi University in Patiala, and Guru Nanak Dev University in Amritsar.

As a translator, Negi translated numerous literary texts into Punjabi from Hindi, Urdu, Dogri, and English. Her Punjabi translation of Himanshu Joshi's Hindi novel Tere Liye, titled Tere Laee, was selected by the Sahitya Akademi for the 2024 Translation Award in Punjabi.

Her compiled work, the Dogri–Punjabi Dictionary, was released posthumously in May 2026 at a function organized by the Punjabi Lekhak Sabha and the Jammu and Kashmir Academy of Art, Culture and Languages at K.L. Saigal Hall in Jammu, presented by Himachal Pradesh Governor Kavinder Gupta.

== Selected works ==
=== Novels ===
- Jalbin Kumbh (Punjabi)

=== Dictionaries ===
- Dogri–Punjabi Dictionary (published posthumously, 2026)

=== Translations ===
- Tere Laee (Punjabi translation of Himanshu Joshi's Hindi novel Tere Liye)

== Awards and recognition ==
- Sahitya Akademi Translation Prize (2024) for Tere Laee.
