= Vijay Verma =

Indian Dogri poet and Sahitya Akademi Award laureate

- Born: 13 April 1962 (age 64); Seri Panditan, Jammu district, Jammu and Kashmir, India
- Occupations: Poet, writer, translator, broadcaster
- Writing career
- Language: Dogri, Hindi, English
- Notable work: Daun Sadiyan Ek Seer
- Notable awards: Sahitya Akademi Award (2023)

Vijay Verma (born 13 April 1962) is a Dogri language Indian poet from Jammu and Kashmir. He received Sahitya Akademi Award in 2023 for his poetry collection Daun Sadiyan Ek Seer.

== Early life and education ==
Vijay Verma was born on 13 April 1962 in Seri Panditan village in Jammu district of Jammu and Kashmir, India.

== Awards ==
- Sahitya Akademi Award in 2023 for poetry collection Daun Sadiyan Ek Seer.

== See also ==
- Sahitya Akademi Award
- Dogri literature
