= Kamala Sankrityayan =

Indian writer

- कमला सांकृत्यायन
- Dr. Kamala Sankrityayan (1930–2009)
- Born: Kamala Pariyar; 15 August 1930; Kalimpong, West Bengal, India
- Died: 25 October 2009 (aged 79); Darjeeling, West Bengal, India
- Occupations: Writer; editor; scholar
- Parents: Chandraman Pariyar (father); Chandramaya Pariyar (mother)

Kamala Sankrityayan (née Pariyar; 15 August 1930 – 25 October 2009) was a 20th century Indian writer, editor and scholar of Hindi and Nepali literature. She was the wife of the renowned historian Rahul Sankrityayan.

== Biography ==
Kamala Sankrityayan was born on 15 August 1930 in Kalimpong in West Bengal to father Chandraman Pariyar and mother Chandramaya Pariyar in a Nepali Damai family. She passed her matriculation-level education in 1947. She was awarded a doctorate from Agra University, and was married to historian Rahul Sankrityayan. They had one son, Jeta, and a daughter Jaya.

== Career ==
Sankrityayan was a well known writer, scholar and translator. She translated Valmiki's Ramayana in Nepali. She also remained a member of The National Bibliography of Indian Literature (1901–1953). She also wrote books like The Ramayana Tradition in Asia, Mahamanav Mahapandit, Prabha, Nepali Sahitya, Rahul Sankrityayan, and others. She was well versed in many languages.

She actively participated in the field of Nepali and Hindi literature since the 1950s and the recipient of numerous Regional and National awards in Hindi and Nepali Literature. She was honoured with Bhanu Puraskar in 1982 and Mahapandit Rahul Sankrityayan Award in 1993, for her creation and compile of essays Bichar Tatha Biwechana. She has contributed 13 different Hindi and Nepali books and more than 500 piece of writing on her credits, equally responsible for the creation of Indian Literature Encyclopedia. She was also the head of Hindi Dept., Loreto College, Darjeeling. Her last book Dibya Mani was published in 2008.

== Books ==
- The Ramayana Tradition in Asia
- Mahamanav Mahapandit – 1995
- Prabha – 1994
- Nepali Sahitya – 1986
- Assam Ki Lokkathayen – 1981–1993
- Dibya Mani – 2008
- Bichar Tatha Biwechana
