= Phoolpur =

- Village
- Village location on Varanasi district map Phoolpur (Uttar Pradesh) Phoolpur (India)
- Coordinates: 25.520000°N 82.820000°E
- Country: India
- State: Uttar Pradesh
- Elevation: 83 m (272 ft)

Population (2011)
  - Total: 6,688

Languages
  - Official: Hindi
- Time zone: UTC+5:30 (IST)
- Postal code: 221206
- Telephone code: +91-5450
- Vehicle registration: UP65 XXXX
- Village code: 208579
- Website: up.gov.in

Phoolpur is a village in Pindra Tehsil of Varanasi district in the Indian state of Uttar Pradesh. It is about 33 kilometers north of Varanasi city, 283 kilometers south-east of state capital Lucknow and 791 kilometers south-east of the national capital Delhi.

== Demography ==
Phoolpur has a total population of 6,688 people amongst 959 families. The female-to-male ratio of Phoolpur is 953 overall and 872 in children. The Uttar Pradesh state averages are 912 and 902, respectively^{[note]}.

Details	Male	Female	Total	Comments
Number of houses	-	-	959	(census 2011)
Adult	2,892	2,800	5,692	(census 2011)
Children (0–6 years)	532	464	996	(census 2011)
Total population	3,424	3,264	6,688	(census 2011)
Literacy	90.49%	67.11%	78.99%	(census 2011)

== Transportation ==
Phoolpur can be accessed by road and by Indian Railways. Its closest railway station is Khalispur (2.5 kilometers east) and the nearest operational airports are Varanasi airport (16.5 kilometers south) and Allahabad Airports (128 kilometers west).

== Notes ==
- All demographic data is based on 2011 Census of India.
