= Vishnu Prabhakar =

Indian writer

- Vishnu Prabhakar
- Born: 21 June 1912; Miranpur, United Provinces of Agra and Oudh, British India
- Died: 11 April 2009 (aged 96); New Delhi, India
- Occupations: Novelist, writer, journalist
- Writing career
- Genres: fiction, novels, non-fiction, essays
- Notable works: Ardhanarishwar, Aawara Masiha

Vishnu Prabhakar (21 June 1912 – 11 April 2009) was a Hindi writer. He had several short stories, novels, plays and travelogues to his credit. Prabhakar's works have elements of patriotism, nationalism and messages of social upliftment. He was the First Sahitya Academy Award winner from Haryana.

He was awarded the Sahitya Akademi Award in 1993, Mahapandit Rahul Sankrityayan Award in 1995 and the Padma Bhushan (the third highest civilian honour of India) by the Government of India in 2004.

== Life and career ==
Along with his work he pursued an interest in literature. He also joined a Natak company in Hissar. His literary life started with the publication of his first story Diwali in the Hindi Milap in 1931. He wrote Hatya Ke Baad, his first play in 1939. Eventually he began writing as a full-time career. He stayed with the family of his maternal uncle until the age of twenty seven. He married Sushila Prabhakar in 1938 who stayed as an inspiration source for his literature until her death in 1980.

After Indian Independence he worked as a drama director, from September 1955 to March 1957, in Akashvani, All India Radio, New Delhi. He made news when in 2005 he threatened to return his Padma Bhushan award after he allegedly had to face misconduct at Rashtrapati Bhavan.

Vishnu Prabhakar died at the age of 96, on 11 April 2009 after a brief illness in New Delhi. He was suffering from a heart problem and infection of the urinary tract. His wife, Sushila Prabhakar, had died in 1980. Prabhakar is survived by two sons and two daughters. His sons Atul Prabhakar and Amit Prabhakar decided to donate his body to the All India Institute of Medical Sciences, New Delhi as their father's last wishes.

=== How he became 'Prabhakar' ===
He became 'Vishnu Prabhakar' from 'Vishnu'; his name was listed as 'Vishnu Dayal' in the primary school of Mirapur. In the Arya Samaj school, on being asked the 'Varna', he answered – 'Vaishya'. The teacher put down his name as 'Vishnu Gupta'. When he joined government service, the officers changed his name to 'Vishnu Dharmadutt' because there were many 'Guptas' in the office and it confused the officers. He continued writing by the pen name of 'Vishnu'. When an editor once asked him, "Why do you use such a short name? Have you passed any examination?" Vishnu answered that he had passed 'Prabhakar' examination in Hindi. Thus the editor appended Prabhakar to his name making it 'Vishnu Prabhakar'.

== Bibliography ==
=== Novels ===
1. Dhalti Raat, 1951
2. Nishikant, 1955
3. Tat Ke Bandhan,
1. Darpan Ka Vyakti, 1968
2. Parchhai, 1968
3. Koi To, 1980
4. Ardhnarishwar, 1992

=== Story Collections ===
1. Ek Kahani Ka Janam (एक कहानी का जन्म) (Collection of his Love Stories), 2008
2. Aadi Aur Ant, 1945
3. Rehman Ka Beta, 1947
4. Zindagi Ke Thapede, 1952
5. Sangharsh Ke Baad, 1953
6. Dharti Ab Bhi Ghoom Rahi Hai, 1959
7. Safar Ke Saathi, 1960
8. Khandit Pooja, 1960
9. Sanche Aur Kala, 1962
10. Meri Tentis Kahaniya, 1967
11. Meri Priya Kahaniya, 1970
12. Pul Tootne Se Pehle, 1977,
13. Mera Watan (मेरा वतन), 1980,
14. Meri Lokpriya Kahaniya, 1981
15. Meri Badrinath Yatra
16. Khilone, 1981
17. Aapki Kripa (Short Stories), 1982
18. Meri Kahaniya, 1984
19. Meri Kathayatra, 1984
20. Ek Aur Kunti, 1985
21. Zindagi Ek Rehearsal, 1986

=== Poetry ===
1. Chalta Chala Jaonga, 2009

=== Plays ===
1. Naprabhat, 1951
2. Samaadhi (Gaandhar Ki Bhikshuni), 1952
3. Doctor, 1961
4. Yuge-Yuge Kranti, 1969
5. Toot-te Parivesh, 1974
6. Kuhaasa Aur Kiran, 1975
7. Tagar, 1977
8. Bandini(बंदिनी), 1979
9. Satta Ke Aar-Paar, 1981
10. Ab Aur Nahin, 1981
11. Shwet Kamal, 1984
12. Keral Ka Krantikari, 1987
13. Vishnu Prabhkar : Sampurna Natak (Part-1,2,3), 1987
14. Pustak Kit
15. Seema rekha
16. Sanskar aur Bhavna

=== Biographies – Memories ===
1. Jaane Anjaane, 1961
2. Kuchh Shabd : Kuchh Rekhaayen, 1965
3. Aawara Masiha, 1974
4. Amar Shahid Bhagat Singh, 1976
5. Sardar Vallabhbhai Patel, 1976
6. Swami Dayananda Saraswati, 1978
7. Yadaun Ki Teerthyatra, 1981
8. Shuchi Smita, 1982
9. Mere Agraj : Mere Meet, 1983
10. Samantar Rekhaayen, 1984
11. Hum Inke Rini Hain, 1984
12. Mere Humsafar, 1985
13. Rah Chalte-Chalte, 1985
14. Kaka Kalelkar, 1985

=== Essays ===
1. Jan-Samaj Aur Sanskriti : Ek Samgra Drishti, 1981
2. Kya Khoya Kya Paya, 1982

=== Children's Literature ===
1. Imandar Balak
2. Mote Lal, 1955
3. Kunti Ke Bete, 1958
4. Ramu Ki Holi, 1959
5. Dada Ki Kachehari, 1959
6. Sharachandra, 1959
7. Jab Didi Bhoot Bani, 1960
8. Jeevan Parag, 1963
9. Bankimchandra, 1968
10. Abhinav Ekanki, 1968
11. Abhinay Ekanki, 1969
12. Swaraj Ki Kahani, 1971
13. Hadtaal, 1972
14. Jaadu Ki Gaay, 1972
15. Ghamand Ka Phal, 1973
16. Nutan Baal Ekanki, 1975
17. Heere Ki Pehchaan, 1976
18. Motiyon Ki Kheti, 1976
19. Paap Ka Ghada, 1976
20. Gudiya Kho Gayi, 1977
21. Aise-Aise, 1978
22. Tapovan Ki Kahaniyan
23. Pahad Chade Gajanand Lal, 1981
24. Balvarsha Zindabad, 1981
25. Khoya Hua Ratan (खोया हुआ रत्न), 2008
26. Pustak Keet

=== Miscellaneous ===
1. Baapu Ki Batein, 1954
2. Hajrat Umar 1955
3. Meri badrinath ki yatra, 1955
4. Kasturba Gandhi, 1955
5. Aise Thai Sardar, 1957
6. Ha-Du-Al Rashid, 1957
7. Hamare Padosi, 1957
8. Man Ke Jeete Jeet, 1957
9. Murabbi, 1957
10. Kumhar Ki Beti, 1957
11. Baajiprabhu Deshpande, 1957
12. Shankracharya, 1959
13. Yamuna Ki Kahani, 1960
14. Ravindranath Thakur, 1961
15. Pehla Sukh : Nirogi Kaya, 1963
16. Main Achhoot Hoon, 1968
17. Ek Desh : Ek Hridaya, 1973
18. Manav Adhikar
19. Nagarikta Ki Aur
20. Theka

=== Others ===
- Plays: Prakash aur Parchhaiyan, Barah Ekanki, Ashok
- संस्मरण: हमसफ़र मिलते रहे

== Awards and honours ==
1. Sahitya Akademi Award, 1993
2. Mahapandit Rahul Sankrityayan Award, 1995
3. Padma Bhushan, 2004
4. Soviet land nehru award, 1976 for awara masiha

Both Sahitya Akademi and Padma Bhushan awards were given for his novel Ardhanarishvara (The Androgynous God or Shiva).

== Sources ==
- Sandhya Singh (Editor) 2004. Sanvaad Part 2, NCERT, New Delhi
