= Birendra Kumar Bhuyan =

Indian writer (1933–1991)

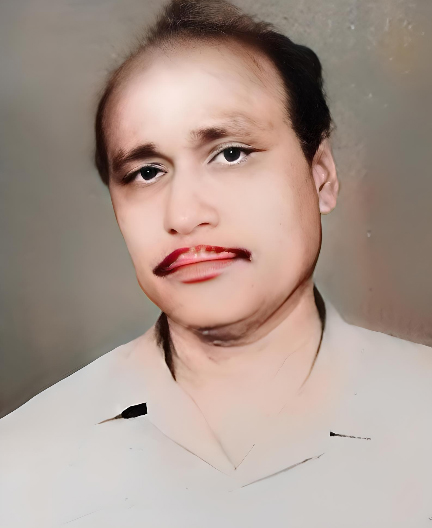
- Birendra Kumar Bhuyan
- Born: 25 July 1933; Nilapada, Odisha
- Died: 19 June 1991 (aged 57); Netaji Nagar, Cuttack, Odisha, India
- Occupations: Writer, poet, lyricist
- Spouse: Shubhashini Bhuyan
- Relatives: Sushila Devi (Aunt) Freedom Fighter
- Writing career
- Language: Odia

Birendra Kumar Bhuyan (25 July 1933 – 19 June 1991) was an Indian writer, poet and lyricist in the Odia literature. Birendra has contributed to Odia literature by writing several national award-winning books and songs in Odisha.

== Early life and career ==
Birendra Kumar Bhuyan was born on 25-July-1933 to Balaram Bhuyan and Sulochana Devi in Nilapada, a small village on the bank of the Birupa, a tributary of the river of Mahanadi in that time Jajpur a sub-division in the district of Cuttack.

He started writing from 1951. His main area of focus was children's literature. He had written many Odia songs out of which in 1965 "Eka K eKa", "Joutuka Deiparibini", Jataka Padichhi Raja Jataka","Kalasha Upare Amba Dalia Gori Kanyaku Bara Kalia"which were sung by many famous singers of Odisha like Akshaya Mohanty, Bhikari Bal, and Mohammed Sikander Alam.Many of his compositions had already been broadcast from Akashvani Cuttack.

He was also a lyricist in All India Radio, Cuttack..His book "Lakhmi Nandan" for neo literates was awarded with the 27th National Award by Human Resource Development Department of Government of India. For his contributions towards Odia Children Literature, he was awarded Mina Bazar Award by Prajatantra Prachar Samiti founded by Dr.Harekrushna Mahatab.

His first posting was in Talcher where he worked in Adult Education department of Govt. of India. He couldn't complete his service and died just before his retirement from service on 19-June-1991 at the age of 57 years.

== Family ==
He was married to Shubhashini Bhuyan in 1956. He has two sons, Subhendra and Satyendra and three daughters, Jayasri, Gitisri and Padmasri. His Aunt Sushila Devi popularly known as Singha Jhia Sushila (Daughter of Leo) was a freedom fighter during the Indian independence movement and was a follower of Mahatma Gandhi.

== Bibliography ==
- Kete Je Pakhi
- Kete Je Fula
- Bagala Baguli
- Kunmuni
- Lakhmi Nandan
- Hati O Maduka Katha
- Gadia Ganga
- Dhanya Se Jhhia
- Kete Jati Fala
- Bana Raijara Katha
- Bhabana ra swara, an anthology of various forms of Poems is published after his death.
