= Miranpur, Uttar Pradesh =

Miranpur
- Town
- Location in Uttar Pradesh, India Miranpur (India)
- Coordinates: 29°17′25″N 77°56′50″E
- Country: India
- State: Uttar Pradesh
- District: Muzaffarnagar
- Elevation: 230 m (750 ft)

Languages
  - Official: Hindi
- Time zone: UTC+5:30 (IST)
- PIN: 251315
- Telephone code: 01396
- Vehicle registration: UP-12
- Website: up.gov.in

Miranpur is a town and a nagar panchayat in Muzaffarnagar district in the Indian state of Uttar Pradesh.

== Demographics ==
As of 2001 India census, Miranpur had a population of 26,101. Males constitute 53% of the population and females 47%. Miranpur has an average literacy rate of 53%, lower than the national average of 59.5%: male literacy is 61%, and female literacy is 45%. In Miranpur, 19% of the population is under 6 years of age.

== People from Miranpur ==
- Vishnu Prabhakar (21 June 1912 – 11 April 2009), Hindi writer
- A. M. Turaz, Indian poet, lyricist, and script writers
