= Virendra =

Virendra is a given name. Notable people with the name include:

- Birendra Sutradhar (1937–1961), Bengali language activist who was martyred on 19 May 1961
- Virendra Mohan Dar (1758-1821), was an Indian King, Jagirdar and founder of Dar royal family.
- Virendra Bhatia, politician and Member of the Parliament of India
- Virendra Kumar (born 1954), member of the 14th Lok Sabha of India
- Virendra Kumar Baranwal (born 1941), Hindi language writer and poet
- Virendra Kumar Sakhlecha, chief minister of the Indian state of Madhya Pradesh
- Virendra Saxena, Indian theater, film and television actor
- Virendra Sharma (born 1947), British Labour Party politician and Member of Parliament for Ealing Southall
- Virendra Swarup, Member and Chairman of Legislative Council of Uttar Pradesh, India and an educationist
