= Kunwar Viyogi =

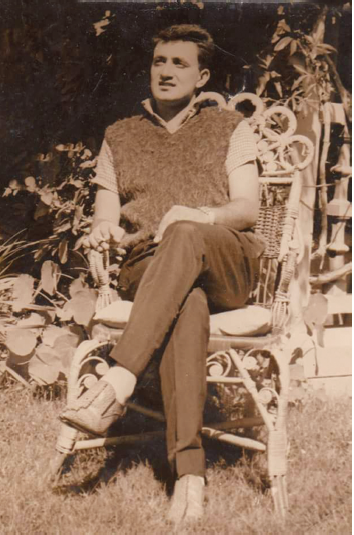
- Born: 4 September 1940; Samba, Jammu and Kashmir India
- Died: 2015 (aged 75)
- Occupation: Poet
- Spouse(s): Prem Rajput (1965–1988; her death); Sudha Chaturvedi (1989)
- Children: Poonam (daughter); Rashmi (daughter); Shallu (daughter)
- Writing career
- Notable works: "Ghar" a long poem, Pehliyaan Banga a sonnet sequence of 200 sonnets
- Notable awards: Sahitya Akademi (1980)

Kunwar Viyogi (4 September 1940 – 2015), born Randhir Singh Jamwal, was a poet, and the only Indian Air Force officer to have received the Sahitya Akademi Award, which was awarded in 1980 for his long Dogri language poem "Ghar." He used "Ghar" [Home] as a peg and strung together 238 four-lines verses embracing a wide variety of subjects and ideas and feelings into a long poem. He is also the youngest poet in the history of Sahitya Akademi to have received this honour. Viyogi is noted for introducing the sonnet, a relatively new and unexplored genre for Dogri writers, into Dogri literature.

== Early life ==
Kunwar Viyogi was born on 4 September 1940 in the Samba district to Poorakh Singh Jamwal, who served as an inspector in the Jammu and Kashmir Police department. His mother, Pushpa Devi, was a homemaker, and mother to five brothers and three sisters, of which Kunwar was the eldest. Most of Viyogi's siblings served the country by either joining the army or the air force. All his sisters were married to defence officers.

Viyogi's childhood was not tied to one place owing to his father's occupation. He grew up in Gaur Bajorian, Rajouri, Buddal, Kotli (presently in Pakistan), Jammu and Udhampur. He spent a major part of his life in Jammu's Fattu Chogan area and was inspired by poetry at the age of 13. He achieved acclaim for his work published in the magazines Khilona and Shamaa, contributing short stories.

== Academic life ==
Viyogi received his primary education from primary schools in Gaur, Sarore and Pacca Danga. His middle level education was from the princely school Partap Memorial Rajput School in Jammu. He later joined the G.G.M. Science College for higher studies. His interest in studies led him to pursue BSc, PGDM (Post Graduate Diploma of Management), PGDMC (Post Graduate Diploma of Mass Communication), MBA (Master of Business Administration) and post graduation in journalism. Kunwar Viyogi was proficient in Dogri, Urdu, Hindi, English and Punjabi. His hobbies included playing football and hockey and he actively participated in the events of the student union.

== Profession ==
While pursuing his graduation, Viyogi applied for the Defense Forces—Army, Navy, and the Air Force—and was selected for all three. He opted for the Air Force and joined the Air Force Flying College for training as a pilot. The nature of his job took him across India and he served as a squadron leader in New York for about one and a half years. Though Viyogi excelled as an Air Force officer, he took premature retirement due to the demise of his wife who lost her life to breast cancer. He withdrew from the life that he had known with her, moved to Bhilwara, Rajasthan, and gave up all his literary musings. He then devoted his time in training students pursuing IAS and MBA. He wrote editorials, essays and poems. He again retreated to Rajasthan. In 2001, Viyogi was conferred the Sahitya Ratan Award by the Nami Dogri Sanstha for his invaluable contribution to Dogri. From 2012-15, he worked to publish and reprint his work.

== Major works ==
Dogri-Ghar – a long poem, 1979 in Rubaiyat

Viyogi wrote "Ghar" [Home] in 1980. He used ghar as a peg and strung together 238 four lines verse embracing a wide variety of subjects and ideas and feelings into a long poem.

Dogri-Pehliyaan Banga – A sonnet sequence of 200 sonnets, 1987

Viyogi created his original masterpiece, Pehliyaan Banga, a book of 200 Dogri sonnets at a time when this form of poetry was unheard of in Dogri and was considered specific to European literature.

A stream that attempted to introduce new and uninhibited form of literature, Pehliyaan Banga was the poet's attempt to rid the language of its claustrophobic garb.

English—Vol. 1-- Rosary of Sonnets (collections of 365 sonnets)

The year 2018 saw publication of Viyogi's work in English, Rosary of Sonnets, a two-volume anthology of more than 300 sonnets. He writes of wringing life's worth living out of the dismal bounties he was bestowed.

English- River Sage- A sonnet sequence

River Sage is a curated anthology of select 45 sonnets.

== Other works ==
- English Vol. 2 -- Rosary of Sonnets (collections of 365 sonnets)
- English Vol. 3 ---Now I Know---(1 Poems & 2 Gazalen)
- English Vol. 5 ---BANJARAN (1. Features & 2. Book review )

== Unpublished work ==
- English Vol. 4 -- The Ante Room (1 Stories & 2 RandomThoughts)
- Dogri Vol. 6-7 -- Poems--- Poorne (collection of ~491 poems)
- Dogri Vol. 11-14-- Sonnets- Sanneten De mala (A collection of 650 sonnets+200)
- Dogri Vol. 15 -- Rubaian- Sabak (Collection of ~755 rubaian)
- Dogri Vol. 16----Rubaian-- Ghar-A Alna
- Dogri Vol. 17 --- Geet—TOSHI (collection of ~125 Geet)
- Dogri Vol. 18 -- Sher- Chutkian, Urdu
- Dogri Vol. 19 ---- Stories-
- Dogri Vol. 20 --- Novels
- Dogri Vol. 21 --- Patte Di Gall

== Awards and recognition ==
- Sahitya Akademi Award for his long poem "Ghar" in 1980
- Sahitya Ratan Award by the Nami Dogri Sanstha in 2001
- A Gold Medal for best fighter controller in 1966.
- Commendation of Chief of Air Force in 1985.
- History in Indian music was created in 2017, when Jammu's largest literary organisation, Dogri Sanstha, adapted Viyogi's sonnets into soulful compositions and presented them at the first ever sonnet concert in any Indian language, Sonnet Sandhya.

== Kunwar Viyogi Memorial Trust ==
The Kunwar Viyogi Memorial Trust was established in commemoration of Viyogi. Education, literary, art innovation, technological advancements in language and literature and entertainment are the key areas through which the Trust has been working towards the revival, preservation and promotion of Dogri language.

To encourage youth to embrace the Dogri language, Kunwar Viyogi Memorial Trust awards scholarships, literary awards, art innovation awards at university, college and school level for the young and talented.

The Trust has also introduced innovation in entertainment, whereby Dogri couplets, sonnets, verses, ghazals etc. written by renowned Dogri writers are being converted into modern-day Dogri music to attract youth towards the language.
