= Chaman Arora =

Dogri writer and Sahitya Akademi Award recipient

Chaman Arora was an Dogri literature Indian writer. He was posthumously awarded the Sahitya Akademi Award for his short story collection Ik Hor Ashwthama in 2024.

== Early life and career ==
Arora was born on 19 February 1945 in Jammu. Arora served in the Agriculture Department and retired in 2003 as a District Agriculture Officer. Chaman Arora was a prominent Dogri writer associated with literary activities in Jammu and Kashmir.

== Awards and recognition ==
- Sahitya Akademi Award in 2024 for Ik Hor Ashwthama.

== See also ==
- Sahitya Akademi Award
- Dogri language
