= Virendra Kumar Baranwal =

Hindi Poet

- Born: 21 August 1941 (age 85); Phoolpur, Azamgarh, Uttar Pradesh
- Died: 12-06-2020
- Education: Banaras Hindu University
- Occupations: Poet, writer
- Writing career
- Notable awards: Mahapandit Rahul Sankrityayan Award

Virendra Kumar Baranwal (born 1941) is an Indian poet and writer. He was awarded by Mahapandit Rahul Sankrityayan Award in 2004 for his work Jinna: Ek Punardrishti.

== Personal life ==
Baranwal was born on 21 September 1941 to Dayaram Baranwal and his wife Gayatri Devi in the village of Phoolpur in Azamgarh district in Uttar Pradesh. His father was a Freedom fighter. He acquired B.A., M.A. degrees from Banaras Hindu University. Further he did his LL.B. degree from Bhopal University.

Baranwal retired from the post of Chief Commissioner of Income Tax in the Indian Revenue Service from 1969 to 2005, teaching English language and literature for a few years. Baranwal has a keen interest in Hindi, Urdu, English, Sanskrit and comparative literature as well as on literary literature, black and red Indian literature, and the discourse of Indian renaissance and freedom struggle.

== Published work ==
Barnwal has published many works, but Jinna: Ek Punardrishti is his most well known.

- Paani Ke Chhite Suraj ke Chehre
- Vole Shoyinka ki Kavitayen
- Pahal
- Rakt mein Yatra
- Tanav
- Machi Tawara ki Kavitayen
- Jinna : Ek Punardrishti
- Woh Pahla Nakhuda Hindustani ke Safine
- Hind Swaraj : Nav Sabhyata Vimars
- Ratanbai Jinna
- Muslim Navjagaran aur Akbar Ilahbaadia ka Gandhinama

== Awards ==
- Mahapandit Rahul Sankrityayan Award - 2004
