= Ardhanarishwar (novel) =

Novel by Vishnu Prabhakar

- Cover of the book
- Author: Vishnu Prabhakar
- Original title: अर्धनारीश्वर
- Language: Hindi
- Subject: Romance
- Genre: Novel
- Publisher: Sahitya Akademi Publications
- Publication date: 1992
- Publication place: India
- Pages: Approx 1200
- Awards: Sahitya Akademi Award (1993); Padma Bhushan (2004); Sahitya Akademi Translation Prize (2002, Punjabi translation); Sahitya Akademi Translation Prize (2013, Rajasthani translation)
- ISBN: 8189859501

Ardhanarishwar (meaning The Androgynous God or Shiva) is a Hindi novel by Indian writer Vishnu Prabhakar, published in 1992. It won the 1993 Sahitya Akademi Award for Hindi, given by Sahitya Akademi, India's National Academy of Letters. Prabhakar was honoured with the Padma Bhushan, the third-highest civilian award in the Republic of India, in 2004 for it. It is about 1200-pages long and was well received by the readers.

== Reception ==
Dr. Subhash Rastogi writing for Hindi daily Dainik Tribune, says, "In Ardhanarishwar, Vishnu grapples with the most burning issue of rape today. The author has investigated many fundamental reasons for this problem from a psychological perspective. This novel is also different from the traditional structure of Hindi novels. The author has divided 'Ardhanarishvara' into three sections - individual-mind, society-mind and inner-mind."

=== Awards and recognition ===
- The book won the 1993 Sahitya Akademi Award from Sahitya Akademi, India's National Academy of Letters in 1993.
- Its writer Vishnu Prabhakar won the Padma Bhushan in 2004 for his novel Ardhanarishwar.
- In 2002, Ardhanarishwar (Punjabi translation) by Gulwant Farigh won the Sahitya Akademi Translation Prize, given by Sahitya Akademi.
- In 2013, Ardhanarishwar (Rajasthani translation) won the Sahitya Akademi Translation Prize, by Sahitya Akademi. The award was given to Shanti Bhardwaj Rakesh, the translator.

== In popular culture ==
Koi to Ho Ardhnarishwar, a Doordarshan's Hindi daily TV soap was the adoption of the novel, Ardhanarishwar. It was originally aired in 2010 on Doordarshan.
