= Deen Bandhu Sharma =

Deen Bandhu Sharma (30 October 1934 – 11 November 2000) was an Indian writer from the State of Jammu and Kashmir. Bandhu Sharma is best known for writing the award-winning book, Meel Patthar (Milestone). It is a collection of short stories that won him the prestigious Sahitya Akademi Award, the second highest literary award in India.

== Early life and education ==
Deen Bandhu Sharma or Bandhu, as he was fondly known amongst his family and friends, was born in October 1934 in the princely state of Jammu and Kashmir. His father, Pandit Jagdish Datt Sharma was the royal priest and the consultant to the king of Jammu & Kashmir, Hari Singh. Mother Krishna Sharma was very spiritual and unlike the women in that era, she held an in-depth knowledge of religion and Religious books. Bandhu was a very inclined towards academics and literature from a very young age and completed his degree of ‘Prabhakar’ and Bachelor of Arts in English. He had extensively read about Karl Marx and Lenin and developed a strong believe in Marxism from a very young age. He also greatly admired Shakespeare and had read all the work by the great playwright.

== Singing and writing career ==
Bandhu’s father was inclined towards classical music and it is believed that well known classical singers would come over to his place and play with him and Bandhu would listen to them for hours. It is no surprise therefore, that he had a deep understanding and interest in classical music and grew up to be a very polished and respected vocalist. For many years, he was associated with Jammu and Kashmir radio station for singing shows and radio plays. However, after the birth of his first daughter, Archana he quit singing on air as it was not considered to be a respected profession in those days. This was the turning point in his life, and around 1964-1965, he started writing short stories in his mother tongue ‘Dogri’. His first story "Baba Jitto" was much appreciated among writers, readers and media.

== Awards ==
Bandhu Sharma was recipient of many awards. His book 'Meel Pathhar' (English: 'Milestone') won him the prestigious Sahitya Akademi Award for Dogri language in the year 2000. Akademi Award is the second highest literary award of India. Bandhu Sharma was also the winner of Jammu and Kashmir Award for writing in 1975.

== Works ==
Kingre (Dogri Short Stories) 1983

Sur Dharti De (A Collection of Dogri Essays) 1993

Meel Pathhar ( A Collection of Dogri Short Stories)

Parshamen (A Collection of Dogri Short Stories)
