= Sitaram Sapolia =

Dogri poet and lyricist

- Born: November 22, 1938; Diyani, Samba district, Jammu and Kashmir, India
- Died: May 2022 (aged 83)
- Occupations: Poet, lyricist, educator
- Writing career
- Language: Dogri
- Genres: Poetry, songs, bhajans, short stories
- Notable work: Doha Satsai
- Notable awards: Sahitya Akademi Award (2013)

Sitaram Sapolia (22 November 1938 – May 2022) was an Indian Dogri poet and lyricist. He was a recipient of the Sahitya Akademi Award.

== Early life ==
Sapolia was born on 22 November 1938 in the village of Diyani in Samba district of Jammu and Kashmir, India.

== Career ==
Sapolia served as a senior lecturer in the Jammu and Kashmir Education Department. He wrote in multiple literary forms including poetry, short stories, doha, songs, and bhajans. He authored nine books during his literary career. His works were published in literary journals and broadcast on radio.

== Awards and honours ==
- Sahitya Akademi Award (2013) for Doha Satsai.

== Death ==
Sitaram Sapolia died in May 2022 at the age of 83 after a prolonged illness.
