= Volga Se Ganga =

Hindi historical fiction

- Author: Rahul Sankrityayan
- Original title: वोल्गा से गंगा
- Translator: Victor Kiernan
- Language: Hindi
- Subject: Indian history, Aryan migration, Buddhism, Indian independence movement
- Genre: Historical fiction
- Publisher: Kitab Mahal
- Publication date: 1943
- Publication place: India
- Media type: Print
- Pages: 382
- ISBN: 81-225-0087-0
- OCLC: 82212373
- LC Class: PK2098 S27 V6 1943

Volga Se Ganga (Hindi: वोल्गा से गंगा, English: From Volga to Ganga) is a 1943 collection of 20 historical fiction short-stories by scholar and travelogue writer Rahul Sankrityayan. The stories collectively trace the migration of Indo-Iranian peoples from the Eurasian steppes to regions around the Volga; and their subsequent spread to the Indo-Gangetic Plain of the Indian subcontinent, while covering the lives of individuals living through different periods in history. The book begins in 6000 BC and ends in 1942, the year when Mahatma Gandhi, started the Quit India Movement.

== Publication history and translations ==
Sanskritayan wrote his debut novel Jine Ke Liye in 1938. Meanwhile, in 1941-42 he was inspired by the historical stories of Bhagawat Sharan Upadhyay. Later, he wrote 20 short stories while imprisoned in Hazaribagh Central Jail for taking part in the struggle for Indian independence. These stories were first published in a collection in 1943. This book is now considered a classic in history of Indian literature.

It has been translated into many languages, including Nepali, Assamese, Marathi, Bengali, English, Kannada, Tamil, Malayalam, Telugu, Punjabi, where it ran into several editions, besides foreign languages, such as Russian, Czech, Polish, Chinese, and many more. The first Bengali translation was published in 1954.The first Tamil translation was published in 1949 by Kanna Muthaiyyah.

== Synopsis ==
Volga Se Ganga is about the history of Indo–European people who were later known as the Aryans. The 20 stories are woven over a span of 8000 years and a distance of about 10,000 km.

The first story, "Nisha", is about cavemen living in Caucasia (southern Russia) about 6000 BC. The society or its precursor at that time was matriarchal, and so the story is named after the leader of the family 'Nisha'. Here one can find a gradual transformation from a matriarchal society (the first two stories) to a patriarchal one (the rest), a gradual change from freedom to slavery, from acceptance of slavery to its loathing and the likes. If one is to believe Sankrityayan, then an apprehension for technological advancement is nothing new. People were wary of the new armament which was fast replacing the older stone equipment (fourth story – "Puruhoot" (Tajikistan 2500 BC)). The same story tells how an arms race was started during that period and how southerners amassed great wealth at the expense of the northerners.

The sixth story, "Angira" (Taxila 1800 BC), is about a man who wants to save the Aryan race from losing its identity to other races by teaching people about their true culture (precursor to Vedic Rishis). The eighth story Pravahan (700 BC. Panchala, U.P.) is about the upper class manipulating religion for their own vested interests and conspiring to keep people in the dark for at least 2000 years. The tenth story, Nagdatt, suggests that Indians, the Greeks, and people from the Middle-East mingled easily with each other in the times of Chanakya and Alexander. This story is about a philosopher classmate of Chanakya who travels to Persia and Greece and learns how Athens fell to Macedonia. The eleventh story (Prabha, 50 AD) is about the famous (also the first Indian) dramatist Aśvaghoṣa, who adopted the Greek art of drama into Indian culture in a very beautiful and authentic way, and his inspiration. Baba Noordeen (1300), the 15th story is about the rise of Sufism. The seventeenth story Rekha Bhagat (1800 is about the barbarous rule of the East India company and the anarchy it brought to parts of India. The last story ("Sumer", 1942) is about a man who goes on to fight the Japanese because he wants Soviet Russia to triumph, for this nation, according to him, is the only hope left for humanity.

== About the author ==
Rahul Sankrityayan was greatly influenced by Marxist ideas. This influence can be easily felt in the last three stories. Mangal Singh (the protagonist in the 18th story) personally knows Marx and Engels and is amazed how Marx knows so much about India. He explains to Anne, his beloved, how Science is indispensable to India but, unfortunately, the Indians put faith above it. He goes on to fight the British in the 1857 uprising with a strict code of conduct.

The author (original name Kedarnath Pandey) was so deeply influenced by Buddhism that he adopted it along with the name Rahul (The name of Gautam Buddha's son). This influence is also felt in his stories Bandhul Mall (490 BC, 9th story) and Prabha. Also the dynamical view of life which is at the centre of Buddhist philosophy can be seen. One more characteristic feature that deserves mention here is the simplicity of language.
