= Rahul Sankrityayan =

Indian scholar and author (1893–1963)

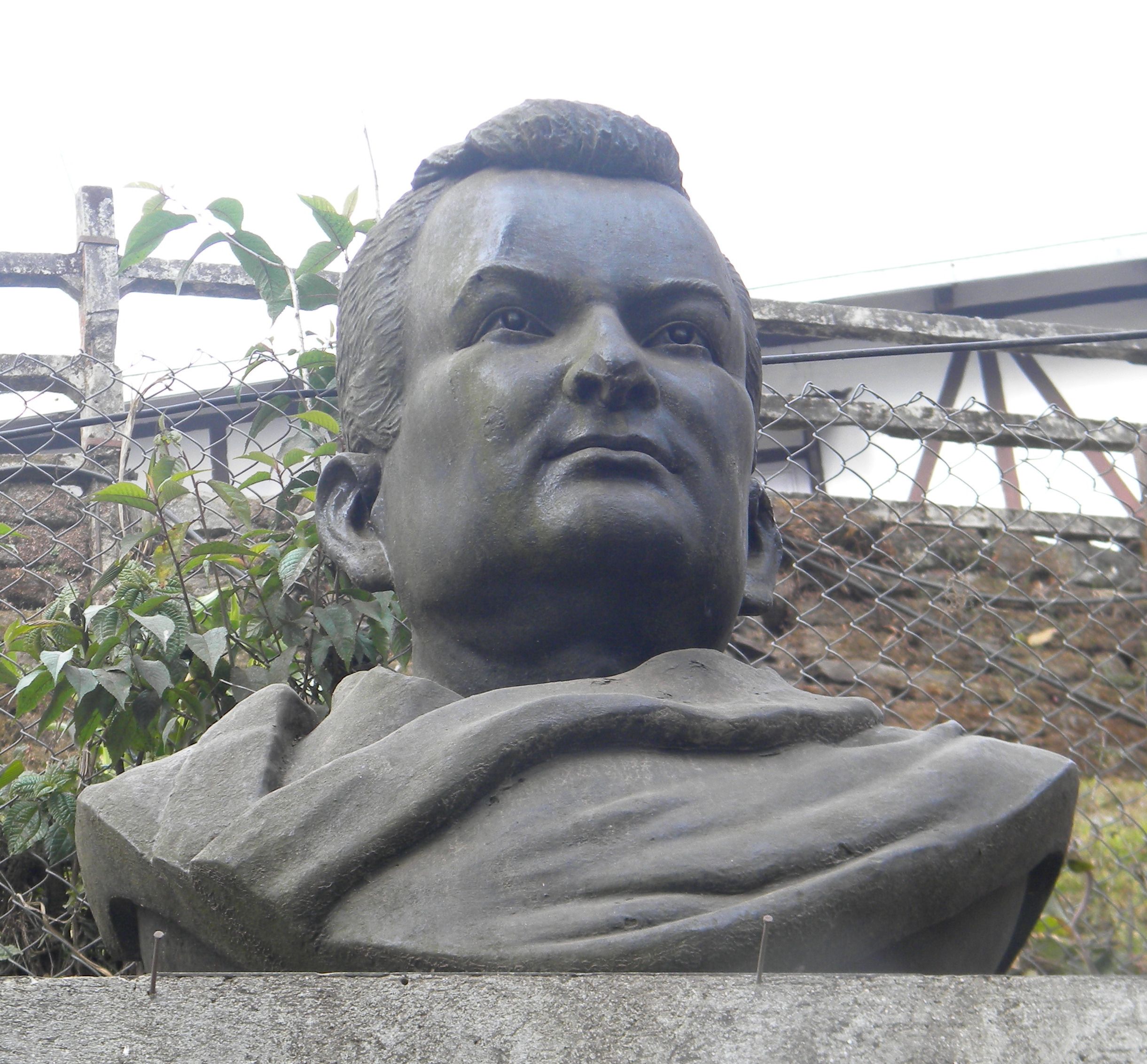
- Bust of Sankrityayan in Darjeeling
- Born: Kedarnath Pandey; 9 April 1893; Pandaha, Azamgarh district, North-Western Provinces, British India
- Died: 14 April 1963 (aged 70); Darjeeling, West Bengal, India
- Occupations: Writer; essayist; scholar
- Spouse(s): Santoshi, Ellena Narvertovna Kozerovskaya, Kamala Sankrityayan
- Writing career
- Subjects: Buddhism, Communism, History, Indology, philology, philosophy, Tibetology
- Notable works: Volga Se Ganga, Madhya Asia ka Itihas, Meri Jeevan Yatra, Ghumakkad Shastra
- Notable awards: 1958: Sahitya Akademi Award; 1963: Padma Bhushan

Rahul Sankrityayan (born Kedarnath Pandey; 9 April 1893 – 14 April 1963) was an Indian author, essayist, playwright, historian, and scholar of Buddhism who wrote in Hindi and Bhojpuri. Known as the "father of Hindi travel literature", Sankrityayan played a pivotal role in giving Hindi travelogue a literary form. He was one of the most widely travelled scholars of India, spending forty-five years away from his home, exploring regions such as Russia, Tibet, China, and Central Asia.

Knowing around 30 languages including English, Hindi, Bhojpuri, Tibetan, Sanskrit, Pali, Russian, Arabic, etc., Sankrityayan almost always wrote in Hindi. The honorific mahapandit ("Great scholar" in Hindi) has been applied before his name since his lifetime.

Sankrityayan wrote extensively, his collection of works spanning more than 100 books on various subjects like Indology, Communism, Buddhism, and philology as well as various short stories, novels and plays. He was awarded the 1958 Sahitya Akademi Award for his 2 volume "Madhya Asia ka Itihaas" (History of Central Asia). The Government of India awarded him the Padma Bhushan, the country's third-highest civilian award, in 1963. He died the same year, aged 70.

== Biography ==
=== Childhood ===
Rahul Sankrityayan was born as Kedarnath Pandey, the eldest child in a Saryuparin Brahmin family of Gotra Sankriti in the village of Pandaha in Azamgarh district on 9 April 1893. His ancestral village was Kanaila Chakrapanpur, Azamgarh district, in Eastern Uttar Pradesh. His mother tongue was Bhojpuri. His family traces back their roots to Malaon village on the banks of river Rapti in present day Gorakhpur district. For the previous seven generations his family had been landowners who earned their living as farmers. His early education was arranged by his maternal grandfather, Ramsharan Pathak who had him educated in the Urdu language as at the time, Urdu was seen as the language of the court and an essential language for one to know if they intended to work in any administrative job in British India. In 1899, he also briefly attended a Hindu school in Badauda where he learnt the Devanagari script. Around 1902, Sankrityayan began to study Sanskrit with his uncle, Mahadev Pandit, a well-known scholar of the language.

In 1909, after completing middle school, his grandfather intended for him to start receiving an English-medium education however Sankrityayan resisted this as he wished to be able to continue studying Sanskrit. He also termed English an "alien language".

=== Early travels ===
Sankrityayan's travel history began in 1910 when he set out for the Western Himalayas for pilgrimages. He travelled to Haridwar, Rishikesh, Badrinath and Kedarnath with the intention of studying Vedanta. His grandfather learned about his travels and tried to retrieve him but met with little success. Afterwards, Sankrityayan went to Varanasi and started his studies there in 1911. Due to his time spent travelling across India, Sankrityayan had no formal education or university degree and was largely self-taught on various topics. In 1912, he travelled to Chhapra in Bihar where he was initiated as a sadhu and given the new name, Ramudar Das. He was to become the heir of a mahant of an ashram belonging to the Vaishnava tradition. Eventually, he found himself becoming bored and fled Chapra later that same year for South India where he stayed at the Uttarārdhī monastery. After a few months, he again left and arrived in Ayodhya.

=== Arya Samaj ===
In October 1914, he returned to his home in Azamgarh with his family and it seemed that he had now abandoned his desire to become a sadhu. It was during this period that he was introduced to the Arya Samaj, a Hindu reform movement. Once again, in 1915, he left his home and travelled to the Ārya Musafir Vidyālaya in Agra where he was allowed to study free of cost and also trained to deliver lectures on the Arya Samaj movement. During this time, as well as studying about the Arya Samaj, he also engaged with the Arabic language as well as various other religions of the world. After two years in Agra, he later moved to Lahore which was a centre of the Arya Samaj movement, to study at the Dayanand Anglo Vedic school. From Lahore, he would frequently travel to spread Arya Samaj doctrine in other locations.

The teachings of the founder of the Arya Samaj, Dayananda Saraswati emphasised elements of social reform and these same teachings carried over to Sankrityayan. This also led to his first engagements with Buddhism as he would travel around to spread Arya Samaj ideals. Among some of the locations he would visit include Kushinagar, Sarnath, Lumbini and Bodh Gaya.

=== Political activities and conversion to Buddhism ===
The year 1921 marked the end of Sankrityayan's engagement with the Arya Samaj and the beginning of his activities as part of the Indian independence movement. On the 31st of January 1922, he was arrested while chairing a meeting of the District Congress Committee in Chhapra and sent to Buxar jail for six months. However, even after being released, he continued his political activities. He also began to campaign for the Mahabodhi Temple to be handed over to Buddhist control as part of his role in the Gaya Congress. He was later jailed for further incidents and by 1927 he had spent a total of 2 and half years in jail.

It was during this stay in Bihar that Sankrityayan turned from politics and the Arya Samaj to Buddhism. He took up a teaching position in Sanskrit at the Vidyālaṅkāra Pariveṇa in Sri Lanka in 1927 and he stayed there for a total of nineteen months where he immersed himself in the study of Buddhist texts and the Pali language. He eventually earned the title of Tripiṭakācārya which indicates that he had become a master of the Tripitaka which is an ancient collection of Buddhist texts. He left Sri Lanka for Tibet at the end of 1928. This was not an easy journey and he had to travel by land through the Kathmandu Valley to reach his destination. The journey took one year, six months, and twenty days in total before he finally reached the Tibetan city of Lhasa. In Tibet, he learned the local language while also collecting manuscripts. He also compiled an unpublished dictionary entitled the Bhot-Sanskrit śabdkoś which contained 16,000 words. He returned to Sri Lanka in 1930 where he was finally ordained as a monk and given the monastic name, Rahul Sankrityayan. The head monk of the monastery, Mahapad Nayak Mahastavir, initially did not allow Sankrityayan to leave so from the 7th of October to the 14th of December of 1930, he wrote a new book entitled the Buddha caryā. He was finally granted permission to leave on 15th December 1930 at which point he left for Chapra. He also visited other places including the historical sites in Sindh and Sarnath. He returned to the monastery in Sri Lanka on the 28th of November 1931.

In July of 1932, he and Bhadant Anand Kausalyayan visited London as representatives of the Maha Bodhi Society to act as religious messengers. Sanrkityayan returned after only a few months despite requests from the society to promote Buddhism in other European countries and the United States of America. The reason he gave for this is:

I find the capitalist life very dreary. I have observed and understood what I wanted to (in London); there are similar things in America; so I do not want to waste my time.

In 1933, Sankrityayan spent his time writing and also visiting new places in Patna, Ladakh and Lahore. Between 1934 and 1938, he also visited Tibet three times as well as Burma, Korea and Japan among others. He brought back more than eighty Sanskrit Buddhist works of which he translated and published many.

=== Russia and peasant movement activities ===
Sankrityayan first visited Russia in 1935 where he spent a fortnight. He had hoped to visit the Russian Indologist, Fyodor Shcherbatskoy however the latter was based in Leningrad and Sankrityayan was not permitted to travel there. His next visit to Russia was in 1937 when he was invited by the Soviet Academy to teach Sanskrit at Leningrad University. During this time, he met Ellena Narvertovna Kozerovskaya and began to teach her Sanskrit. They soon developed a relationship and married on the 22nd of December 1937. Due to this marriage, he had to discard the robes of a Buddhist monk and instead became a lay Buddhist practitioner (Upāsaka). His son, Igor, was also born in 1938 in Russia. After returning from Russia in 1938, Sankrityayan rejoined the peasant movement and became a member of the Congress Socialist Party. He was also a founding member of the Bihar Communist Party. He was jailed for a few months for organising a Satyagraha at Amvari. In 1940, he presided over a peasant's meeting in Motihari and was rearrested for a provocative speech for which he spent two years in jail in Hazaribagh. During this period of imprisonment, he wrote several influential works including Volga Se Ganga, "Viśva kī rūprekhā" (Outline of the World), and "Vaijñānik bhautikvād" (Scientific Materialism), among others.

After his eventual release, in his third stay in Russia from 1945 to 1947, Sankrityayan was invited to take up a professorship at Leningrad University. His expertise in Buddhology was highly regarded, as noted by Professor Shcherbatskoy, who praised him as an authoritative figure in the subject. During this period, Sankrityayan made numerous audio recordings of texts in Sanskrit and Prakrit. His family joined him in Leningrad, and he later documented his experiences in Russia in his work, "Rūs mẽ paccīs mās" (Twenty-five Months in Russia), published in 1951. Following India's independence in 1947, Sankrityayan returned to India a few days later on 17 August 1947.

=== Final years ===
Sankrityayan's house in Darjeeling where he spent his final days

After India's independence in August 1947, Sankrityayan returned to India, leaving Russia, despite his deep ties and contributions there. Although he could not stay in Russia permanently due to visa issues and his family couldn't settle in India, his experiences there solidified his commitment to communism and Indian nationalism. Back in India, he remained active in literature and politics, becoming president of the All India Hindi Literary Conference. His strong advocacy for Hindi and opposition to Urdu as the national language led to his dismissal from the Communist Party.

Late in life, he married Kamala Sankrityayan, who was an Indian writer, editor and scholar in Hindi and Nepali. They had a daughter Jaya Sankrityayan Parhawk, one son, Jeta. Jeta is a professor of Economics at North Bengal University.

Sankrityayan’s health declined over time, especially with the onset of diabetes. Nonetheless, he continued his literary work, dictating several works, including the award-winning History of Central Asia. In 1959, he moved briefly to Sri Lanka to lead a philosophy department but returned due to poor health. In December 1961, he suffered memory loss and was taken to Russia for treatment without improvement. On 14 April 1963, he died in Darjeeling.

== Philosophy ==
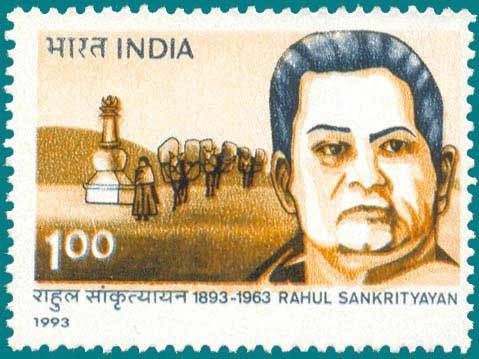
Stamp of India released in 1993 to celebrate Rahul Sankrityayan's birth anniversary

Various ideals influenced the personal philosophy of Rahul Sankrityayan including the critical examination of religion, and the advocacy of social justice. Sankrityayan approached Buddhism primarily as a cultural and intellectual heritage rather than as a religion. He regarded the Buddha not merely as a religious figure but as a profound thinker and a symbol of India’s philosophical achievements. To him, Buddhism epitomized India’s contribution to global civilization and was a source of national pride. Sankrityayan emphasised Buddhist values such as compassion, atheism, and economic equality, which he believed offered a robust foundation for humanistic ideals.

Central to his philosophy was the integration of Buddhism with Indian cultural nationalism. He sought to revive India’s historical and cultural prominence by reconnecting with its Buddhist legacy. This commitment was evident in his extensive efforts to retrieve lost Buddhist manuscripts from Tibet and his advocacy for the restoration of ancient centers of learning, such as Nalanda. For Sankrityayan, Buddhism symbolized the intellectual and moral grandeur that India once represented on the world stage. Despite his admiration for Buddhism, Sankrityayan maintained a critical stance toward organized religion, which he viewed as an impediment to societal progress. His embrace of Buddhism was deeply rooted in its philosophical and cultural dimensions rather than in religious orthodoxy. This critical perspective extended to his exploration of other ideologies, including the Arya Samaj and later communism, each of which he engaged with before moving toward Marxism.

In Marxism, Sankrityayan found a practical philosophy that complemented the ethical and philosophical principles of Buddhism. He identified shared ideals in their critique of dogmatism and their advocacy for equality and societal transformation. Sankrityayan argued that Marxism offered the tools necessary to implement the changes envisioned in Buddhist thought, particularly in the realms of economic and social reform. Rahul Sankrityayan’s intellectual life was marked by transitions, reflecting his quest for philosophical frameworks that aligned with his evolving worldview. From his early association with the Arya Samaj to his later commitments to Buddhism and communism, Sankrityayan consistently sought ideas that could address India’s cultural and socio-political challenges.

== Books ==
Sankrityayan understood several languages, including Bhojpuri (his mother tongue), Hindi, Sanskrit, Pali, Magahi, Urdu, Persian, Arabic, Tamil, Kannada, Tibetan, Sinhalese, French and Russian. He was also an Indologist, a Marxist theoretician, and a creative writer. He started writing during his twenties and his works, totaling well over 100, covered a variety of subjects, including sociology, history, philosophy, Buddhism, Tibetology, lexicography, grammar, textual editing, folklore, science, drama, and politics. Many of these were unpublished. He translated Majjhima Nikaya from Prakrit into Hindi.

Rahul's Tombstone at Darjeeling. This tombstone is established at a place called "Murda Haati" which is a cremation ground downtown in the lower altitudes of Darjeeling around 25 minutes drive from the ChowRasta. The same place also has the tombstone of Sister Nivedita

One of his Hindi books is Volga Se Ganga (A journey from the Volga to the Ganges) – a work of historical fiction concerning the migration of Aryans from the steppes of the Eurasia to regions around the Volga river; then their movements across the Hindukush and the Himalayas and the sub-Himalayan regions; and their spread to the Indo-Gangetic Plain of the subcontinent of India. The book begins in 6000 BC and ends in 1942, the year when Mahatma Gandhi, the Indian nationalist leader called for the Quit India movement. It was published in 1942. A translation into English of this work by Victor Kiernan was published in 1947 as From Volga to Ganga.

His travelogue literature includes:

- Tibbat Me Sava Varsha (1933)
- Meri Europe Yatra (1935)
- Athato Ghumakkad Jigyasa
- Volga Se Ganga
- Asia ke Durgam Bhukhando Mein
- Yatra Ke Panne
- Kinnar Desh Mein

== Works ==
=== In Hindi ===
Novels

- Baaeesween Sadi – 1923
- Jeeney ke Liye – 1940
- Simha Senapathi – 1944
- Jai Yaudheya – 1944
- Bhago Nahin, Duniya ko Badlo – 1944
- Madhur Swapna – 1949
- Rajasthani Ranivas – 1953
- Vismrit Yatri – 1954
- Divodas – 1960
- Vismriti Ke Garbh Me

Short Stories

- Satmi ke Bachche – 1935
- Volga Se Ganga – 1944
- Bahurangi Madhupuri – 1953
- Kanaila ki Katha – 1955–56

Autobiography

- Meri Jivan Yatra I – 1944
- Meri Jivan Yatra II – 1950
- Meri Jivan Yatra III, IV, V – published posthumously

Biography

- Sardar Prithvi Singh – 1955
- Naye Bharat ke Naye Neta (2 volumes) – 1942
- Bachpan ki Smritiyan – 1953
- Ateet se Vartaman (Vol. I) – 1953
- Stalin – 1954
- Lenin – 1954
- Karl Marx – 1954
- Mao-Tse-Tung – 1954
- Ghumakkar Swami – 1956
- Mere Asahayog ke Sathi – 1956
- Jinka Main Kritajna – 1956
- Vir Chandrasingh Garhwali – 1956
- Mahamanav Budha – 1956
- Akbar – 1956
- Simhala Ghumakkar Jaivardhan – 1960
- Kaptan Lal – 1961
- Simhal ke Vir Purush – 1961

Some of his other books are:-

- Mansik Gulami
- Rhigvedic Arya
- Ghumakkar Shastra
- Kinnar desh mein
- Darshan Digdarshan
- Dakkhini Hindi ka Vyaakaran
- Puratatv Nibandhawali
- Manava Samaj
- Madhya Asia ka Itihas
- Samyavad hi Kyon

=== In Bhojpuri ===
Plays

- Japaniya Rachhachh
- Des Rachchhak
- Jarmanwā ke hār nihichay
- ī hamār laṛāi
- Dhunmum Netā
- Naiki Duniya
- Jonk
- Mehrarun ke Durdasa

=== Related to Tibetan ===
- Tibbati Bal-Siksha – 1933
- Pathavali (Vol. 1, 2 & 3) – 1933
- Tibbati Vyakaran (Tibetan Grammar) – 1933
- Tibbat May Budh Dharm-1948
- Lhasa ki or
- Himalaya Parichay Bhag 1
- Himalaya Parichay Bhag 2

== See also ==
- Hindi literature
- List of Indian writers
- Dharmananda Damodar Kosambi
- Bhadant Anand Kausalyayan
